= Charles Allen Lechmere =

Jack the Ripper suspect (1849–1920)

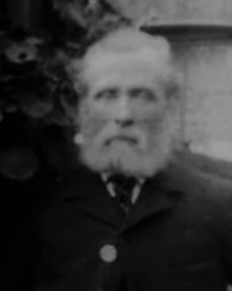
- Lechmere in 1912
- Born: 5 October 1849; Soho, London, England
- Died: 23 December 1920 (aged 71); Bow, London, England
- Other name: Charles Allen Cross
- Known for: Discovering the first canonical Jack the Ripper victim Jack the Ripper suspect
- Spouse: Elizabeth Bostock (m. 1870)
- Children: 11

Charles Allen Lechmere (5 October 1849 – 23 December 1920), also known as Charles Allen Cross, was an English delivery driver who became involved in the unsolved Whitechapel murders after he reportedly found the body of Mary Ann Nichols, the first of Jack the Ripper's five canonical victims. Due to the circumstances surrounding him finding her body, some theorists presume he was Jack the Ripper, feigning a story about finding her body to cover suspiscion about the events.

A native of East London, Lechmere has long been regarded as merely a witness at the crime scene, but since the 2000s, true crime writers have named Lechmere a potential Jack the Ripper suspect, largely due to his having provided authorities with an alias surname and alleged inconsistencies in his testimony.

== Biography ==
Charles Allen Lechmere was born on 5 October 1849, in Soho. He was the son of John Allen Lechmere and Maria Louisa Roulson. His father was a boot-maker who deserted the family, and moved to Northamptonshire when Charles was very young. He began a family there with another woman. Charles Lechmere's mother married policeman Thomas Cross in 1858, and the boy Charles was recorded as 'Cross' (the only occasion known) in the 1861 United Kingdom census.

Thomas Cross died in 1869, when his stepson was twenty. Charles Lechmere married Elizabeth Bostock on 3 July 1870, at Christ Church, in the parish of St George in the East. His mother married Joseph Forsdike on 29 July 1872, at Bethnal Green, and Charles Lechmere signed the register as a witness.

== Involvement in the Whitechapel murders ==
In Lechmere's testimony to the Nichols inquest, he said that he left for work at around 3:30 a.m. on 31 August 1888. While walking Buck's Row, he discovered the body of Mary Ann "Polly" Nichols lying next to a gateway. Lechmere found Nichols at about 3:40 a.m. According to his first press interview, Robert Paul, who was walking some distance behind, first noticed him standing "where the woman was"; in reports of his inquest testimony Paul said he saw him "in the middle of the road." When approached by Lechmere, Paul at first avoided him, thinking he was about to be attacked. After touching Paul on the shoulder, Lechmere brought him over to look at the woman. Because they were wary of being late for work, Lechmere and Paul left Buck's Row. They decided to notify the first policeman they came across of what they had seen. At about 3:45 a.m., at the corner of Hanbury Street and Baker's Row, both saw PC Mizen and told him what they had found. According to the testimony of Robert Paul, he saw Mizen no more than four minutes after Paul first saw the body of Nichols. No blood was described by either man, but at about 3:45 a.m., when a constable (PC Neil) found Nichols, blood was coming from the wound in her throat (according to the evidence at the inquest). Some theorists suggest that the cut to her throat was very fresh when Lechmere and Paul were present. (Note: PC Neil signalled with his lamp to alert PC Thain whom he saw nearby. Thain was told by Neil to go and fetch Dr Llewelleyn, at 152, Whitechapel Road, which was just 300 yards from Buck's Row. At about 3:55 a.m., Thain arrived at the surgery and then went with Llewelleyn immediately to Buck's Row. From an initial examination of the body then made at the scene, Llewelleyn estimated that Nichols had been dead for about thirty minutes.) Neither man reported seeing or hearing anyone else at Buck's Row.

== Jack the Ripper suspect ==
The suggestion that Lechmere might actually be the perpetrator of the Whitechapel murders was first raised by Derek Osborne in 2000 in an issue of the magazine Ripperana. The following year saw the possibility further explored in an article by John Carey, while Osborne went on to examine information which suggested that the man who gave his name as 'Cross' at the inquest was in fact a man legally known as Lechmere. Lechmere's possible guilt was further discussed by John Carey in 2002; by Osborne in 2007, by Michael Connor in four issues of The Ripperologist between 2006 and 2008. and by Bob Mills in The Ripperologist 2021.

Mainstream awareness of Lechmere grew in 2014 when journalist Christer Holmgren and criminologist Gareth Norris explored the case against him in the 2014 Channel Five documentary Jack the Ripper: The Missing Evidence. In 2021, Holmgren produced a book in which he accuses Lechmere of committing the Whitechapel Murders, as well as the series of killings known as the Thames Torso Murders.

The theory suggests that Lechmere may have murdered Nichols and begun mutilating her body when he suddenly heard the sound of Paul's footsteps; he then rapidly pulled down her clothing to cover up her wounds and portrayed himself as the discoverer of the body. However, both Lechmere and Paul testified that they were together and tried to pull down the clothing. As Paul and Lechmere were both late for work they continued to walk intending to notify the next PC they found. PC Mizen was reported as saying that Lechmere told him, "You are wanted in Buck's row by a policeman; a woman is lying there." (Note: At the inquest, Lechmere denied that he had said this to Mizen: "A Juryman: Did you tell Constable Mizen that another policeman wanted him in Buck's-row? The Witness: No; because I did not see a policeman in Buck's-row.") PC Neil was at the scene when PC Mizen arrived but Lechmere had no way of knowing that. Some newspapers reported that instead Lechmere had said to Mizen, "You're wanted down there (pointing to Buck's Row)." At the inquest, Lechmere gave his name as Charles Allen Cross, using the surname of his police constable stepfather; later investigators found that no-one named Cross was listed in the census records for the address he supplied, meaning that his true identity was a mystery for well over a century. He did give his address and place of employment to the inquest.

Holmgren argues that geographic profiling, developed decades after the Ripper murders, can help narrow down likely suspects by analyzing their established movements and habitual locations in comparison to crime scenes. Criminals tend to strike in areas that are not too close to home, yet with which they are somewhat familiar and comfortable. Given this data, Holmgren argues Lechmere is the most plausible suspect for the Ripper murders. Lechmere's logical shortest routes to work—one passing down Hanbury Street, the other down Old Montague Street—would have Lechmere pass nearby streets around the same times as Martha Tabram, Polly Nichols, and arguably Annie Chapman were murdered.

Mary Jane Kelly was murdered near the northernmost route to his work, and the time frame in which she is estimated to have been killed is reconcilable with his presumed journey, although the day she was killed was a holiday and he may have had the day off work.

== Later life ==
Charles Lechmere is recorded in the 1901 Census as a railway agent carman. He started his own business as a grocer in 1902. Lechmere died in December 1920 at the age of seventy-one of a cerebral haemorrhage, hardening of the arteries, and chronic bronchitis.
