= Edward Badham =

Edward Badham (12 July 1862 – 1949) was an English police sergeant involved in the investigation into the Jack the Ripper's murders, particularly those of Annie Chapman and Mary Jane Kelly.

He was born in Barnes, Surrey to Abraham Badham and Martha Badham. His father was a shoemaker. He retired in 1905.

== Police career ==
Badham joined the Metropolitan Police on 25 October 1880 - Warrant No 65001.

He initially served with 'N' Division (Stoke Newington) in Hackney at Mare Street Police Station, where he is listed in the 1881 Census as living in the Police Lodgings at the rear of the Station.

28/07/1886 Transferred to 'J' Division (Bethnal Green).

02/02/1888 Promoted to Police Sergeant and transferred to 'H' Division (Whitechapel) collar number 31H.

28/07/1893 Promoted to Station Police Sergeant and transferred to 'R' Division as a Detective (Blackheath Road).

30/10/1905 Pensioned as SPS with CID on 'R' Division and transferred to Reserve.

Throughout the Summer of 1912, Badham rejoined the Met Police as a reserve officer, and again in August 1914.

For some reason Badham did not rejoin the force for the Coronation of George V in 1911, when many retired officers were recalled for duty. However, the 1912 duties he did were as cover for labour demonstrations and civil unrest which were sweeping the nation at the time. This reached a peak around the summer of 1912 and required a substantial number of extra police in London to cope, with many officers rejoining to swell the ranks. The 1914 duty Badham did was for the build-up to the First World War.

== The Whitechapel murders (Jack the Ripper) ==
On promotion to Police Sergeant in 1888, Badham was transferred to 'H' Division at Whitechapel, an area he would have been familiar with due to his previous duties in Hackney and nearby Bethnal Green. Shortly after taking up his new position at Commercial Street Police Station he became involved in the investigations of three of Jack The Ripper's victims.

The London and national press quoted him several times, but for some reason they rarely got his name correct. He was reported on various occasions as Edmund, Baddam, Bedham, Betham, Baugham, as well as Sergeant Barry or Berry.

=== The Annie Chapman murder ===
Badham was first called to testify at the inquest of Annie Chapman on 13 September 1888, where he was questioned by Coroner Wynne Edwin Baxter about his involvement in the transporting of her body from Hanbury Street to the mortuary. His testimony was reported by the Times the next day:

Sergeant Edmund Barry, 31H, stated that on Saturday last he conveyed the body of the deceased from 29, Hanbury-street, to the Whitechapel mortuary on the police ambulance. Detective-Sergeant Thicke examined the body and gave out a description of it to witness. In doing this that sergeant moved the clothing about. Two females from 35, Dorset-street, were also present, and described the clothing to witness. They did not touch the clothing or the body. Inspector Chandler then came.

On the same day The Daily Telegraph offered some additional details:

Sergeant Baugham, 31 H, stated that he conveyed the body of the deceased to the mortuary on the ambulance. _[Coroner] Are you sure that you took every portion of the body away with you? - Yes. _[Coroner] Where did you deposit the body? - In the shed, still on the ambulance. I remained with it until Inspector Chandler arrived. Detective-Sergeant Thicke viewed the body, and I took down the description. There were present two women, who came to identify the body, and they described the clothing. They came from 35, Dorset-street. _[Coroner] Who touched the clothing? - Sergeant Thicke. I did not see the women touch the clothing nor the body. I did not see Sergeant Thicke touch the body.

Paul Begg in his book (Jack the Ripper: Uncensored Facts, p. 63) notes that the ambulance shell used by Badham to convey Chapman's body to the mortuary was the very same one used previously for Polly Nichols. According to Begg, "when the body was brought through the passage of the house to the street it was greeted by a crowd estimated to number several hundred and described as very excitable."

=== The Mary Jane Kelly murder ===
The Manchester Guardian of 10 November 1888 reported that Sgt. Badham (they called him 'Betham') accompanied Inspector Walter Beck to the site of 13 Miller's Court after they were both notified of the murder of Mary Kelly by a frantic Thomas Bowyer. It is generally accepted that Inspector Beck was the first police official to arrive at the Kelly crime scene and Badham is believed to have accompanied him, but there are no official records to confirm Badham being with him.

Sgt. Badham was also on duty at Commercial Street police station on the evening of 12 November 1888. The inquest into the death of Mary Kelly had been completed earlier that day, when around 6.00pm a man named George Hutchinson arrived at the station claiming he had seen Kelly with a man of "respectable appearance" on the night of her death.

Badham took Hutchinson's initial statement that evening.

About 2 am 9th. I was coming by Thrawl Street Commercial Street, and just before I got to flower and Dean Street, I saw the murdered woman Kelly. And she said to me Hutchinson will you lend me sixpence, I said I can't I have spent all my money going down to Romford. she said good morning I must go and find some money. She went away toward Thrawl Street, a man coming in the opposite direction to Kelly tapped her on the shoulder and said something to her they both burst out laughing. I heard her say (pause ) alright to him. and the man said you will be alright for what I have told you. He then placed his right hand on her shoulders. (Pause ) He also had a kind of small parcel in his left hand with a kind of strap round it. I stood against the lamp of the Ten Bell Queen's Head Public House and watched him. They both then came past me and the man had down his head. with his hat over his eyes. I stooped down and looked him in the face. He looked at me stern.

They both went into Dorset Street I followed them. They both stood at the corner of the Court for about 3 minutes. He said something to her, she said alright my dear come along you will be comfortable. He then placed his arm on her shoulder and gave her a kiss. She said she had lost her handkerchief, he then pulled his handkerchief a red one out and gave it to her. They both then went up the Court together. I then went to the Court to see if I could see them but could not, I stood there for about three quarters of an hour to see if they came out they did not so I went away.

Description age about 34 or 35. Height 5ft 6 complexion pale dark eyes and eye lashed dark slight moustache, curled up each end and hair dark. Very surly looking. Dress, long dark coat. Collar and cuffs trimmed astracan. and a dark jacket. Under, light waistcoat, dark trousers, dark felt hat turned down in the middle button. Boots and gaiters with white buttons. Wore a very thick gold chain white linen collar. Black tie with horse shoe pin. Respectable appearance, walked away, sharp jewish appearance, can be identified.

=== The Alice McKenzie murder ===
On 17 July 1889, Sgt. Badham was again on duty in the vicinity of Castle Alley as he was inspecting the various constables patrolling the area that evening. Just a few moments after he had spoken with P.C. Walter Andrews, 272H, at around 12.48am, Badham heard Andrews' police whistle blow twice. Badham rushed back to Castle Alley, where Andrews had just discovered the lifeless, but still-warm, body of Alice Mackenzie. Badham then enlisted the aid of two nearby constables to search the area and fetch a doctor.

Once again, just as he had done with Chapman and probably Mary Kelly, Sgt. Badham conveyed the body via the police ambulance to the Whitechapel mortuary.

That day, he submitted the following police report (MEPO 3/140 f. 272–273):

Commercial Street Station - Metropolitan Police - H Division - 17 July 1889.

I beg to report that about 12.48 am 17th inst. I visited PC272H Walter Andrews in Castle Alley, Whitechapel. He being on the Beat No. 11 on the 4th Section. I said to him alright he replied alright Sergeant. I then left him and went to visit another P.C. on an adjoining beat. I had only got about 150 yards from P.C.272H when I heard a whistle blow twice.

I rushed to the bottom of Castle Alley and heard P.C. 272H say come on quick he ran up the alley, and I followed, and on the pavement closer to two vans on the right side of the footway I saw a woman laying on her right side with her clothes half up to her waist exposing her abdomen. I also noticed a quantity of blood under her head on the footway. The P.C. said here's another murder. I directed the P.C. not to leave the body or let anyone touch it until the Dr. arrived. The P.C. said it's quite warm as he touched her.

I got the assistance of P.C. 101H here and P.C. 423 Allen. The former P.C. I directed to search the place and sent P.C. 423 for the Doctor, and Inspr. on duty, and upon his return to make search. Other Constables arrived shortly afterwards, also the Local Inspr. Mr. Reid C.I.D. I also hailed a passing cab and acquainted the Superintendent of what had taken place. Several men were drafted in different directions to make enquiries at Lodging Houses and Coffee Houses to see if any suspicious man had recently entered them.

The body was afterwards conveyed by me on the ambulance to the Whitechapel mortuary where the body was searched by Inspr. Reid who gave me a description of the body._Description age about 40 length 5 ft 4 complexion pale hair and eye, brown top of thumb of left hand deficient also tooth deficient in upper jaw. Dress red stuff bodice patched under arms and sleeves with marone one black and one marone stockings brown stuff skirt kilted brown lindsey petticoat, white chemise and apron, paisley shawl. button boots. all old nothing found on person.

Signed, E Badham Sergt, Thos. Hawkes Insp.

Sgt. Badham testified at the inquest later that day and his comments were recorded in the Times on 18 July 1889:

Police-sergeant Badham, 31 H, stated:- About 12 minutes to 1 this morning I was in Old Castle-street and saw Constable Andrews. I went up to him and said, "All right?" He replied, "All right, sergeant." I then left him and went to visit another man on the adjoining beat. I then went to Pell-lane, when I heard two blows from a whistle. I listened for the second blow to ascertain from where it came. On hearing the second whistle I rushed up Newcastle-street and met Andrews who shouted out, "Come on, quick." I threw my cape to the ground and rushed up after him. I saw a woman lying on the pavement on the near side with her throat cut, and her head lying in a pool of blood.

The legs and stomach were exposed. I got the assistance of other constables and blocked up the ends of the alley, and directed Constable 423 H to fetch the doctor and acquaint the doctor on duty. I also directed Constable 101 H to search the place and also the surrounding streets; and Constable 272 H to remain with the body, and not to let any one touch it until the doctor arrived.

Sergeant 21 H and the local inspector came up and made search. They were followed by Detective-Inspector Reid. I also acquainted the superintendent, and directed other constables to make careful inquiry at the lodging-houses, coffee-houses, and places where men were likely to go. In the meantime the doctor arrived. I also made search myself, but failed to find trace of any person that was likely to have committed the murder._[Coroner] Had you been in the alley at all that night? - No.

After this it is believed Badham played no further role in the investigations into the Whitechapel murders attributed to Jack the Ripper.

== Death in a police cell ==
Later, in 1897 while serving on 'R' Division as a Station Police Sergeant, Badham gave evidence at the Coroner's inquest into the death of Norah Sullivan, who had died while being held in police custody at Deptford Police Station. The following article appeared in the Blackheath Gazette on Friday 10 December 1897, Page 3.

An inquest was held at the Deptford Congregational Lecture Hall, by Mr. Wood, deputy-coroner, on Monday afternoon, with reference to the death of Norah Sullivan, aged 52 years, who was found dead in the cells at the Deptford Police Station early on Sunday morning.

Mary Connor, lodging house keeper, of 16 Castle-street, Long Acre, said the deceased was her sister. She did not think her sister had had a home since the death of her husband. A month ago she told witness she was going into the Workhouse. Deceased had been in trouble for many years.

P.C. Angell, 358 R, said about 2:30 on Saturday afternoon he saw the deceased drunk in Queen-street, Deptford, surrounded by a crowd. She refused to go away, and he took her to the station on the police ambulance, and after being charged with drunkenness, she was placed in a cell.

Sergeant Badham, 25 R, said at four o'clock the deceased had coffee and bread-and-butter. He visited her at various periods until six o'clock and every time the deceased said "I'm all right. God bless you, sir."

Inspector Macaulay said he visited the deceased frequently from six to ten o'clock on Saturday evening, when she appeared to be comfortable.

P.C. Arnup, 259 R, said at five minutes past twelve he and Sergeant Ward, 27 R, found the deceased unconscious in the cell. Dr. Carpenter came and said the deceased was dead.

Dr. Carpenter said he made a post mortem examination which showed that the deceased's body was well nourished, but there were signs of chronic bronchitis. The liver was cirrhotic and fat. Death was due to syncope from heart disease, produced by bronchitis and chronic alcoholism.

A verdict in accordance with the medical evidence was returned.
