= George Bagster Phillips =

English medical doctor

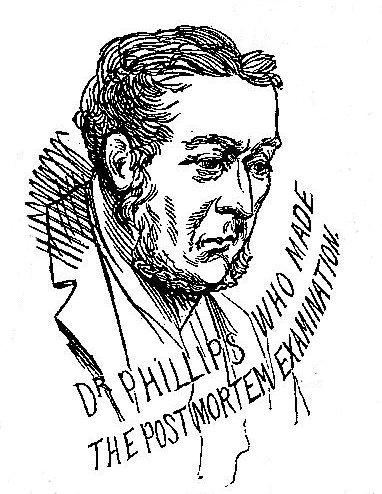
Dr. George Bagster Phillips in 1888

George Bagster Phillips (February 1835 in Camberwell, Surrey – 27 October 1897 in London) was, from 1865, the Police Surgeon for the Metropolitan Police's 'H' Division, which covered London's Whitechapel district. He came to prominence during the murders of Jack the Ripper when he conducted or attended autopsies on the bodies of four of the victims, namely Annie Chapman, Elizabeth Stride, Catherine Eddowes and Mary Jane Kelly. He was called by the police to the murder scenes of three of them: Chapman, Stride and Kelly.

Detective Chief Inspector Walter Dew, who was a detective constable in the Whitechapel CID throughout the Ripper investigation, and who knew Phillips well, remembered him as being in his fifties in 1888. "He was a character," Dew later wrote, " An elderly man, he was ultra old-fashioned both in his personal appearance and his dress. He used to look for all the world as though he had stepped out of a century-old painting. His manners were charming: he was immensely popular both with the police and the public, and he was highly skilled"

Phillips lived at 2 Spital Square in Whitechapel.

== Early career ==
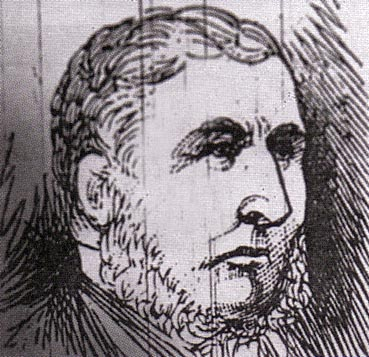
Dr George Bagster Phillips

The son of Sarah (née Bagster) and Henry Phillips, George Bagster Phillips was appointed a member of the Royal College of Surgeons in 1861. Phillips is first mentioned in the British national press in The Times of 24 May 1866, when he attended on James Ashe, who had been cut with a knife and wounded by his brother-in-law, Patrick O'Donnell, a 20-year-old journeyman tailor. Later, in 1870, Phillips was called to the Stepney police station concerning a case of child abuse, when he was asked to examine a 7-year-old girl and the man charged with her sexual assault. He diagnosed both as suffering from gonorrhea and also found that the young girl had a vaginal rupture, which Phillips said was an indication of "violence of some kind".

In 1880 Phillips married Eliza Toms (1838–1940) in Kensington in London.

The Times referred to Phillips again on 6 March 1882 when Mary Ann Macarthy, aged 17 and living in a common lodging-house in Spitalfields, was charged on remand with feloniously cutting and wounding Henry Connor, by stabbing him with a knife. Again, Phillips dressed the wounds of the injured party.

== Annie Chapman ==
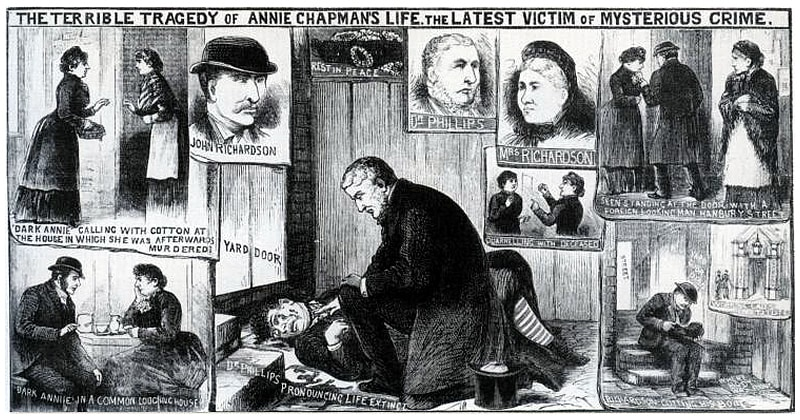
Phillips examines the body of Annie Chapman at 29 Hanbury Street.

Phillips was called by the police to 29 Hanbury Street at 6.20 a.m. on Saturday 8 September 1888 and arrived there at 6.20. He then immediately examined the body of Annie Chapman where it lay in the back yard. He stated that "the body was cold, except that there was a certain remaining heat, under the intestines, in the body." He added that "stiffness of the limbs was not marked, but it was commencing." At the post mortem, conducted at 2.00 p.m. that afternoon, he also noted that "the stomach contained a little food." From this information he estimated Chapman's time of death at some time before 4.30 a.m. However, eyewitnesses claimed that the yard was empty at that time, and at the inquest Coroner Wynne Baxter, who had no medical background, chose the witness testimony over the doctors' opinions and argued that the time of death was 5.30 a.m. After examining Chapman's body he concluded that her reported recent ill health was due to tuberculosis. Phillips also concluded that she had been sober at the time of death and had not consumed alcohol for at least some hours before it. The Lancet quoted Phillips on the surgical proficiency of Chapman's killer. 'Obviously', Phillips wrote, 'the work was that of an expert- or one, at least, who had such knowledge of anatomical or pathological examinations as to be enabled to secure the pelvic organs with one sweep of the knife'. His original opinion, given at 6.20 a.m. was that Chapman had been dead "for two hours, probably more." When a witness, John Richardson, said that he had not seen Chapman's body in the yard when he went there at 4.45 to trim a piece of leather off his boot– when by Phillips' original estimate she would have been dead for over half an hour – the doctor qualified this by saying that with the coldness of the morning and the amount of blood that she had lost, the victim might have appeared to have been dead for longer than she was. This gave credence to the evidence of Mrs Elizabeth Long, who claimed to have seen Chapman alive at 5.30. Chapman was found about 20 minutes after the alleged sighting and Phillips estimated that it would have taken much longer than that to have inflicted all the injuries that he found on her body.

== Elizabeth Stride ==
Phillips was called to Dutfield's Yard in Berner Street at 1.20 a.m. on Sunday, 30 September 1888, to examine the body of Elizabeth Stride. At her inquest, held on 3 October 1888, he reported:

"The body was lying on the near side, with the face turned toward the wall, the head up the yard and the feet toward the street. The left arm was extended and there was a packet of cachous in the left hand.

The right arm was over the belly, the back of the hand and wrist had on it clotted blood. The legs were drawn up with the feet close to the wall. The body and face were warm and the hand cold. The legs were quite warm. Deceased had a silk handkerchief round her neck, and it appeared to be slightly torn. I have since ascertained it was cut. This corresponded with the right angle of the jaw. The throat was deeply gashed and there was an abrasion of the skin about one and a half inches in diameter, apparently stained with blood, under her right arm.

At three o'clock p.m. on Monday at St. George's Mortuary, Dr. Blackwell and I made a post mortem examination. Rigor mortis was still thoroughly marked. There was mud on the left side of the face and it was matted in the head. The body was fairly nourished. Over both shoulders, especially the right, and under the collarbone and in front of the chest there was a bluish discoloration, which I have watched and have seen on two occasions since.

There was a clear-cut incision on the neck. It was six inches in length and commenced two and a half inches in a straight line below the angle of the jaw, one half-inch in over an undivided muscle, and then becoming deeper, dividing the sheath. The cut was very clean and deviated only a little downwards. The arteries and other vessels contained in the sheath were all cut through. The cut through the tissues on the right side was more superficial, and tailed off to about two inches below the right angle of the jaw. The deep vessels on that side were uninjured. From this it was evident that the hemorrhage was caused through the partial severance of the left cartoid artery.

Decomposition had commenced in the skin. Dark brown spots were on the anterior surface of the left chin. There was a deformity in the bones of the right leg, which was not straight, but bowed forwards. There was no recent external injury save to the neck. The body being washed more thoroughly I could see some healing sores. The lobe of the left ear was torn as if from the removal or wearing through of an earring, but it was thoroughly healed. On removing the scalp there was no sign of extravasation of blood.

The heart was small, the left ventricle firmly contracted, and the right slightly so. There was no clot in the pulmonary artery, but the right ventricle was full of dark clot. The left was firmly contracted as to be absolutely empty. The stomach was large and the mucous membrane only congested. It contained partly digested food, apparently consisting of cheese, potato, and farinaceous powder. All the teeth on the lower left jaw were absent."

== Catherine Eddowes ==
Catherine Eddowes was killed in the City of London, and so her murder came within the jurisdiction of the City of London Police, who had their own police surgeon, Dr. Frederick Gordon Brown. He was called to the murder scene at Mitre Square. However, because of his familiarity with the Ripper's previous victims, Phillips was called by the Metropolitan Police to take part in Eddowes's autopsy. In his opinion the way in which the incisions were made could only have been the work of someone who had knowledge of anatomical or pathological examinations.

== Mary Jane Kelly ==
Together with Dr Thomas Bond, Phillips examined the remains of Mary Jane Kelly on 9 November 1888. At the inquest, Phillips reported:

"I was called by the police on Friday morning at eleven o'clock, and on proceeding to Miller's Court, which I entered at 11.15. I found a room, the door of which led out of the passage at the side of 26, Dorset street, photographs of which I produce. It had two windows in the court. Two panes in the lesser window were broken, and as the door was locked I looked through the lower of the broken panes and satisfied myself that the mutilated corpse lying on the bed was not in need of any immediate attention from me, and I also came to the conclusion that there was nobody else upon the bed, or within view, to whom I could render any professional assistance. Having ascertained that probably it was advisable that no entrance should be made into the room at that time, I remained until about 1.30p.m., when the door was broken open by McCarthy, under the direction of Superintendent Arnold.

On the door being opened it knocked against a table which was close to the left-hand side of the bedstead, and the bedstead was close against the wooden partition. The mutilated remains of a woman were lying two-thirds over, towards the edge of the bedstead, nearest the door. Deceased had only an under-linen garment upon her, and by subsequent examination I am sure the body had been removed, after the injury which caused death, from that side of the bedstead which was nearest to the wooden partition previously mentioned. The large quantity of blood under the bedstead, the saturated condition of the palliasse, pillow, and sheet at the top corner of the bedstead nearest to the partition leads me to the conclusion that the severance of the right carotid artery, which was the immediate cause of death, was inflicted while the deceased was lying at the right side of the bedstead and her head and neck in the top right-hand corner".

This was only general evidence. The coroner, Dr Roderick MacDonald, had told the jury that they would hear Dr Phillips' full post mortem report at "the adjourned inquest" – clearly indicating that there would be a further session, as had happened with the previous victims. However, after hearing a few more witnesses, he said that he did not know if the jury wished to bring in a verdict – all they had to go was agree on the cause of death, "leaving other matters in the hands of the police" and there was no point in continually going over the same matters. The jury conferred quickly, then said that they wished to bring in a verdict of "Wilful murder against a person or persons unknown." MacDonald then closed the inquest. Consequently, the coroner had not complied with the legal requisite that the length, breadth and depths of all wounds to the deceased must be recorded and, with conflicting evidence having been given to the inquest, the time of death had not been established. Phillips had conferred in private with the coroner before the hearing opened, something he had wanted to do at a previous inquest but had been refused.

== Later cases ==
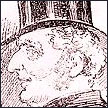
Dr George Bagster Phillips

During the later Whitechapel murder investigation, Phillips performed the post-mortem examination of Alice McKenzie (nicknamed "Clay Pipe" Alice and who used the alias Alice Bryant), who was killed on 17 July 1889 in Castle Alley in Whitechapel. At the coroner's inquest on 22 July 1889, Phillips stated that the injuries to her throat had been caused by someone who "knew the position of the vessels, at any rate where to cut with reference to causing speedy death." She had two jagged wounds in the left side of her neck. Phillips also found five superficial marks on the left side of McKenzie's abdomen, which had been made, he thought, by the pressure of a right thumb and fingers prior to mutilating her body with a knife that was held in the murderer's left hand.

Phillips was involved in investigating "The Pinchin Street Murder," a term coined after the headless and legless torso of a woman was found under a railway arch in Pinchin Street in Whitechapel on 10 September 1889. After examining the medical evidence Phillips, Commissioner James Monro and Chief Inspector Donald Swanson concluded that the murder was not committed by Jack the Ripper

He also performed the autopsy on Frances Coles (also known as Frances Coleman, Frances Hawkins and nicknamed "Carrotty Nell"), born in 1865 and killed on 13 February 1891. He believed that the minor wounds on the back of her head suggested that she was thrown violently to the ground before her throat was cut three times. Otherwise there were no mutilations to the body. Phillips did not believe that her murderer displayed any medical knowledge. Cole's body was found under a railway arch in Swallow Gardens, Whitechapel.

His obituary in The Lancet on 13 November 1897 described Phillips as "a leading police surgeon in London". In it he was described by his assistant, Dr. Percy John Clark, as "a modest man who found self-advertising abhorrent... under a brusque, quick manner engendered by his busy life, there was a warm, kind heart, and a large number of men and women of all classes are feeling that by his death they have lost a very real friend".

Phillips died from apoplexy on 27 October 1897.

== Portrayal in film ==
He was played by Geoffrey Rose in the 1973 TV series Jack the Ripper.

In the 1988 made-for-television film Jack the Ripper starring Michael Caine, Phillips was played by actor Gerald Sim.
