= John Pizer =

English bootmaker (1850–1897)

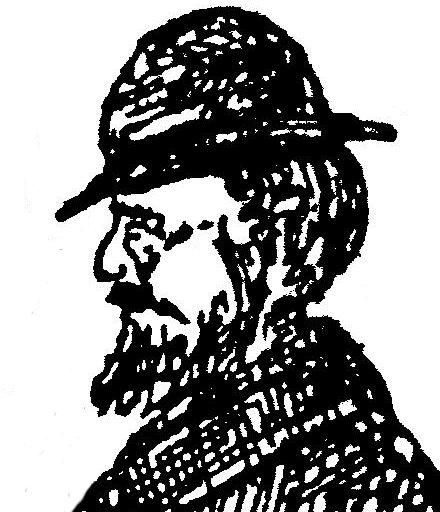
- Undated portrait of Pizer
- Born: Jacob Pizer; 21 September 1850; Aldgate, London, England
- Died: 5 July 1897 (aged 46); Whitechapel, London, England
- Other names: John Piser
- Occupation: Bootmaker
- Known for: Jack the Ripper suspect

John Pizer (21 September 1850 – 7 July 1897) was an English bootmaker in Whitechapel, London. He was the first person accused of being the perpetrator in the Whitechapel murders, but was cleared of suspicion after providing alibis for the two murders committed until that point. He was still called as a witness to the murder inquest of Annie Chapman.

== Background ==
Pizer was born in London in 1850. His biological mother died when Pizer was three years old and his father died around 1872. Locals told The Scotsman that he lived in Whitechapel since at least 1861 and while described as a Polish Jew, he did not speak with an accent. He regularly resided on 22 Mulberry Street with his brother Gabriel, their stepmother Augusta, and Gabriel's wife Leah. He was a bootmaker by trade, but unemployed at the time of the Whitechapel murders, living away from home at various boarding houses throughout London.

=== Government records ===
The 31 March 1851 census list a John Piza, aged seven months and registered at St James Duke's Place, living at 24 Mitre Street. His parents were Israel Piza, born in Poland, and Abigail Piza (née Moss), born in Surrey. The Great Synagogue of London listed the marriage of Israel "Shmuel" Pizer and Abigail "Edel" Moss on 10 August 1842. The only birth registered under their names in the fourth quarter of 1850 was Jacob Pizer, born 21 September. In the 7 April 1861 census, Israel Pizer and Augusta "Gusta" Chlebouski, born in Germany, were recorded at 32 Gowers Walk, with two children, Janet and Samuel Gabriel Pizer. John Piser, aged 10 with the birthplace Aldgate, was listed at German Jews Hospital in Stepney. Abigail Piza died in 1853 and Israel Peiser died in 1871.

=== Criminal history ===
On 6 July 1887, Pizer went to the shop of rival shoemaker James Willis on Morgan Street, walked up to the window and said "No wonder I can't get any work when you have got it all". Willis told him to leave and upon approaching the window, Pizer lunged at Willis with a knife. Pizer aimed for Willis' face but instead stabbed him in the hand. On 7 July, Pizer was sentenced to six months of hard labour for a stabbing offence. His name was misspelled as "John Pozer" by The Times.

On 4 August 1888, Pizer was tried at Thames Magistrates' Court for a charge of indecent assault. Pizer was accused of threatening a woman named Sara Jones with a knife over a financial matter, but the case was dismissed when Jones failed to appear.

==== "Leather Apron" ====
Police Sergeant William Thick apparently believed that Pizer had committed a string of minor assaults on prostitutes over several years. News reports claimed that Pizer was "ill-using" sex workers, but more detailed articles specify that he extorted and mugged the women at knifepoint. Through witness descriptions, Pizer became locally known by the nickname "Leather Apron" because of a noticeable apron he wore during the attacks. Pizer himself initially denied being known as "Leather Apron" until informed by Thick, but at the subsequent inquest, he conceded to being aware of the nickname.

== Involvement in the Jack the Ripper murders ==
On 4 September 1888, newspapers publicly named "Leather Apron" as a suspect sought for the murder of Mary Ann Nichols on 31 August, largely due to the shared victim type and brutality of the crimes. However, police records did not list "Leather Apron" in their investigation until 6 September. Pizer was quickly identified as fitting the given description of "Leather Apron", but could not be located. Pizer later admitted to knowing about the search effort and going into hiding for fear of being injured or lynched by angry townsfolk. He had already been trying to keep a low profile after he was recognised as "Leather Apron" by previous mugging victims in Spitalfields on 2 September, resulting in him being chased from his lodgings by a crowd of onlookers. He subsequently lived on Peter Street in Westminster before returning to his brother's residence.

Following the murder of Annie Chapman on 8 September 1888, there were renewed public appeals by newspapers for the arrest of "Leather Apron", due to a leather apron being found at the crime scene. Said apron was later identified as belonging to resident John Richardson, whose mother had left it out to dry in the yard. The same day, some contemporary newspapers began to speculate that "Leather Apron" may have been an invention by the press.

Sergeant Thick and two other officer went to Pizer on 10 September, greeting him with the words, "You are just the man I want" and arresting him on suspicion of Chapman's murder. Several knives were also confiscated from the home. While he was held at Leman Street Police Station, a crowd gathered outside to catch a glimpse of "Leather Apron". The arrest occurred even though the investigating inspector reported that "there is no evidence whatsoever against him".

Witnesses related to the murders of Mary Ann Nichols and Annie Chapman did not identify Pizer as a suspect when presented with him. Chapman's landlord Timothy Donovan stated that he had ejected a man resembling Pizer from his tenant's room a few months earlier. Emanuel Violenia, a resident of Hanbury Street who picked Pizer out of a police lineup, claimed to have seen him in company of a woman on the night of Nichols' murder and that he threatened her with a knife later on. Police found Violenia unreliable, however, since he could not identify Chapman by appearance at the mortuary. Chief Inspector Frederick Abberline concluded that Violenia invented his testimony as an excuse to see Chapman's body and to gain public attention.

Pizer was cleared of suspicion when it turned out that he had alibis for two of the murders. In the Nichols case, he had been talking with a police officer in Holloway while watching a spectacular fire on the London Docks, with the proprietor of a boarding house also confirming his presence later that night. During Chapman's murder, Pizer had been staying with relatives, having not left the house since 6 September to avoid being discovered. During the inquest of Annie Chapman, Pizer and Sergeant Thick stated that they had known each other for eighteen years, with Pizer implying that his arrest was based on animosity rather than evidence. Pizer suffered from chronic health issues due to a hernia, which would have made it difficult to overpower the victims in the same manner as the murderer in both cases did.

Police waited a day for the mass of people outside the station to disperse before Pizer was released on the evening of 11 September, returning to Mulberry Street, where family and neighbours received him.

=== Aftermath ===
Following his testimony at the inquest, Pizer again denied being known as "Leather Apron", supported by family and friends. Pizer successfully obtained monetary compensation in libel lawsuits from at least one newspaper that had named him as the murderer. He received £10 (equivalent to £1,407 in 2023) compensation from Harry Dam of The Star. Additionally, on 11 October 1888, he successfully sued Emily Patsworth for calling him "Leather Apron" and assaulting him, for which she was fined £50 (equivalent to £7,035 in 2023).

Thick himself was accused of being the Ripper by H. T. Haslewood of Tottenham in a letter to the Home Office dated 10 September 1889; the presumably malicious accusation was dismissed as without foundation.

Pizer died of gastroenteritis on 5 July 1897 at Royal London Hospital. He was buried on Plashet Jewish Cemetery on 7 July.
