= Mary Ann Nichols =

First canonical victim of Jack the Ripper (1845–1888)

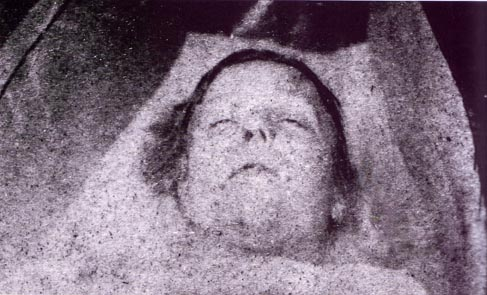
- Mortuary photograph of Mary Ann Nichols
- Born: Mary Ann Walker; 26 August 1845; London, England
- Died: 31 August 1888 (aged 43); Whitechapel, London, England
- Cause of death: Syncope due to haemorrhage caused by the severance of the carotid arteries
- Body discovered: Buck's Row (Durward Street), Whitechapel, London, England; 51.5200°N 0.0605°W
- Resting place: City of London Cemetery, Manor Park, London, England; 51.55759°N 0.053368°E (approximate)
- Occupations: Domestic servant, prostitute
- Known for: First canonical victim of Jack the Ripper
- Spouse: William Nichols (m. 1864; sep. 1880)
- Children: 5
- Parent(s): Edward Walker; Caroline Walker (née Webb)

Mary Ann Nichols, known as Polly Nichols (née Walker; 26 August 1845 – 31 August 1888), was the first canonical victim of the unidentified serial killer known as Jack the Ripper, who is believed to have murdered and mutilated at least five women in and around the Whitechapel district of London between late August and early November 1888.

The two earlier murders linked to the Whitechapel murderer are unlikely to have been committed by Jack the Ripper. When Nichols's murder was first associated with the series, it heightened both press and public interest in the criminal activity and general living conditions of the inhabitants of London's East End.

== Early life ==
Mary Ann Walker was born on 26 August 1845 in either Dean Street, off Fetter Lane in London, or Dawes Court, Shoe Lane (off Fleet Street), London. She was the second of three children of Edward Walker, a locksmith who later worked as a blacksmith, and his wife, Caroline (née Webb), a laundress. Little is known of her early childhood, although records indicate that she had been christened by 1851.

At the age of eighteen, Walker married William Nichols, a printer's machinist. The ceremony took place on 16 January 1864 at Saint Bride's Parish Church in the City of London, with Seth George Havelly and Sarah Good acting as witnesses. After their marriage, the couple briefly lodged at 30–31 Bouverie Street before moving to 131 Trafalgar Street to live with Walker's father. Between 1866 and 1879, they had five children: Edward John (b. 1866), Percy George (b. 1868), Alice Esther (b. 1870), Eliza Sarah (b. 1877), and Henry Alfred (b. 1879).

Nichols was 5 ft 2 in (1.57 m) tall, with brown eyes, high cheekbones, and dark brown hair that had begun to grey by the time of her death.

== Separation ==
On 6 September 1880, the couple moved into their own home at 6 D-Block, Peabody Buildings, Stamford Street, Blackfriars Road, paying a weekly rent of 5s. 9d. Shortly afterwards, they separated, and William later relocated with four of their children to an address near Old Kent Road.

Nichols's father accused William of abandoning his daughter after conducting an affair with the nurse who had attended the birth of their final child. William, however, claimed to have proof that the marriage had continued for at least three years after the date of the alleged affair. He stated that their marital difficulties had been caused by his wife's heavy drinking, and that he had begun an affair only after Nichols had left him. He later told authorities that his wife had deserted him and was supporting herself through prostitution. (Note: Contemporary police reports also list the reason for the couple's separation as Nichols's drunken behaviour.)

Over the following years, Nichols accumulated a lengthy police record, although all of her arrests were for minor offences, including drunkenness, disorderly conduct, and prostitution.

=== 1881–1887 ===
By 1881, Nichols was living at Lambeth Workhouse, where she described herself as a charwoman. She left the workhouse on 31 May. Her movements for much of the following year are uncertain, although she returned to Lambeth Workhouse on 24 April 1882. She later lived with her father in Walworth for several months in 1883, leaving his home after a quarrel.

William Nichols, who was legally required to support his estranged wife, initially paid her a weekly allowance of five shillings. These payments ceased in the spring of 1882 after he received word that she was working as a prostitute. Nichols responded by sending a summons through the Lambeth Union requesting that the allowance continue. When parish authorities attempted to collect the maintenance money, William stated that his wife had deserted her family, leaving their children in his care, and was living with another man while earning money through prostitution. As he was not legally obliged to support her if she was receiving income through illicit means, Nichols received no further maintenance.

Nichols spent most of her remaining years in workhouses and lodging houses, relying on charitable relief and her limited earnings as a prostitute, although she frequently spent her income on alcohol. By 1887, she had formed a relationship with a widower and father of three named Thomas Stuart Drew, but the couple separated on 24 October. By December 1887, Nichols was sleeping rough in Trafalgar Square, although a clearance of the area on 19 December led to her returning to Lambeth Workhouse. On this occasion, she remained there for less than two weeks.

== 1888 ==
In April 1888, the matron of Lambeth Workhouse, Mrs Fielder, found Nichols employment as a domestic servant in the household of Mr and Mrs Cowdry in Wandsworth. Shortly after taking the position, Nichols wrote to her father expressing her satisfaction with the post, stating: "I just write to say you will be glad to know that I am settled in my new place, and going on all right up to now. My people went out yesterday, and have not returned, so I am in charge. It's a grand place inside, with trees and gardens back and front. All has been newly done up. They are teetotallers, and religious, so I ought to get on. They are very nice people, and I have not too much to do. I hope you are all right and the boy has work. So goodbye for the present. From yours truly, Polly."

Possibly because Nichols was an alcoholic and her employers were teetotallers, she left the position after three months, stealing clothing worth £3 10s. and absconding from the premises. Her father learned of this incident via a postcard dated 12 July, sent in response to his attempt to write to her.

By the summer of 1888, Nichols was living in a common lodging-house at 18 Thrawl Street, Spitalfields, where she shared a bed with an elderly woman named Emily "Nelly" Holland. On 24 August, she moved to another common lodging-house at 56 Flower and Dean Street, Whitechapel.

=== 30–31 August ===
At approximately 11:00 pm on 30 August, Nichols was seen walking along Whitechapel Road. She visited the Frying Pan public house in Brick Lane, Spitalfields, leaving at 12:30 am on 31 August. By 1:20 am, she had returned to the kitchen of her Flower and Dean Street lodging-house. Fifty minutes later, she was seen by the deputy lodging house keeper, who asked her for the 4d required for her bed. When Nichols replied that she did not have the money, she was ordered to leave the premises. Unconcerned, she motioned to her new black velvet bonnet and replied: "I'll soon get my doss money. See what a jolly bonnet I've got now." She then left the lodging-house, likely intending to earn the money needed to pay for a bed through prostitution.

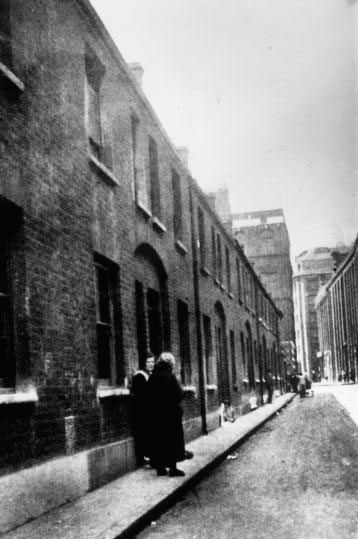
Buck's Row, site of the murder of Mary Ann Nichols

Nichols was last seen alive by Emily Holland, who encountered her walking alone down Osborn Street at approximately 2:30 am, about an hour before her death. Holland later stated that Nichols appeared noticeably drunk, at one point slumping against the wall of a grocer's shop. She attempted to persuade Nichols to return to her Thrawl Street lodging-house, but Nichols refused, saying, "I have had my lodging money three times today, and I have spent it." Holland observed that Nichols seemed unconcerned about her prospects of earning the 4d. required for her bed. The two women then parted, with Nichols walking towards Whitechapel Road.

== Murder ==
At 3:40 am on 31 August, a carman named Charles Allen Cross (born Lechmere) discovered what he initially believed to be a tarpaulin lying on the ground in front of a gated stable entrance in Buck's Row (renamed Durward Street in 1892), Whitechapel, as he walked to his place of employment in Broad Street. (Note: In 1888, Buck's Row was a narrow and poorly illuminated cobbled street, lined on one side by warehouse buildings and a row of two-storey houses on the other.) The location was approximately 150 yards from the London Hospital (now the Royal London Hospital) and 100 yards from Blackwall Buildings.

On closer inspection, Cross realised that the object was the body of a woman. She was lying on her back with her eyes open, her legs straight, her skirt raised above her knees, and her left hand touching the gate of the stable entrance. (Note: Contemporary newspaper accounts describe this gate as being approximately nine feet in height.) A second carman, Robert Paul, approached as he made his way to work and saw Cross standing in the road, looking at the body. Cross called him over, and the two men examined her. Cross touched the woman's face, which was still warm, and then her hands, which were cold. He told Paul that he believed she was dead, although Paul thought she might simply be unconscious. The two pulled her skirt down to cover her lower body, then went in search of a policeman. They encountered PC Jonas Mizen at the corner of Hanbury Street and Baker's Row. Cross informed him of their discovery, adding, "She looks to me to be either dead or drunk, but for my part, I believe she's dead." The two men then continued on their way to work, leaving Mizen to investigate.

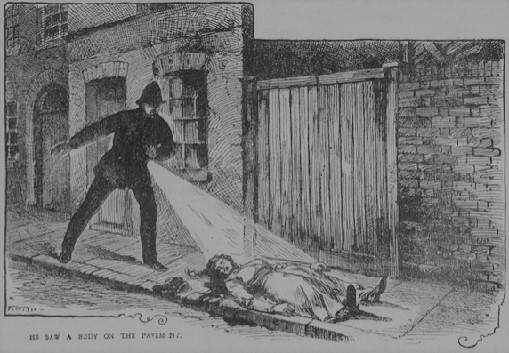
Contemporary newspaper illustration depicting the discovery of Nichols's body

Shortly before PC Mizen reached Buck's Row, PC John Neil approached the street from the opposite direction on his beat and illuminated Nichols's body with his lantern. By flashing the lantern, Neil attracted the attention of PC John Thain as Thain passed the entrance to Buck’s Row, calling out, "Here's a woman with her throat cut. Run at once for Dr Llewellyn." Neil then examined the scene for blood trails but found none. He also inspected the road and observed no wheel marks.

PC Thain fetched surgeon Dr Llewellyn, who arrived in Buck's Row at 4:00 am. Llewellyn noted two deep knife wounds to the woman's throat and quickly pronounced life extinct, estimating from the warmth of her body and legs that she had been dead for approximately thirty minutes. He instructed PC Neil to remove the body to the Old Montague Street Mortuary on a handcart fetched by Mizen, stating, "Move the woman to the mortuary; she is dead. I will make a further examination of her." (Note: The removal of Nichols's body from the ground revealed a spot of congealed blood approximately six inches in diameter, with a trickle running into the gutter. PC Thain described this discovery as a "mass of congealed blood" beneath Nichols's body.)

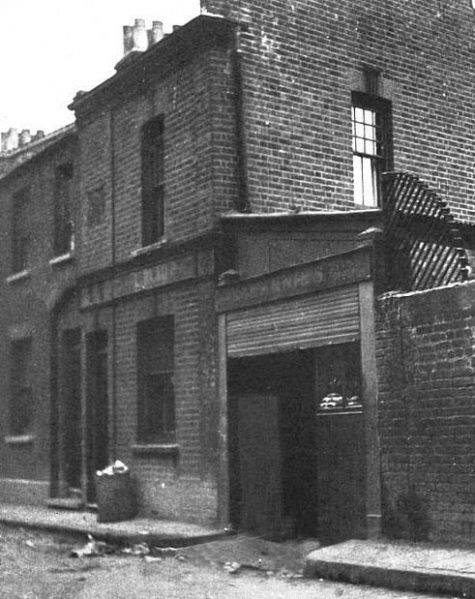
The body of Mary Ann Nichols was discovered at this gated stable entrance in Buck's Row.

As news of the murder spread, several people converged on the scene. Among them were three horse-slaughterers from a neighbouring knacker's yard in Winthrop Street: Harry Tomkins, James Mumford, and Charles Britten. PC Thain had informed them of the discovery as he passed their yard on his way to fetch Dr Llewellyn. All three men were questioned, with Tomkins and Britten admitting that they had left their workplace at 12:20 am for approximately thirty minutes, possibly to visit the nearby Roebuck public house. All three were eliminated as suspects. Police also questioned every tenant of Buck's Row, including the residents of the house closest to where Nichols's body had been found. Although several occupants had been awake during the early hours, none reported seeing or hearing anything unusual. Likewise, all police officers patrolling along or near Buck's Row in the early hours of 31 August stated that they had observed nothing suspicious before the discovery of Nichols's body. (Note: PC Neil had observed nothing suspicious at 3:15 a.m. on his last beat through Buck's Row.)

=== Post-mortem ===
Nichols's body was moved to the Old Montague Street Mortuary at 5:20 am. The injuries to her abdomen were first noticed by Inspector Spratling, who immediately sent for Dr Llewellyn, the surgeon who had earlier examined the body at the scene.

Upon further examination, Dr Llewellyn discovered that both sides of her face had been bruised by either a fist or the pressure of a thumb before her throat wounds had been inflicted from left to right. One of these two wounds measured eight inches and the other four inches in length; both reached back to her vertebral column. Her vagina had been stabbed twice, and her abdomen had been mutilated with one deep, jagged wound two or three inches from the left side. Several further incisions had been made across her abdomen, causing her bowels to protrude through the wounds, and three or four similar cuts ran down the right side of her body. These injuries had been inflicted with the same knife, estimated to be at least 6–8 inches (15–20 cm) long and possibly a cork-cutter's or shoemaker's knife. Each wound had been delivered in a violent, downward thrusting manner. Llewellyn also stated his belief that the murderer possessed some anatomical knowledge. No organs were missing.

Llewellyn estimated that the injuries would have taken four to five minutes to inflict, and he expressed surprise at the small amount of blood at the crime scene, describing it as "about enough to fill two large wine glasses, or half a pint at the outside". (Note: This comment led to the supposition that Nichols was not killed where her body was found, but the blood from her wounds had soaked into her clothes and hair. However, there was little doubt Nichols had been murdered at the actual crime scene as evidenced by the blood beneath the two slash wounds to her throat.) He believed Nichols had been facing her attacker when he placed a hand across her mouth before cutting her throat. Death would have been instantaneous, and all the abdominal injuries – completed in less than five minutes – had been inflicted after death. Llewellyn determined this because wounds made to a body post‑mortem do not produce blood spatter and may result in only limited blood loss. (Note: Although Dr Llewellyn initially determined Nichols's murderer was a left-handed individual, he later expressed doubt over this initial thought. Nonetheless, the belief that the killer was left-handed endured.)

== Identification ==
An examination of Nichols's possessions revealed that she carried no form of identification at the time of her death; her only belongings were a white pocket handkerchief, a comb, and a piece of mirror. Her petticoats, however, were marked 'Lambeth Workhouse P.R.' indicating she may have resided at the workhouse on Princess Road, which had only opened in 1887. Although the matron of this workhouse was unable to identify the body, a workhouse inmate named Mary Ann Monk positively identified the decedent as Mary Ann Nichols at 7:30 pm on 31 August. Earlier that afternoon, Emily Holland had also identified the deceased as "Polly" Nichols. This identification was corroborated the following day by William Nichols, who reportedly exclaimed upon confirming her identity, "I forgive you, as you are, for what you have been to me."

== Inquest ==
The official inquest into Nichols's death opened at the Working Lads' Institute on Whitechapel Road on Saturday, 1 September. Proceedings were presided over by the Middlesex coroner, Wynne Edwin Baxter. (Note: As Nichols's murder had occurred in the territory of the Bethnal Green Division of the Metropolitan Police Service, it was initially investigated by the local detectives, inspectors John Spratling and Joseph Helson, who had little success.) On the first day, the jury was sworn in and taken by the coroner's assistant to view Nichols's body at the mortuary in Pavilion Yard before reconvening at the Working Lads' Institute.

Three witnesses testified on the opening day. The first was Nichols's father, who stated that his daughter had been separated from her husband for "about seven or eight years", that he had not seen her since Easter, and that she had no known enemies. PC John Neil also gave evidence, describing his discovery of Nichols's body and noting that the location was dimly lit, the nearest illumination being "a street lamp shining at the end of the row". Recounting the scene and his call for assistance, Neil stated: "Deceased was lying lengthways along the street, her left hand touching the gate. I examined the body by the aid of my lamp, and noticed blood oozing from a wound in the throat. She was lying on her back, with her clothes disarranged. I felt her arm, which was quite warm from the joints upwards. Her eyes were wide open. Her bonnet was off and lying at her side, close to the left hand. I heard a constable passing Brady Street, so I called him." In response to questions from the coroner, Neil acknowledged that Whitechapel Road was "fairly busy" even at that hour, and that the murderer could have escaped in that direction.

The final witness to testify on the first day was Dr Llewellyn. His testimony, as reported in The Times on 3 September, stated:

Five of the teeth were missing, and there was a slight laceration of the tongue. There was a bruise running along the lower part of the jaw on the right side of the face. That might have been caused by a blow from a fist or pressure from a thumb. There was a circular bruise on the left side of the face which also might have been inflicted by the pressure of the fingers. On the left side of the neck, about 1in. below the jaw, there was an incision about 4in. in length, and ran from a point immediately below the ear. On the same side, but an inch below, and commencing about 1in. in front of it, was a circular incision, which terminated at a point about 3in. below the right jaw. That incision completely severed all the tissues down to the vertebrae. The large vessels of the neck on both sides were severed. The incision was about 8in. in length. The cuts must have been caused by a long-bladed knife, moderately sharp, and used with great violence.
No blood was found on the breast, either of the body or the clothes. There were no injuries about the body until just about the lower part of the abdomen. Two or three inches from the left side was a wound running in a jagged manner. The wound was a very deep one, and the tissues were cut through. There were several incisions running across the abdomen. There were three or four similar cuts running downwards, on the right side, all of which had been caused by a knife which had been used violently and downwards. The injuries were from left to right and might have been done by a left-handed person. All the injuries had been [caused] by the same instrument.

Following Llewellyn's testimony, the inquest was adjourned until 3 September. (Note: Llewellyn was recalled to testify at the inquest on 17 September. On this occasion, he testified that no viscera were missing from Nichols's body.)

=== Police testimony ===
Inspector John Spratling gave evidence on the second day of the inquest. (Note: Inspectors Joseph Helson and Frederick Abberline were also in attendance at the second day of the inquest into Nichols's murder.) He testified that he heard of the murder at 4:30 am, by which time Nichols's body had already been taken to the mortuary. Spratling confirmed that only PC Neil's beat required him to walk through Buck's Row, and his own questioning of several residents revealed that none had seen or heard anything unusual. Also to testify was horse-slaughterer Harry Tomkins, who stated that he had not left his workplace after 1:00 am on 31 August and that neither he nor his colleagues had heard anything untoward. Asked about the noise level in the yard, Tomkins described it as "very quiet", although he conceded he had been too far from the crime scene to have heard any cries for help.

Two police officers followed Tomkins to the stand. Inspector Joseph Helson testified that, in his opinion, the deceased had not been carried to the spot where her body was found. PC Jonas Mizen stated that he had been informed of a woman lying in Buck's Row by a carman at 3:45 am on Friday morning, and that upon arriving at the scene, PC Neil immediately instructed him to fetch a handcart.

Charles Cross followed PC Mizen to the stand. He testified that he discovered Nichols's body while walking to work, initially mistaking it for a tarpaulin, before realising it was a woman. He then heard the footsteps of Robert Paul approaching behind him and motioned to him, saying, "Come and look over here; there is a woman lying on the pavement." Cross stated that Paul had touched Nichols's chest and said, "I think she is breathing, but very little, if she is." As both men were late for work, they left the woman where she lay, resolving to report their discovery to the first policeman they encountered.

Asked why neither man had noted the wounds to Nichols's throat, Cross replied that Buck's Row was poorly illuminated.

=== Character testimony ===
William Nichols also testified on the second day of the inquest. He stated that he had not seen his wife for approximately three years, and that she had left him of her own accord because of her alcoholism. He further testified that he had no knowledge of her whereabouts or activities in the years immediately preceding her murder.

Two women who had known Nichols after her separation from her husband then gave evidence. Emily Holland testified that she had lived in the same common lodging-house as Nichols during the summer of 1888, and had known her to be a "quiet woman" who mostly kept to herself. Holland stated that she had not seen Nichols for about ten days before encountering her by chance on Osborne Street in the early hours of 31 August, when Nichols said she would soon be returning to her lodging-house. Mary Ann Monk then testified that she had seen Nichols entering a pub on New Kent Road at approximately 7:00 pm on the evening before her murder. Monk added that she had no knowledge of how Nichols earned her living.

=== Day three ===
The third day of the inquest was held on Monday, 17 September. Eight witnesses testified, including Mrs Emma Green, a widow who lived with her three children in the cottage immediately beside the stable entrance where Nichols's body had been found. Green stated that she had heard nothing unusual on the night of the murder and that, although rowdy individuals often passed along Buck's Row, the houses were occupied by hardworking people. PC John Thain also gave evidence, stating that his beat typically took him past Buck's Row every thirty minutes and that he had been signalled into the street by PC Neil at 3:45 am. Thain testified he had been immediately dispatched to fetch Dr Llewellyn, and that the body was taken to the mortuary while he remained in Buck's Row. He then searched Essex Wharf, the Great Eastern Railway arches, and the District Railway for evidence, but found nothing.

Two of the final witnesses to testify on 17 September were the keeper of the Old Montague Street Mortuary, Robert Mann, and an inmate of the Whitechapel Workhouse named James Hatfield. Mann stated that he had placed the body inside the mortuary at 5:00 am, adding that her clothes had not been cut before he and Hatfield removed them. Hatfield then testified he and Mann – contrary to instructions given by Sergeant Enright – had taken off all Nichols's clothing in preparation for Dr Llewellyn's arrival.

Following Hatfield's testimony, the coroner adjourned proceedings until 22 September.

== Conclusion ==
On the final day of hearings, signalman Thomas Ede was recalled to expand upon testimony he had given on the third day, concerning his having seen a man named Henry James walking with a knife protruding from his pocket at noon on the day of Annie Chapman's murder. (Note: By the time the inquest into Nichols's death had concluded, the second canonical victim of Jack the Ripper, Annie Chapman, had also been murdered. Separate police investigations into both murders were subsequently merged.)

At the close of proceedings, coroner Baxter informed the jury that the condition of Nichols's body appeared to prove conclusively that she had been murdered at the location where she was found. Addressing the murderer's ability to escape detection, Baxter stated: "It seems astonishing, at first thought, that the culprit should have escaped detection, for there must surely have been marks of blood about his person. If, however, blood was principally on his hands, the presence of so many slaughterhouses in the neighbourhood would make the frequenters of this spot familiar with bloodstained clothes and hands, and his appearance might in that way have failed to attract attention while he passed from Buck's Row in the twilight into Whitechapel Road, and was lost sight of in the morning's market traffic." Baxter then referred to the two earlier Whitechapel murders and the 8 September murder of Annie Chapman, telling the jury: "We cannot altogether leave unnoticed the fact that the death that you have been investigating is one of four presenting many points of similarity, all of which have occurred within the space of about five months, and all within a very short distance of the place where we are sitting. All four victims were women of middle age, all were married, and had lived apart from their husbands in consequence of intemperate habits, and were at the time of their death leading an irregular life."

Highlighting the direct similarities between Nichols's murder and that of Annie Chapman as – opposed to the earlier murders of Emma Smith and Martha Tabram – Baxter elaborated: "The similarity of the injuries in the [murders of Nichols and Chapman] is considerable. There are bruises about the face in both cases; the head is nearly severed from the body in both cases; there are other dreadful injuries in both cases; and those injuries again have in each case been performed with anatomical knowledge ... I suggest to you as a possibility that these two women may have been murdered by the same man with the same object." He further dismissed the possibility that Nichols's murder was connected with the two earlier Whitechapel murders, noting that the weapon used in those cases was significantly different, and that neither victim had received slash wounds to the throat or any disembowelment.

After a twenty-minute deliberation, the jury – having been instructed to consider precisely how, when, and by what means Nichols met her death – returned a verdict of: "Wilful murder against some person or persons unknown."

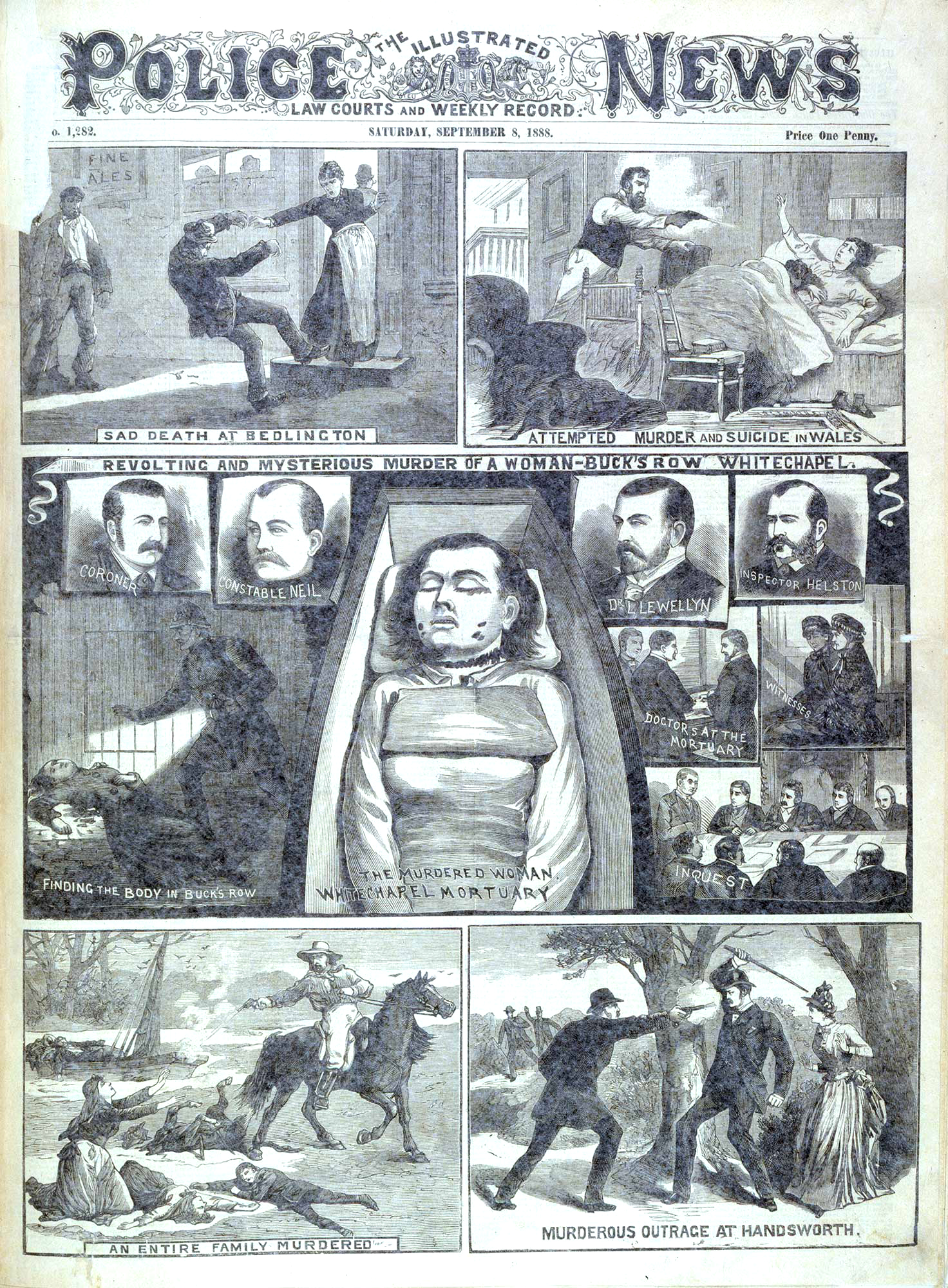
8 September 1888 edition of The Illustrated Police News depicting the inquest into Nichols's murder

== Press reaction ==
Nichols's murder had occurred within a 300-yard radius of the previous murders of Emma Smith and Martha Tabram, and all three murders had taken place within less than five months. Although the modus operandi in each case differed, the geographical proximity led sections of the press to link the three murders. Some newspaper editors also suggested that Nichols's murder may have been the work of a gang, as had earlier been speculated in relation to Smith's murder.

In the days following Nichols's murder, sections of the Radical press – particularly reporters for The Star – capitalised on the brutality of the murders to vilify Police Commissioner Sir Charles Warren, falsely claiming as early as 1 September that widespread dissatisfaction with Warren existed within the Metropolitan Police. A reporter for The Star, Ernest Parke also suggested in the 31 August edition that a single killer was responsible. Other publications soon adopted this narrative.

Suspicions that a serial killer might be active in the East End led to the secondment of Detective Inspectors Frederick Abberline, Henry Moore, and Walter Andrews from the Central Office at Scotland Yard.

The subsequent murders of Elizabeth Stride and Catherine Eddowes the week after the inquest closed, and that of Mary Jane Kelly on 9 November, were also linked by a similar modus operandi. By October 1888, the press and public alike attributed the series to a single killer, known as "Jack the Ripper".

=== Leather Apron ===
Local rumours that a Jewish man known as "Leather Apron" might have been responsible for the murders were investigated by the police. He was reputed to carry a knife and was said to have frequently intimidated local prostitutes. Imaginative descriptions of "Leather Apron", often employing crude antisemitic stereotypes, appeared widely in the press in the days following Nichols's murder, although some London newspapers dismissed the theory as "a mythical outgrowth of the reporter's fancy".

John Pizer, a Polish Jew who made footwear from leather, was known locally by the name "Leather Apron". Despite there being no direct evidence against him, (Note: A Metropolitan Police report dated 7 September had confirmed that there was "no evidence" against the individual known as Leather Apron.) he was arrested by Sergeant William Thicke on 10 September. Although Pizer denied being known by this nickname, Thicke was aware of his reputation and that he was commonly referred to by this name. A search of Pizer's home uncovered five long-bladed knives. Nevertheless, Pizer was soon released after his alibis for the nights of the two most recent Whitechapel murders were confirmed.

Pizer later successfully obtained monetary compensation from at least one newspaper that had named him as the murderer.

== Funeral ==
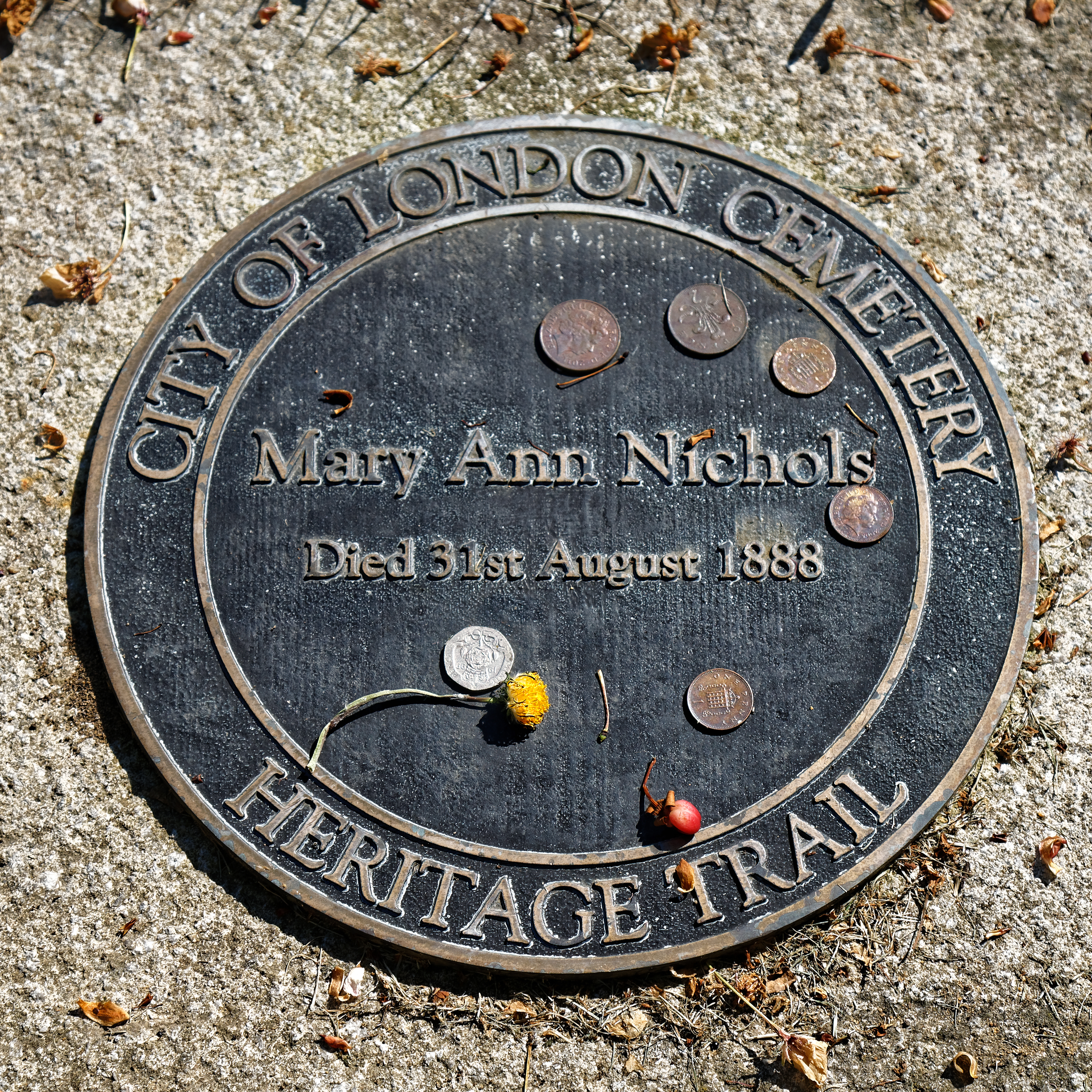
Nichols's grave marker at the City of London Cemetery

Nichols was buried on the afternoon of 6 September 1888. She was laid to rest in the City of London Cemetery, situated in the east London district of Manor Park. Her body was conveyed to the cemetery in a hearse supplied by a Hanbury Street undertaker named Henry Smith. The funeral cortège comprised the hearse carrying her coffin and two mourning coaches, which transported her father, estranged husband, and three of her children. Several thousand people observed the cortège as it travelled from the mortuary to the cemetery.

Nichols's coffin was made of polished elm and bore a brass plaque inscribed, Mary Ann Nichols, aged 42; died August 31, 1888. (Note: While Nichols's death certificate states that she was 42 at the time of her murder (an error reflected on her coffin plate and gravestone), her birth record indicates she was 43, a fact earlier confirmed at Nichols's inquest by her father, who described his daughter as looking "ten years younger" than her age.) She was interred in a public grave numbered 210752, located on the edge of what is now the cemetery's Memorial Garden.

In late 1996, the cemetery authorities formally marked Nichols's previously unmarked grave with a plaque.

== Media ==
=== Film ===
- A Study in Terror (1965). This film casts Christiane Maybach as Mary Ann Nichols.
- Love Lies Bleeding (1999). A drama film directed by William Tannen. Nichols is portrayed by Nancy Bishop in this film.
- From Hell (2001). Directed by the Hughes Brothers, the film casts Annabelle Apsion as Mary Ann Nichols.

=== Television ===
- The Real Jack the Ripper (2010). Directed by David Mortin, this series casts Stephne Haliburn as Mary Ann Nichols and was first broadcast on 31 August 2010.
- Jack the Ripper: The Definitive Story (2011). A two-hour documentary which references original police reports and eyewitness accounts pertaining to the Whitechapel Murderer. Nichols is portrayed by actress Lorayne Constance in this documentary.

=== Drama ===
- Jack, the Last Victim (2005). This musical casts Marissa Merewood as Mary Ann Nichols.

== See also ==
- Cold case
- List of serial killers before 1900
- Unsolved murders in the United Kingdom
