= Geoffrey Rose (actor) =

English actor and thriller writer (1932–c. 2026)

Geoffrey Rose (1932–c. 2026) was an English actor and thriller writer. Born in London, he was raised in Cheshire and Kent. After leaving school, he studied at an acting academy and subsequently was a professional actor for nearly five decades. He wrote three thrillers in the mid-1970s, all of which received praise from critics. These are: Nobody On the Road (1972), A Clear Road to Archangel (1973), and The Bright Adventure (1975).

Possibly his best known acting role was as Arthur Ashton, the headmaster who married Jessie Seaton, in When the Boat Comes In. He played Pinch in the BBC Television Shakespeare production of The Comedy of Errors, Deverill in the Haunting of Cassie Palmer and Dr. George Bagster Phillips in Jack the Ripper.

Rose's death was announced in the Autumn/Winter 2026 edition of Equity magazine.
