= Annie Chapman =

Whitechapel murder victim (1840–1888)

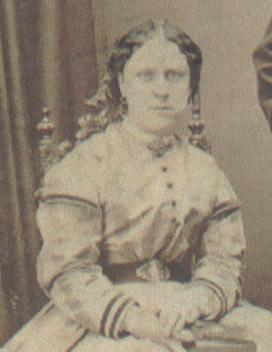
- Chapman on her wedding day in 1869
- Born: Eliza Anne Smith; 25 September 1840; Paddington, London, England
- Died: 8 September 1888 (aged 47); Spitalfields, London, England
- Cause of death: Blood loss due to severance of the carotid vessels
- Body discovered: 29 Hanbury Street, Spitalfields, London; 51°31′13.35″N 0°4′21.20″W
- Resting place: Manor Park Cemetery and Crematorium, Forest Gate, London, England; 51.552354°N 0.043065°E (memorial plaque)
- Known for: Victim of serial murder
- Spouse: John Chapman (m. 1869; sep. 1884)
- Children: 3
- Parent(s): George Smith; Ruth Chapman

Annie Chapman (born Eliza Ann Smith; 25 September 1840 – 8 September 1888) was the second canonical victim of the unidentified serial killer known as "Jack the Ripper", who murdered and mutilated at least five women in the Whitechapel and Spitalfields districts of London between late August and early November 1888.

Although earlier murders attributed to the Ripper, then referred to as the "Whitechapel murderer", had already attracted considerable press and public attention, Chapman's killing provoked widespread alarm in the East End, and intensified pressure upon the police to apprehend the culprit.

== Early life ==
Chapman was born Eliza Ann Smith on 25 September 1840 in Paddington. She was the first of five children born to George Smith and Ruth Chapman. George was a soldier, having enlisted in the 2nd Regiment of Life Guards in December 1834. The family's movements during Annie's earliest years reportedly followed her father's military service in London and Windsor.

Annie's parents were not married at the time of her birth, although they married on 22 February 1842 in Paddington. Following the birth of their second child in 1844, the family relocated to Knightsbridge, where George Smith became a valet. They later moved to Berkshire in 1856.

According to her brother, Fountain, Annie had "first took a drink when she was quite young", quickly developing a weakness for alcohol. Although both he and two of her sisters had persuaded her to sign a pledge to refrain from drinking, she "was tempted and fell" despite their "over and over" efforts to dissuade her.

=== Family relocation ===
Census records from 1861 indicate that all members of the Smith family, except Annie, had relocated to the parish of Clewer. She is believed to have remained in London, possibly due to employment commitments as a domestic servant. Her father, George (also known as William Smith), was by this time the valet to Captain Thomas Naylor Leland of the Denbighshire Yeomanry Cavalry. On 13 June 1863, George accompanied his employer to a horse racing event. He lodged with his employer that evening at the Elephant and Castle, Wrexham. That night, George committed suicide.

Contemporary accounts describe Annie as an intelligent and sociable woman with a weakness for alcohol, particularly rum. An acquaintance told the inquest into her murder that she was "very civil and industrious when sober", before adding, "I have often seen her the worse for drink." She was 5 ft 0 in (1.52 m) in height and had blue eyes and wavy, dark brown hair, leading acquaintances to give her the nickname "Dark Annie".

== Marriage ==
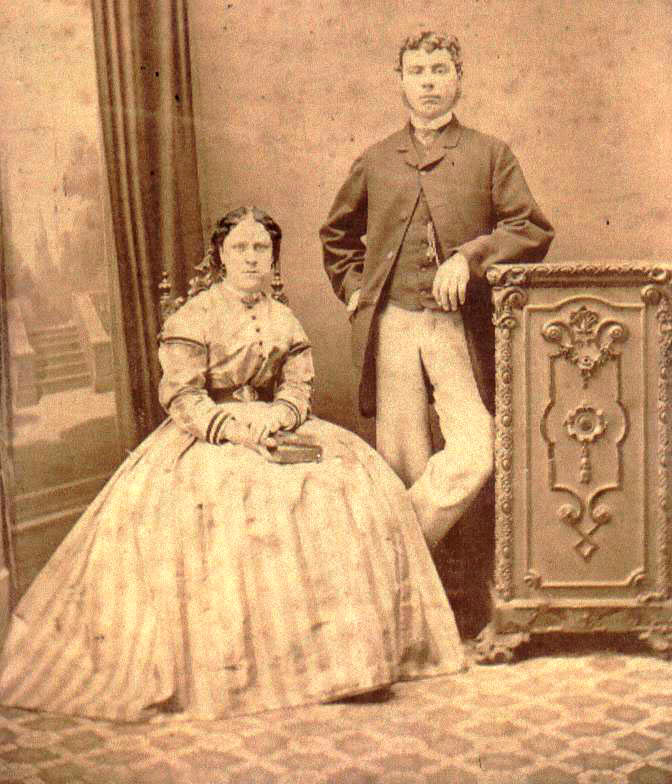
Wedding portrait of Annie and John Chapman, 1 May 1869

On 1 May 1869, Annie married John James Chapman, who was related to her mother. The ceremony was conducted at All Saints Church in the Knightsbridge district of London, and was witnessed by one of her sisters, Emily Laticia, and a colleague of her husband named George White. The couple's residence on their marriage certificate is listed as 29 Montpelier Place, Brompton, although they are believed to have briefly lived with White and his wife in Bayswater.

In the years following their marriage, the Chapmans lived at various addresses in West London. In the early 1870s, John obtained employment in the service of a nobleman in Bond Street.

=== Children ===
The couple had three children: Emily Ruth (b. 25 June 1870), Annie Georgina (b. 5 June 1873), and John Alfred (b. 21 November 1880). Emily Ruth was born at Chapman's mother's home in Montpelier Place, Knightsbridge; Annie Georgina was born at South Bruton Mews, Mayfair; and John Alfred was born in the Berkshire village of Bray. John was born crippled. The Chapmans sought medical help for him at a London hospital before later placing him in the care of an institution for the physically disabled near Windsor. (Note: Both Annie and John Chapman are believed to have occasionally visited their son at this institution.)

Although Annie had struggled with alcoholism as an adult, she had reportedly weaned herself off drink by 1880. Her son's disability is believed to have contributed to her gradual return to alcohol dependency.

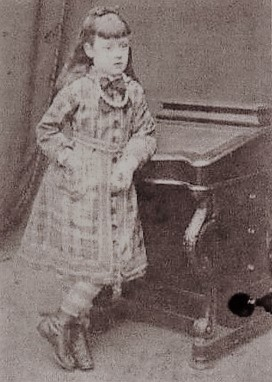
Emily Ruth Chapman. Her death on 21 November 1882 at age 12 increased her parents' alcohol dependency.

In 1881, the Chapman family relocated from West London to Windsor, where John took a job as a coachman to a farm bailiff named Josiah Weeks, and the family lived in the attic rooms of St. Leonard Hill Farm Cottage. The following year, Emily Ruth died of meningitis on her brother's second birthday, at the age of twelve.

Following their daughter's death, both Annie and her husband turned to heavy drinking. Over the next several years, she was arrested on several occasions for public intoxication in both Clewer and Windsor, although no records exist of her ever being brought before a magistrates court for these arrests.

== Separation ==
Annie and her husband separated by mutual consent in 1884. John retained custody of their surviving daughter, while Annie relocated to London. He was obliged to pay her a weekly allowance of ten shillings via Post Office Order. The precise reason for the couple's separation is unknown, although a later police report lists the reason for their separation as Annie's "drunken and immoral ways".

Two years later, in 1886, John resigned from his job due to his declining health and relocated to New Windsor. He died of liver cirrhosis and edema on 25 December, bringing an end to the weekly payments. Annie learned of her husband's death through her brother-in-law. Her surviving daughter, Annie Georgina (then aged thirteen), is believed either to have been placed in a French institution or to have joined a performing troupe that travelled with a circus in France. Census records from 1891 reveal both of Annie's surviving children were living with their grandmother in Knightsbridge.

=== Life in Whitechapel ===
Following her separation from her husband, Annie relocated to Whitechapel, primarily living on the weekly allowance of 10s he provided. Over the following years, she resided in common lodging-houses in both Whitechapel and Spitalfields. By 1886, she was living with a man who made wire sieves for a living, and consequently became known to some acquaintances as "Annie Sievey" or "Siffey". At the end of that year, her weekly allowance abruptly ceased. When she enquired why these weekly payments had stopped, Annie learned that her husband had died of alcohol-related causes.

Shortly after John's death, this sieve-maker left her, possibly due to the loss of her allowance, and relocated to Notting Hill. One of Annie's friends said she became depressed after this separation and appeared to lose her will to live.

== 1888 ==
By May or June 1888, Chapman was residing at Crossingham's Lodging House at 35 Dorset Street, paying 8d a night for a double bed. (Note: Chapman occupied bed No. 29 at Crossingham's Lodging House. Via an agreement with the lodging-house deputy, this bed was reserved for her each night.) According to the lodging-house deputy, Timothy Donovan, a 47-year-old bricklayer's labourer named Edward "The Pensioner" Stanley would typically stay with Chapman between Saturday and Monday, occasionally paying for her bed. (Note: Edward Stanley is known to have falsely claimed to be an army veteran in receipt of a pension, thus leading to this nickname.) She earned her income from crochet work, making antimacassars, and selling flowers, supplemented by casual prostitution.

Eight days before her death, Chapman fought with a fellow resident of Crossingham's Lodging House named Eliza Cooper. The two were reportedly rivals for the affections of a local hawker named Harry, although Cooper later claimed the dispute had begun when Chapman borrowed a bar of soap from her and, when asked to return it, threw a halfpenny onto a kitchen table, saying, "Go get a halfpenny's worth of soap." A later confrontation between the two at the Britannia Public House ended with Cooper striking Chapman in the face and chest, leaving her with a black eye and a bruised breast. (Note: A fellow lodger at Crossingham's Lodging House, Amelia Palmer, later informed police this fistfight had occurred at the lodging-house on 31 August and not at the Britannia Public House.)

On 7 September, Amelia Palmer encountered Chapman in Dorset Street. Palmer later told police that she appeared visibly pale, having been discharged from the casual ward of the Whitechapel Infirmary earlier that day. Chapman complained to Palmer that she felt "too ill to do anything".

After Chapman's death, the coroner who conducted her autopsy noted that her lungs and membranes of her brain were in an advanced state of disease, which would have proved fatal within months. (Note: Chapman is known to have complained of feeling unwell to the last known individual she spoke to before encountering her murderer, stating: "It's no use my giving way. I must pull myself together and go out and get some money, otherwise, I shall have no lodgings.")

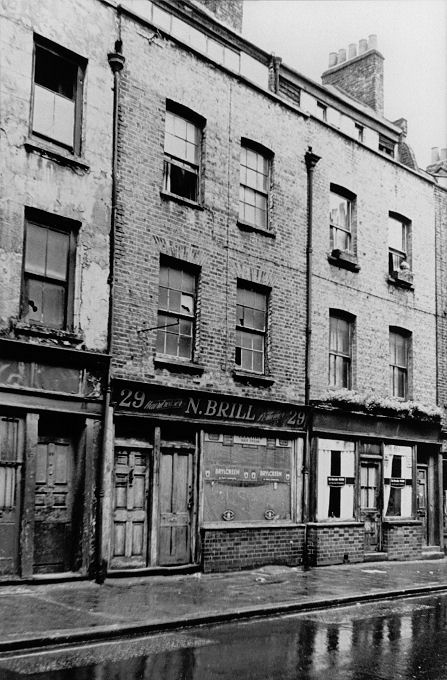
29 Hanbury Street (centre). The door through which Chapman and her murderer walked to the yard where her body was discovered is seen beneath the numerals of the property sign.

=== 8 September ===
According to both the lodging-house deputy, Timothy Donovan, and the watchman, John Evans, shortly after midnight on 8 September Chapman lacked the money required for her nightly lodging. She drank a pint of beer in the kitchen with fellow lodger Frederick Stevens at approximately 12:10 am and told another lodger that she had earlier visited her sister in Vauxhall, where her family had given her 5d. Stevens then observed her take a box of pills from her pocket. This box broke, and Chapman wrapped the pills in a piece of envelope taken from a mantlepiece before leaving the property. At approximately 1:35 am, she returned to the lodging-house with a baked potato which she ate before again leaving the premises, likely intending to earn the money needed for a bed through prostituting herself, saying, "I won't be long, Brummie. See that Tim keeps the bed for me." Evans last saw her walking in the direction of Spitalfields Market.

A Mrs Elizabeth Long testified at the subsequent inquest that she had seen Chapman speaking with a man at 5:30 am. The pair were standing just beyond the back yard of 29 Hanbury Street, Spitalfields. (Note: 29 Hanbury Street was a three-storey property occupied by 17 people, 16 of whom were present.) Long described the man as over 40 years old, slightly taller than Chapman, with dark hair, and of a foreign, "shabby-genteel" appearance. He wore a brown, low-crowned felt hat and possibly a dark coat. According to Long, the man asked Chapman, "Will you?" to which she replied, "Yes."

Long was certain of both Chapman's identity and the time of the sighting, having heard a nearby clock strike the half-hour just before she entered Hanbury Street. If her account was accurate, she was likely the last person to see Chapman alive, and in the company of her murderer.

== Murder ==
Shortly before 5:00 am on 8 September, John Richardson, the son of a resident of 29 Hanbury Street, entered the back yard of the property to check that the padlocked cellar remained secure and to trim a loose piece of leather from his boot. He confirmed the cellar was still padlocked, then sat on the rear steps to cut away the loose leather, noticing nothing unusual. Richardson left the property via the front door approximately three minutes later, having not ventured beyond the steps into the yard.

At approximately 5:15 am, Albert Cadosch, a tenant of 27 Hanbury Street, entered his back yard to use the lavatory. He later told police he heard a woman say, "No, no!" followed by the sound of something – or someone – falling against the fence dividing the yards of numbers 27 and 29 Hanbury Street. He did not investigate the noises.

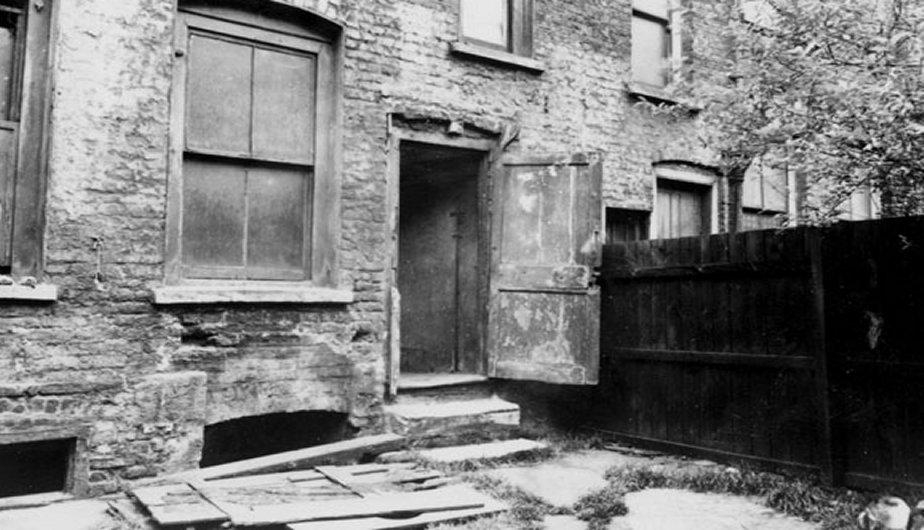
The entrance to the yard of 29 Hanbury Street. Chapman's body was found lying parallel to the fence, with her head almost touching the rear steps of this property, on 8 September 1888.

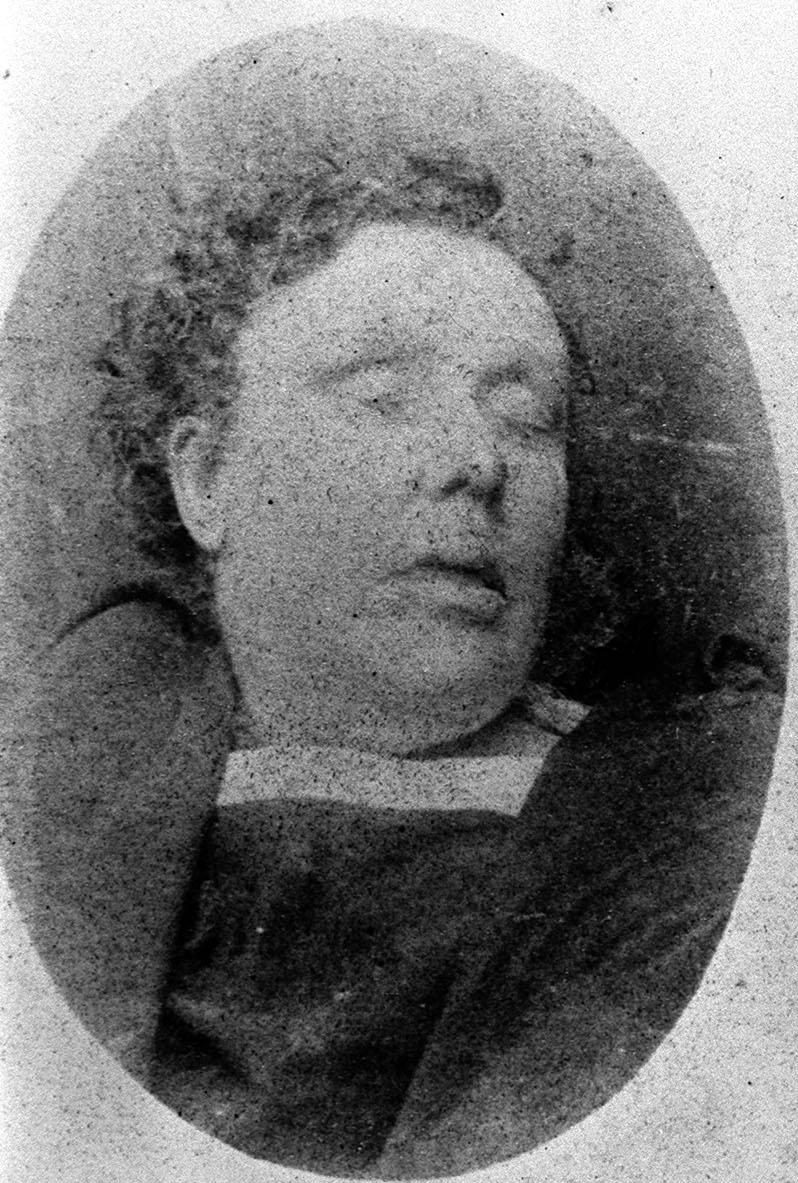
Mortuary photograph of Annie Chapman

Chapman's mutilated body was discovered shortly before 6:00 am by John Davis, an elderly resident of 29 Hanbury Street. Davis noticed that the front door was open, while the back door remained shut. Her body lay on the ground near the doorway to the back yard, with her head six inches (15 cm) from the steps to the property. He alerted three men – James Green, James Kent, and Henry Holland – before all three ran down Commercial Street to find a policeman, while Davis reported the discovery at the nearest police station.

At the corner of Hanbury Street, Green, Kent, and Holland encountered Divisional Inspector Joseph Luniss Chandler and told him, "Another woman has been murdered!" Chandler followed the men to the scene before requesting the assistance of police surgeon Dr George Bagster Phillips and additional officers. Several policemen arrived within minutes and were instructed to clear the passageway to the yard to ensure Phillips had access. Phillips reached Hanbury Street at approximately 6:30 am.

Phillips quickly established a definite link between Chapman's murder and that of Mary Ann Nichols, which had occurred on 31 August. (Note: Contemporary media publications such as The Illustrated Police News also linked Chapman's murder with two murders which had occurred within the Whitechapel district in 1888—those of Emma Elizabeth Smith and Martha Tabram.) Nichols had also suffered two deep slash wounds to the throat, inflicted from the left to right, followed by abdominal mutilation, and a blade of similar size and design had been used in both murders. Phillips also noted six areas of blood spattering on the wall between the steps and wooden palings dividing 27 and 29 Hanbury Street. Some of these spatterings were 18 inches (45 cm) above the ground.

Two pills, prescribed to Chapman, a torn piece of envelope, a small fragment of frayed coarse muslin, and a comb were recovered near her body. A leather apron, partially submerged in a dish of water near a tap, was also found close by.

Contemporary press reports claimed that two farthings were discovered in the yard near Chapman's body, although no reference to these coins appears in surviving police records. (Note: The vast majority of the City of London Police files relating to their investigation into the Whitechapel murders were destroyed in the Blitz.) Edmund Reid, the local inspector of H Division Whitechapel, was reported to have mentioned the coins at an inquest in 1889, and Major Henry Smith, acting Commissioner of the City Police, also referred to them in his memoirs. Smith's memoirs, written more than twenty years after the Whitechapel murders, are generally regarded as unreliable and embellished for dramatic effect. (Note: Smith's memoirs also claimed medical students frequently polished farthings in order that they could deceive East End prostitutes into believing they were sovereigns, and as such, the presence of two farthings at the crime scene suggested the culprit may have been a medical student. However, the price to solicit the services of an East End prostitute was as little as 4d—much less than the value of a sovereign.)

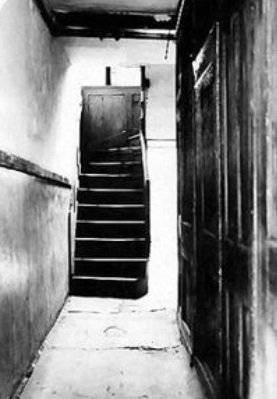
The passageway between the entrance and back yard of 29 Hanbury Street

== Inquest ==
The official inquest into Chapman's death opened at the Working Lad's Institute, Whitechapel, on 10 September. The inquest was presided over by the Middlesex coroner, Wynne Edwin Baxter. The first day heard testimony from four witnesses, including John Davies, who described discovering Chapman's body. Davies stated he had lived at Hanbury Street for two weeks and had never known the yard door to be locked. He added that anyone familiar with the latch on the front door could open it and gain access to the back yard. Also testifying were Timothy Donovan and John Evans, both of whom positively identified the deceased as Annie Chapman. Donovan further stated he had last seen her alive at approximately 1:50 am on 8 September, and that her final words to him were: "I have not sufficient money for my bed. Don't let it. I shan't be long before I am in."

=== Character testimony ===
Fellow Crossingham's Lodging House resident Amelia Palmer also testified on the first day. She stated she had known Chapman for several years and had often written letters on her behalf. Although Chapman had a fondness for alcohol, Palmer considered her a respectable woman who never used profane language. She added that Chapman had "not as a regular means of livelihood" sold sexual favours, and usually earned money through crochet work or by buying matches and flowers to sell for a small profit. According to Palmer, Chapman had only begun resorting to prostitution after her husband's death in December 1886. Every Friday, she would travel to Stratford to "sell anything she had". The lodging-house deputy, Timothy Donovan, testified that Chapman was generally on good terms with other lodgers, and that the quarrel and subsequent fight with Eliza Cooper on 31 August was the only incident of trouble involving her. He also stated that although Chapman typically drank to excess on Saturday nights, she was usually sober for the rest of the week.

=== Medical testimony ===
The third day of the inquest heard testimony from police officers who had attended the crime scene and those involved in the post-mortem. The evidence suggested Chapman may have been murdered as late as 5:30 am in the yard of Hanbury Street. Earlier testimony from several tenants of 29 Hanbury Street indicated that none had seen or heard anything suspicious at the time of the murder. On the second day, John Richardson testified that the passageway through the house to the back yard was never locked, as residents used it at all hours, and that the front door had been wide open when Chapman's body was discovered. He also stated he had frequently seen strangers – both men and women – loitering in the passageway. (Note: Albert Cadosch would testify as to what he had heard from 27 Hanbury Street at approximately 5:15 a.m. on the morning of Chapman's murder on the fourth day of the inquest.)

On 13 September, Dr George Bagster Phillips described the body as he observed it at 6:30 am in the back yard of 29 Hanbury Street:

The left arm was placed across the left breast. The legs were drawn up, the feet resting on the ground, and the knees turned outwards. The face was swollen and turned on the right side. The tongue protruded between the front teeth, but not beyond the lips. The tongue was evidently much swollen. The front teeth were perfect as far as the first molar, top and bottom and very fine teeth they were. The body was terribly mutilated ... the stiffness of the limbs was not marked but was evidently commencing. He noticed that the throat was dissevered deeply; that the incision through the skin were jagged and reached right round the neck ... On the wooden paling between the yard in question and the next, smears of blood, corresponding to where the head of the deceased lay, were to be seen. These were about 14 inches from the ground, and immediately above the part where the blood from the neck lay. ...

The instrument used at the throat and abdomen was the same. It must have been a very sharp knife with a thin narrow blade and must have been at least 6 to 8 inches in length, probably longer. He should say that the injuries could not have been inflicted by a bayonet or a sword bayonet. They could have been done by such an instrument as a medical man used for post-mortem purposes, but the ordinary surgical cases might not contain such an instrument. Those used by the slaughtermen, well ground down, might have caused them. He thought the knives used by those in the leather trade would not be long enough in the blade. There were indications of anatomical knowledge ... he should say that the deceased had been dead at least two hours, and probably more when he first saw her but it was right to mention that it was a fairly cool morning and that the body would be more apt to cool rapidly from its having lost a great quantity of blood. There was no evidence ... of a struggle having taken place. He was positive the deceased entered the yard alive ...

A handkerchief was round the throat of the deceased when he saw it early in the morning. He should say it was not tied on after the throat was cut.

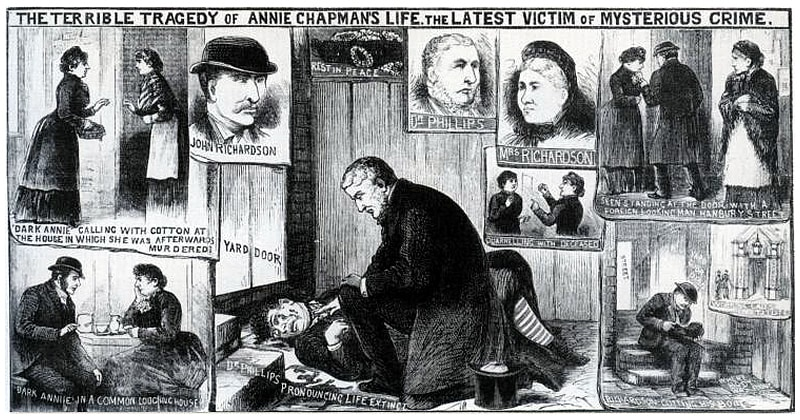
Illustrated Police News sketch of Dr George Bagster Phillips examining the body of Annie Chapman at 29 Hanbury Street

Chapman's throat had been cut from left to right with such force that striations were visible on the bones of her vertebral column, and she had been disembowelled, with one section of abdominal flesh placed on her left shoulder and another section, together with part of her small intestines, placed above her right shoulder. The post-mortem examination revealed that part of her uterus and bladder was missing. Chapman's protruding tongue and swollen face led Phillips to believe she may have been asphyxiated with the handkerchief around her neck before her throat was cut, and that her murderer had held her chin while inflicting the wound. As there was no blood trail leading into the yard, he was certain she had been killed where she was found.

Phillips concluded that Chapman suffered from a long-standing lung disease, that she was sober at the time of her death, and that she had not consumed alcohol for several hours beforehand. He believed the murderer must have possessed anatomical knowledge to remove her reproductive organs in a single movement with a blade about 6–8 inches (15–20 cm) long. Other medical experts dismissed the suggestion that the killer had surgical skill. As her body had not been examined extensively at the scene, it has also been suggested that the missing organ may have been removed by mortuary staff, who sometimes took advantage of bodies already opened to extract organs for sale as surgical specimens. In his summing up, coroner Baxter raised the possibility that Chapman had been murdered deliberately to obtain the uterus, citing enquiries made by an American at a London medical school regarding the purchase of such organs. The Lancet rejected Baxter's theory, criticising its "certain improbabilities and absurdities", and calling it "a grave error of judgement". The British Medical Journal was similarly dismissive, reporting that the physician who had requested the samples was a reputable doctor who had left the country eighteen months before the murder. Baxter subsequently abandoned the theory and never referred to it again. The Chicago Tribune claimed the American doctor was from Philadelphia, and author Philip Sugden later speculated that the man in question may have been Francis Tumblety.

Regarding the time of death, Phillips estimated that Chapman had died at or before 4:30 am, contradicting the testimony of Richardson, Long, and Cadosch, all of whom indicated the murder had occurred later. Victorian methods of estimating the time of death, such as assessing body temperature, were imprecise by modern standards, and Phillips himself acknowledged at the inquest that Chapman's body may have cooled more rapidly than expected.

== Conclusion ==
The inquest into Chapman's murder lasted five days, with the final session adjourned until 26 September. No further witnesses were called on that date, although coroner Baxter told the jury: "I have no doubt that if the perpetrator of this foul murder is eventually discovered, our efforts will not have been useless."

After a brief deliberation, the jury – having been instructed to consider precisely how, when, and by what means Chapman met her death – returned a verdict of wilful murder against a person or persons unknown.

== Investigation ==
On 15 September, Chief Inspector Donald Swanson of Scotland Yard was placed in overall command of the investigation into Chapman's murder. Swanson later reported that an "immediate and searching enquiry was made at all common lodging-houses to ascertain if anyone had entered [their premises] on the morning with blood on his hands or clothes, or under any suspicious circumstances".

=== Leather Apron ===
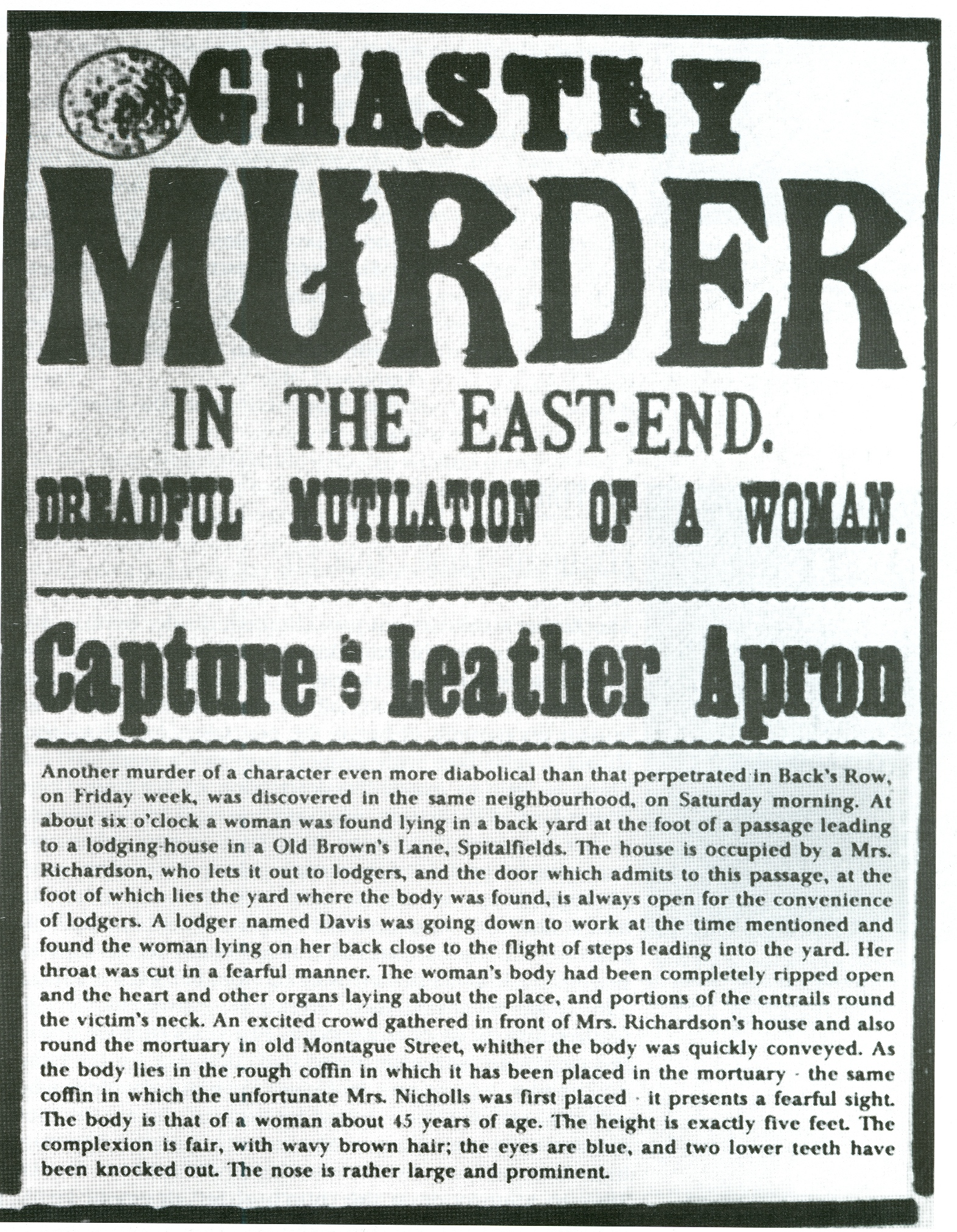
September 1888 newspaper broadsheet referring to the Whitechapel murderer as "Leather Apron"

A leather apron belonging to John Richardson lay beneath a tap in the yard of 29 Hanbury Street. His mother had placed it there after washing it on 6 September. Richardson was thoroughly investigated by the police but was eliminated from the enquiry. Nonetheless, press reports of the apron's discovery fuelled local rumours – first published in The Star on 4 September, following the murder of Mary Ann Nichols – that a Jew from the district known as "Leather Apron" was responsible for the Whitechapel murders.

Journalists, frustrated by the Criminal Investigation Department's reluctance to disclose details of their investigation to the public and eager to capitalise on growing public unrest, frequently resorted to reports of questionable accuracy. Imaginative descriptions of "Leather Apron", often employing crude Jewish stereotypes, appeared in the press. The Manchester Guardian reported: "Whatever information may be in the possession of the police they deem it necessary to keep secret ... It is believed their attention is particularly directed to ... a notorious character known as 'Leather Apron'." Rival journalists dismissed such accounts as "a mythical outgrowth of the reporter's fancy".

John Pizer, a 38-year-old Polish Jew who made footwear from leather, was known locally as "Leather Apron". He was reputed to have intimidated local prostitutes at knifepoint, and had appeared before the Thames Magistrates' Court on 4 August 1888, charged with indecent assault. Pizer is also believed to have stabbed a man in the hand in 1887.

Despite there being no direct evidence against him, Pizer was arrested on 10 September by Sergeant William Thicke. Although Pizer denied the allegation, Thicke was aware of his local reputation, and his "Leather Apron" nickname.

Pizer was released from custody on 11 September after police verified his alibis for the nights of the murders of both Chapman and Nichols. He was called as a witness on the second day of the inquest into Chapman's murder to publicly clear his name and dispel public suspicion that he was the killer. Pizer later obtained monetary compensation from at least one newspaper that had published several articles naming him as the prime suspect in the Whitechapel murders.

=== Pawnbrokers ===
Two brass rings – one flat, one oval – that Chapman was known to have worn were not recovered at the crime scene, either because she had pawned them or because they had been stolen, possibly by her murderer. Believing the killer might have removed the rings in order to pawn them, police searched all the pawnbrokers in Spitalfields and Whitechapel, but without success.

=== Edward Stanley ===
The section of a torn envelope recovered near Chapman's body, bearing the crest of the Royal Sussex Regiment and postmarked 'London, 28 August 1888', was briefly thought to be traceable to Edward Stanley, potentially placing him at the scene of the murder. Stanley was soon eliminated as a suspect as his alibis for the nights of the murders of both Nichols and Chapman were quickly confirmed. Between 6 August and 1 September, he was known to have been on active duty with the Hampshire Militia in Gosport, and on the night of Chapman's murder, eyewitnesses confirmed Stanley had been at his lodgings.

=== Further enquiries and arrests ===
In addition to John Pizer and Edward Stanley, police investigated or detained several other individuals during their enquiries into Chapman's murder, all of whom were released from custody. On 9 September, a 53-year-old ship's cook named William Henry Piggott was detained after arriving at a Gravesend pub with a recent hand injury and shouting misogynistic remarks. A blood-stained shirt he had left in a local fish shop was traced to him; Piggott claimed he had been bitten by a woman and that the blood was his own. He was investigated but soon released.

A Swiss butcher, Jacob Isenschmid, matched an eyewitness description given by a public house landlady, Mrs Fiddymont, who reported seeing a blood‑stained man acting suspiciously on the morning of Chapman's murder. Isenschmid had a distinctive appearance, including a large ginger moustache, and a known history of mental illness. He was arrested on 13 September on suspicion of the murder.

On 18 September, a 40-year-old German hairdresser named Charles Ludwig was arrested after attempting to stab a young man, Alexander Finlay, at a coffee stall while intoxicated. Ludwig was detained shortly afterwards in the company of a visibly distressed prostitute, who told a policeman, "Dear me! He frightened me very much when he pulled a big knife out." He was also wanted by the City of London Police for attempting to slash a woman's throat with a razor.

Both Isenschmid and Ludwig were ultimately cleared of suspicion after two further murders were committed on the same date while both men were in police custody. Isenschmid was later detained in a mental asylum. Other individuals named in contemporary police records and newspapers as possible suspects included a local trader, Friedrich Schumacher; pedlar Edward McKenna; apothecary and mental patient Oswald Puckridge; and an insane medical student John Sanders. No evidence exists against any of these individuals.

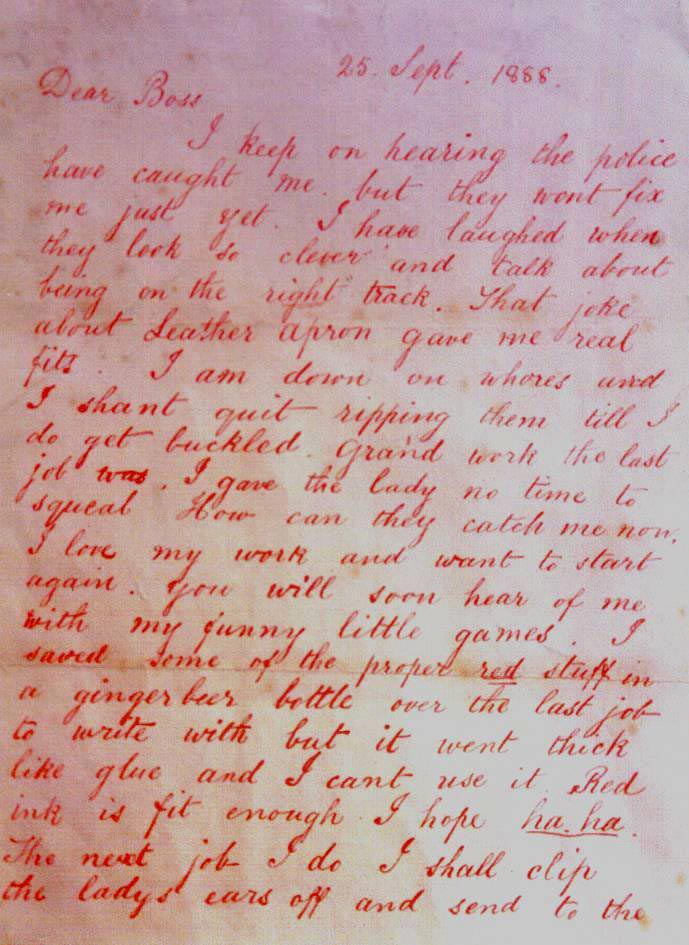
The "Dear Boss" letter addressed to the Central News Agency and received on 27 September

== Media moniker ==
On 27 September, the Central News Agency received the "Dear Boss" letter, written by an individual claiming to be the murderer. The author referred to the press having named him "Leather Apron", remarking, "That joke about Leather Apron gave me fits". He concluded the letter with the words "Yours truly, Jack the Ripper". This name quickly supplanted "Leather Apron" as the media's preferred moniker for the murderer.

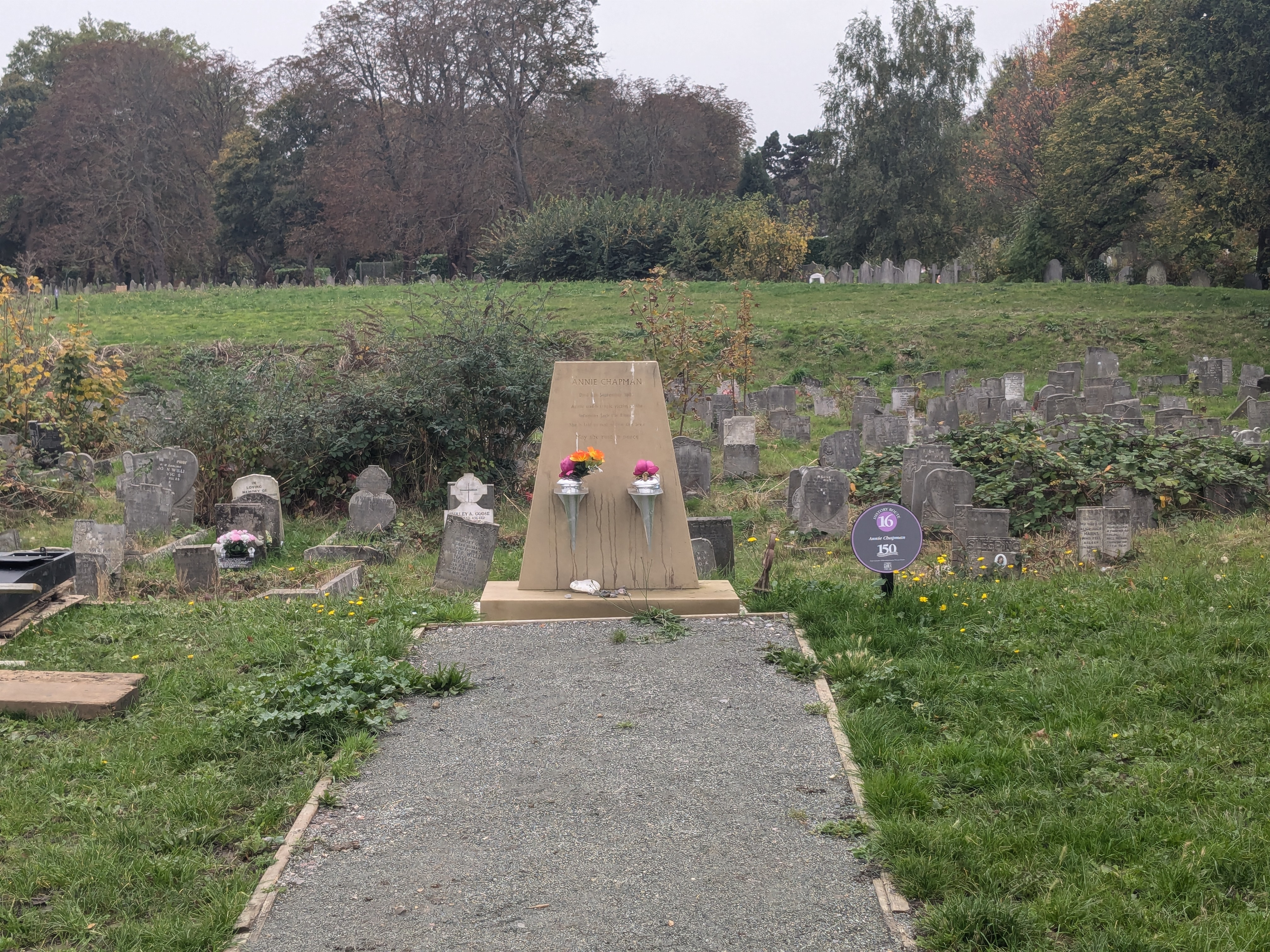
The headstone erected in Chapman's memory in Manor Park Cemetery

== Funeral ==
Chapman's body was moved from Hanbury Street to the mortuary in Montagu Street, Marylebone by Sergeant Edward Badham in a handcart large enough to hold a single coffin. This was similar to the cart previously used to transport the body of Mary Ann Nichols.

Chapman was buried shortly after 9:00 am on 14 September 1888 in a service paid for by her family. She was laid to rest in a communal grave in Manor Park Cemetery, Forest Gate, east London. At the family's request, the funeral was not publicised; no mourning coaches were used, and only the undertaker, police, and her relatives were aware of the arrangements. As a result, only family members and a small number of friends attended the service.

A hearse supplied by Hanbury Street undertaker Henry Smith travelled to the Whitechapel Mortuary in Montague Street at 7:00 am to collect Chapman's body. It was placed in an elm coffin draped in black and then taken to Spitalfields undertaker Harry Hawes, who arranged the funeral. By prior arrangement, Chapman's relatives and friends met the hearse outside the cemetery. She was buried in communal grave 78, square 148. Her coffin plate bore the inscription "Annie Chapman, died Sept. 8, 1888, aged 48 years."

The precise location of Chapman's grave within Manor Park Cemetery is now unknown. A plaque placed by the cemetery authorities in 2008 reads, "Her remains are buried within this area." A headstone was later erected nearby.

== Media ==
=== Film ===
- A Study in Terror (1965). This film casts Barbara Windsor as Annie Chapman.
- Love Lies Bleeding (1999). A drama film directed by William Tannen. Chapman is portrayed by Michaela Hans.
- From Hell. (2001). Directed by the Hughes Brothers, the film casts Katrin Cartlidge as Annie Chapman.

=== Television ===
- Jack the Ripper (1988). A Thames Television film drama series starring Michael Caine. Annie Chapman is played by actress Deirdre Costello.
- The Real Jack the Ripper (2010). Directed by David Mortin, this series casts Sharon Buhagiar as Annie Chapman and was first broadcast on 31 August 2010.
- Jack the Ripper: The Definitive Story (2011). A two-hour documentary which references original police reports and eyewitness accounts pertaining to the Whitechapel Murderer. Chapman is portrayed by Dianne Learmouth.

=== Drama ===
- Jack, the Last Victim (2005). This musical casts Michelle Jeffry as Annie Chapman.

== See also ==
- Cold case
- List of serial killers before 1900
- Unsolved murders in the United Kingdom
