= Durward Street =

Street in Whitechapel, London

Coordinates: 51.5203°N 0.0598°W

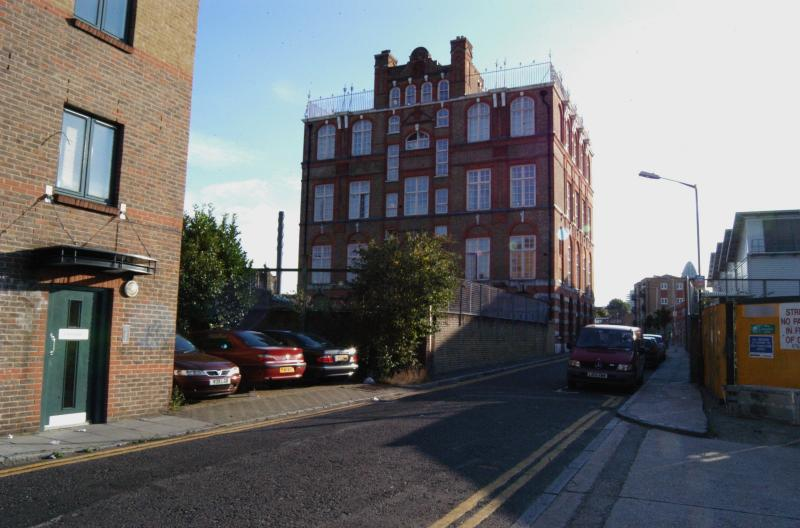
Durward Street, looking west, in 2006. Mary Ann Nichols's body was found approximately at the nearer end of the low brick wall. The Board School, extant in 1888, can be seen in the background.

Durward Street, formerly Buck's Row, is a street in Whitechapel, London.

In the early morning of 31 August 1888, the body of Mary Ann Nichols ("Polly") was found on the pavement on the south side of Buck's Row. She is generally thought to have been the first victim of Jack the Ripper. As the case attracted much unwanted attention to the street, its name was changed that same year to Durward Street.

The photograph shown here, taken in 2006, shows two features of Buck's Row that were present at the time of the murder. The tall building at the rear (west) is the former Buck's Row Board School, which can be seen in photographs of the street in 1888, now converted into residential flats and renamed "Trinity Hall". Extending east from it, along the south side of the street, is a low brick wall, also present in 1888. It was near the nearer corner of this wall that Polly Nichols's body was found.

During the construction of Crossrail, Durward Street has had a temporary entrance to the adjacent Whitechapel station and since 23 August 2021, the station opened a new permanent entrance onto Durward Street likely at the same site that Polly Nichols's body was found in 1888.
