= Wynne Edwin Baxter =

English academic and coroner (1844–1920)

Wynne Edwin Baxter

Wynne Edwin Baxter FRMS FGS (1 May 1844 – 1 October 1920) was an English intellectual and medical professional, variously working as a lawyer, translator, antiquarian, botanist, and coroner. He is best known for conducting the inquests on most of the victims of the Whitechapel Murders of 1888 to 1891, including three of the five canonical victims of Jack the Ripper in 1888. He was appointed governor of Royal London Hospital and conducted the inquest on Joseph Merrick, the "Elephant Man".

== Legal career ==
Baxter was the son of William Baxter, youngest of three sons of John Baxter (1781–1858), a Lewes printer and publisher, of "Baxter's Bible". His uncle George Baxter was the inventor of a method for colour printing. He attended Lewes Old Grammar School, and was educated privately by the Rev. Frost in Brighton. He studied Law and was admitted as a solicitor in 1867. Maintaining a link with printing, the family business, he was vice-president of the Provincial Newspaper Society between 1871 and 1877. He was appointed Junior Headborough for Lewes in 1868, Under-Sheriff of London and Middlesex from 1876 to 1879 and 1885 to 1886, Junior High Constable in 1878, and the last Senior High Constable in 1880. In 1881 Baxter became the first Mayor of Lewes. He acted as solicitor to Lewes Co-operative Benefit Building Society from 1870 until his death in 1920. He went on to become a member of the Law Society, the Law Association, and the Solicitor's Benevolent Association.

Baxter moved from Lewes to London in 1875, starting a solicitor's practice and an advertising agency at the same premises in Cannon Street. He maintained a legal practice at Lewes, which eventually would be run by his son, Reginald 'Reggie' Truscott Baxter. As the Coroner for Sussex from 1880 to 1887, Wynne Baxter conducted the inquest of the Brighton 'railway murderer' Percy Lefroy Mapleton who was hanged in 1881, as well as that of his victim, Isaac Frederick Gold.

By 1885 Baxter held two Deputy Coronerships in London, the City of London and Borough of Southwark. In December 1886 he won a bitterly fought contest to be elected the Coroner for the County of Middlesex (Eastern District); he was later appointed Coroner for the County of Middlesex (South Eastern District) from 1889 to 1891, and then for the City of London (Eastern District) and the Liberty of the Tower of London from 1892 until his death.

In July 1887 he held the inquest of Miriam Angel, who had been poisoned by Israel Lipski at 16, Batty Street. The name 'Lipski' was to become well known in Whitechapel in the next year, as was that of Baxter himself.

== Whitechapel Murders ==
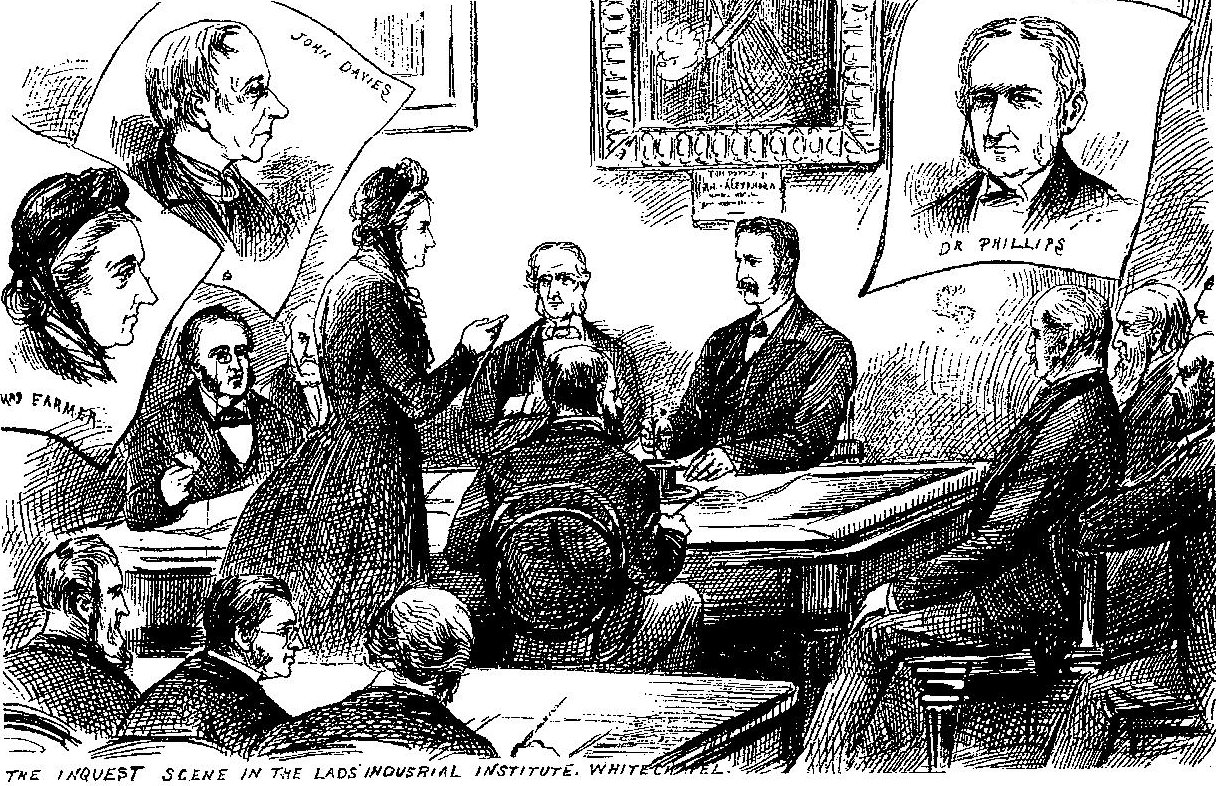
Coroner Wynne Baxter conducting the inquest into the murder of Annie Chapman at the Working Lads' Institute, Whitechapel Road

Baxter played a key judicial role during the Whitechapel Murders of 1888 to 1891, conducting the inquests into the deaths of Annie Millwood, Emma Elizabeth Smith, Polly Nichols, Annie Chapman, Elizabeth Stride, Rose Mylett, Alice McKenzie, the 'Pinchin Street Torso' and Frances Coles. The inquest for Mary Ann 'Polly' Nichols was conducted by Baxter on 1 September 1888 at the Working Lads' Institute in Whitechapel Road, and was attended by Detective Inspectors Frederick Abberline and Helson and Sergeants Godley and Enright on behalf of the Criminal Investigation Department (CID). Resumed on 3 and 17 September, Baxter heard testimony from numerous witnesses and gave examples of his blunt questioning style, such as this example reported in The Daily Telegraph of 4 September:

Baxter, to Henry Tomkins, horse slaughterer: Are there any women about there?

Tomkins: Oh! I know nothing about them, I don't like 'em.

Baxter: I did not ask you whether you like them; I ask you whether there were any about that night.

Baxter's own theory was that the murderer was attempting to obtain certain female organs for sale to doctors along with a medical periodical. Having heard medical evidence from Police Surgeon Dr George Bagster Phillips during the inquest into Annie Chapman's murder, Baxter said:

"The body had not been dissected, but the injuries had been made by someone who had considerable anatomical skill and knowledge. There were no meaningless cuts. The organ had been taken by one who knew where to find it, what difficulties he would have to contend against, and how he should use his knife so as to abstract the organ without injury to it....The conclusion that the desire was to possess the missing abdominal organ seemed overwhelming."

This theory was disproved soon after Baxter suggested it.

== Later life ==
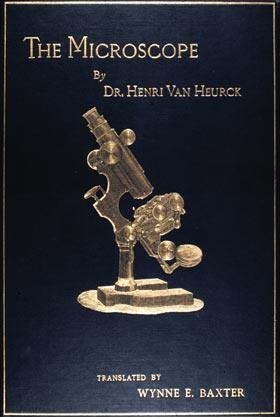
Baxter as translator (1893)

Appointed a Life Governor of the London Hospital in 1889, on 15 April 1890 he conducted the inquest into the death of the hospital's most famous resident, Joseph Carey Merrick, the 'Elephant Man', who had died on 11 April 1890. Wynne Edwin Baxter was the last High Constable of Lewes, and became the town's first Mayor in 1881.

The painting of Baxter as the first mayor of Lewes (as used at the top of this page), which hangs in the Assembly Room of Lewes Town Hall, is an interesting one. He is shown with the red mayor's gown, the mayoral chain, the mace and the chair. However, these items had to be made and he only had them for the last week of his mayoralty.

He was Clerk to the Lewes Provision Market, Governor of the Lewes Exhibition Fund, a member of the Committee of the Lewes National Schools, and a director of the Lewes Victoria Hospital.

Between November 1914 and April 1916, during the First World War, Baxter conducted inquests into the deaths of eleven German spies, including Karl Lody, who had been captured in Great Britain and tried and executed at the Tower of London. On 13 June 1917 the Germans launched the first daylight air raid over London. 17 Gotha G biplanes were flown from Belgium, dropping bombs on east London. 162 people were killed and a further 426 were injured during the raid, being the highest death toll from a single air raid on Britain during that war. On 15 June 1917 Baxter presided over the inquests of 20 of the victims at Poplar.

Baxter was a noted plant collector, a Fellow of the Geological Society of London and a Fellow and Treasurer of the Royal Microscopical Society. He was fluent in French, and, in the 1890s, translated a number of scientific books from that language into English. Baxter was also an antiquarian, having in his library 3,000 volumes concerning Paradise Lost author John Milton, many of them rare editions. He wrote and delivered academic papers on Milton. He was a member of the archaeological societies of Middlesex, Surrey, Kent, Sussex, and Gloucestershire. In addition, he was Clerk to two City Guilds, the Worshipful Company of Shipwrights and the Worshipful Company of Farriers. Moving to Stoke Newington he served as Chairman of the Public Library Committee, Chairman of the Licensing Bench, and Manager of Barn Street School. He was a prominent Freemason, being a member of the South Saxon Lodge No. 311.

In 1907 Baxter said "I have held over 30,000 inquests, and have not had one body exhumed yet".

Wynne Edwin Baxter died at his home at 170, Church Street, Stoke Newington, in 1920, at the age of 76. He has a memorial against the east wall of the churchyard of All Saints Church in Lewes.

== Legacy ==
Baxter's legal practice in Lewes exists today as Mayo Wynne Baxter LLP, which was formed in 2007 with the merger of Mayo & Perkins and Wynne Baxter. The firm has eight offices across Sussex employing about 250 staff. In 2005 the Brighton and Hove Bus Company named their number 657 bus 'Wynne Baxter'. The name on the bus was unveiled during the 'Jack the Ripper' Conference, which that year was held in Brighton.

== Publications ==
- The Domesday Book of Kent – A Return of Owners of Land 1873. By Wynne E Baxter (1877); based on data in the Return of Owners of Land, 1873 government survey.
- The Domesday Book for the County of Middlesex. By Wynne E. Baxter (Lewes: 1877).
- The Microscope: Its construction and management. By Dr. Henri Van Heurck, Professor of Botany and Director at the Antwerp Botanical Gardens. Translated by Wynne E. Baxter, FRMS, FGS. London, Crosby, Lockwood & Son, New York, D. Van Nostrand Co., (1893)
- A Treatise on the Diatomaceae by Henri van Heurck. Translated by Wynne E Baxter. Pub. W. Wesley & Son, London (1896)

== Media ==
In the 1988 TV mini-series Jack the Ripper, starring Michael Caine as Inspector Abberline, Baxter was played by veteran actor Harry Andrews.
