= Jacob Isenschmid =

Swiss murder suspect

- Born: 1845; Bern, Switzerland
- Died: Unknown
- Other names: "The Crazy Butcher"; Joseph Isenschmid
- Occupation: Butcher

Jacob Isenschmid, or Joseph Isenschmid (as mentioned in some sources), baptized by some newspapers of his time with the pseudonym "The Crazy Butcher", was a Swiss butcher who ended up being imprisoned for life in a British psychiatric hospital since September 1888. He was one of the contemporary suspects for the identity of the unidentified serial killer known as Jack the Ripper. Eventually, Scotland Yard ruled him out as a suspect, because, while he was imprisoned, other crimes attributed to the killer occurred.

== The insane killer theory ==
The succession of murders in the autumn of 1888 in London's East End, and inefficient verification of the authorities in charge of capturing the perpetrator, led the press and ordinary people to make up various hypotheses. One of the most vogue theories argued that an unbalanced psychopath was behind the gruesome killings and subsequent mutilations.

The police of the time, much like the public opinion, was reluctant to accept that the monstrosities committed of such caliber could've been consummated by a person of sound judgment. Certainly, it couldn't have been a cultured or intelligent individual, but rather an ignorant brute. Better yet: a psychopath affected by venereal diseases or alcoholism. A xenophobic panic led citizens to believe that no Englishman could've been the culprit.

Therefore, in the collective imagination, only one crazed man - who was also of foreign origin - represented the perfect candidate to be the prostitutes' killer.

In this context, it led to the arrest, hospitalization and subsequent suspicion, which fell upon the unfortunate Jacob Isenschmid.

== Links with Jack the Ripper ==
On 13 September 1888 London police arrested a man at his home in Milford Road, in the Holloway neighborhood. The arrested man was a butcher; that is to say, one who sold pieces from sheep and cattle, seasoned for use in refrigerators.

A couple of days prior on 11 September, two Whitechapel doctors had denounced him because of his strange habits, suggesting he could be the killer who operated in the region. In the first attempted arrest, authorities were greeted by Isenschmid's spouse, since he was not present at the time.

The complaint of the doctors would result in the suspect's own wife's statements. The woman alleged that two months previously her husband had left their home, and only returned sporadically without any notice. She stressed that he had a violent and ungovernable character, and used to carry large and sharp knives on him - even when it did not require practise of his trade. She also claimed that he had threatened to kill her once.

Apparently, the butcher had normal behavior until the previous year, when the failure of his business plunged him into serious depression. The following year, still in that state, he would become aggressive, committing wild attacks against women in the area.

It was learned that Isenschmid had undergone prolonged hospitalization suffering from severe psychiatric disorders. A new medical review found him completely demented, and examining forensics diagnosed him as dangerously insane. After his arrest, the justice ordered that he be imprisoned in a mental institution, and was referred to the hospital on Fairfield Road.

As soon as his arrest reached the ears of the press, the version that, without a doubt, the prisoner was the fierce criminal, and that the savage mutilations inflicted on the bodies were due to his mental disorders.

With sensational headlines, the newspapers reported on the apprehension of the offender who was nicknamed "The Whitechapel Killer" at that time, and made sure that the killer of the prostitutes was none other than "The Crazy Butcher".

However, the falsity of such accusations would soon be exposed, given that the suspect was imprisoned when the murders of Elizabeth Stride and Catherine Eddowes occurred, in the early hours of 30 September 1888; then he was definitely ruled out as the serial killer.

== See also ==
- Jack the Ripper suspects
