= Hanbury Street =

Street in London

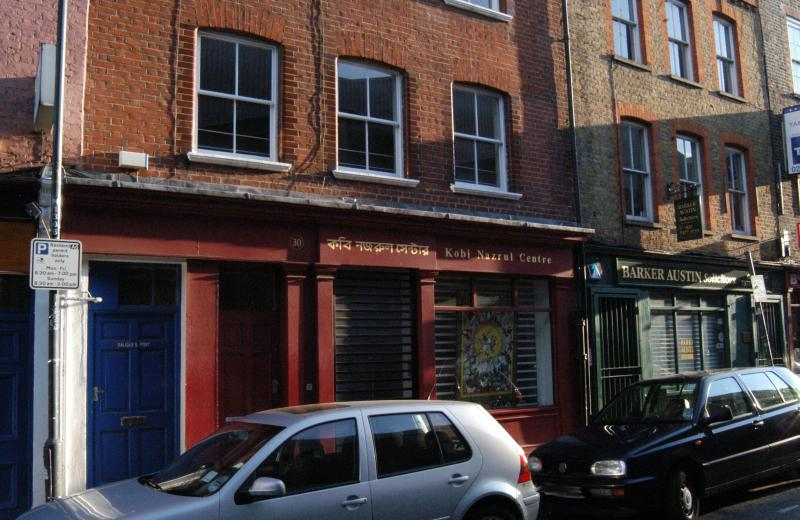
- South side of Hanbury Street, showing 28 and 30
- Interactive map of Hanbury Street
- Former name: Browne's Lane
- Length: 0.5 mi (0.80 km)
- Location: Tower Hamlets
- Postal code: E1
- Nearest train station: Whitechapel
- west end: A1202; 51.5203°N 0.0744°W
- east end: Old Montague Street; 51.5197°N 0.0639°W

Hanbury Street is a street running from Commercial Street in Spitalfields to Old Montague Street in Whitechapel located in the London Borough of Tower Hamlets. The eastern section is restricted to pedal cycles and pedestrians only.

== History ==
The street was laid out in the seventeenth century, and was originally known as Browne's Lane after the original developer. Its present name is derived from that of a local family who owned land there in the seventeenth century.

In 1884, Florence Eleanor Soper, the daughter-in-law of General William Booth of The Salvation Army, inaugurated The Women's Social Work, which was run from a small house in Hanbury Street. This home for women was set up in the hopes that they would not have to turn to prostitution and provided a safe haven for those who were already suffering from the trade.

On 8 September 1888, the body of Annie Chapman was found in the backyard of 29 Hanbury Street. Chapman is generally held to have been the second victim of Jack the Ripper. Today, buildings with shops below and flats above can still be found on the south side of Hanbury Street, across from the murder site. But 29, which was on the north side of the street, no longer exists, having been demolished. The Old Truman Brewery was extended to cover the entire block on the north side of Hanbury Street; since 2004 this has been the site of Sunday (Up)Market.

British entertainer Bud Flanagan was born at 12 Hanbury Street in 1896.

Neo-Nazi militant David Copeland attempted to detonate a nail-bomb upon Hanbury Street on Saturday 24 April 1999. Copeland intended to place the bomb on adjoining Brick Lane during its weekly market held on Sundays, but mistakenly planted the bomb on a Saturday when the road was less busy. After realising his mistake and unwilling to change the timer on the bomb, he left it on Hanbury Street instead. At 5:45 p.m. a member of the public found the bag and took it to Brick Lane police station which was closed, and then put it into his car boot, driving along Brick Lane. On realising it could have been a bomb he left the car at the junction with Fashion Street and called police, at which time the device exploded injuring six people and destroying two vehicles.

== Gallery ==
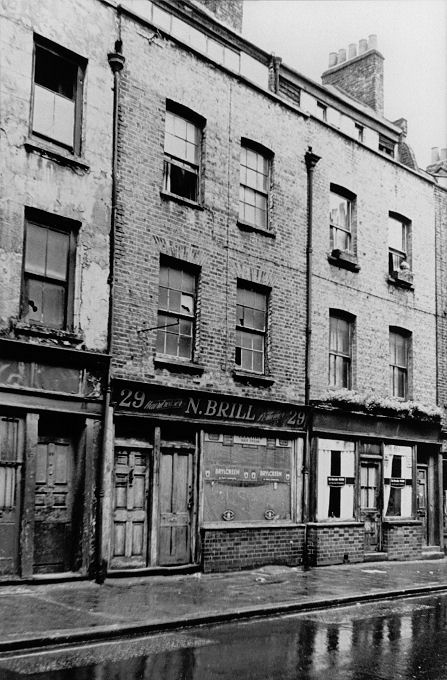
29 Hanbury Street (centre), as photographed in 1967. Jack the Ripper's second canonical victim was murdered at this location.

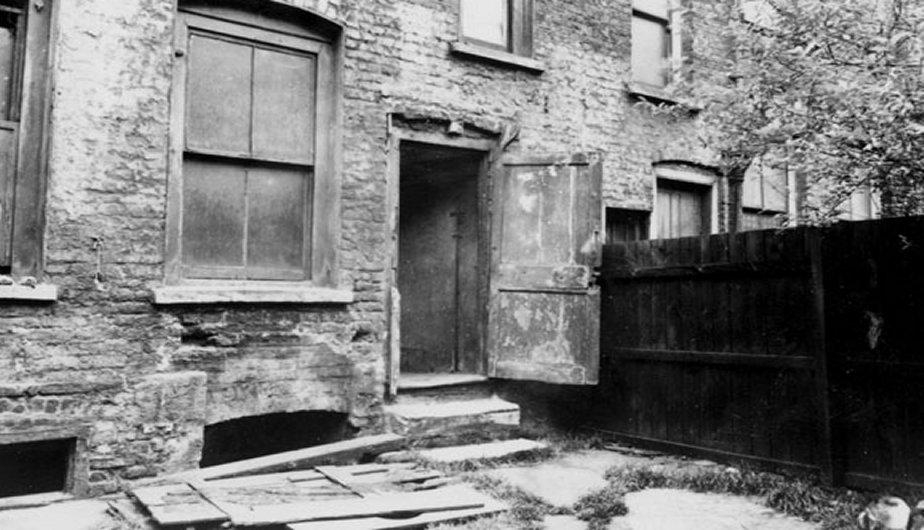
The rear yard of 29 Hanbury Street. Annie Chapman was murdered at this location in 1888.

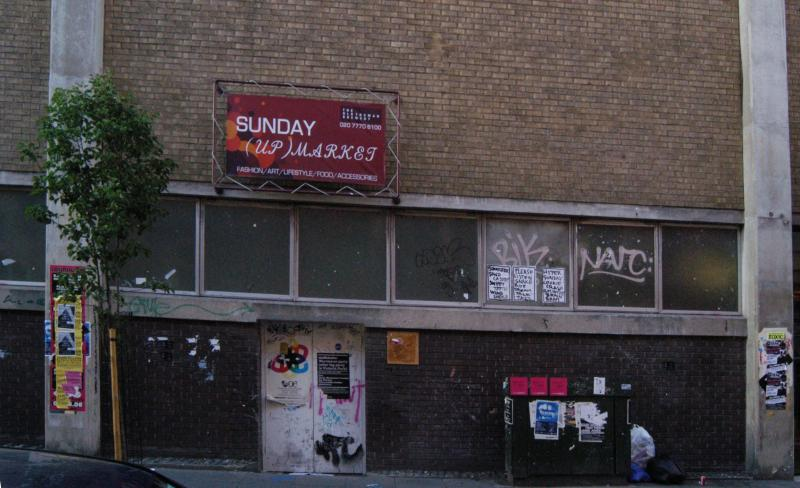
North side of Hanbury Street, depicting the former location of 29. This building covers the actual site of the murder of Annie Chapman.

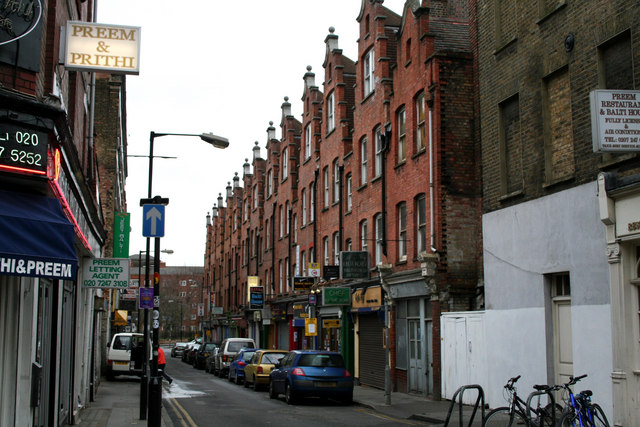
Hanbury Street, seen here in 2007

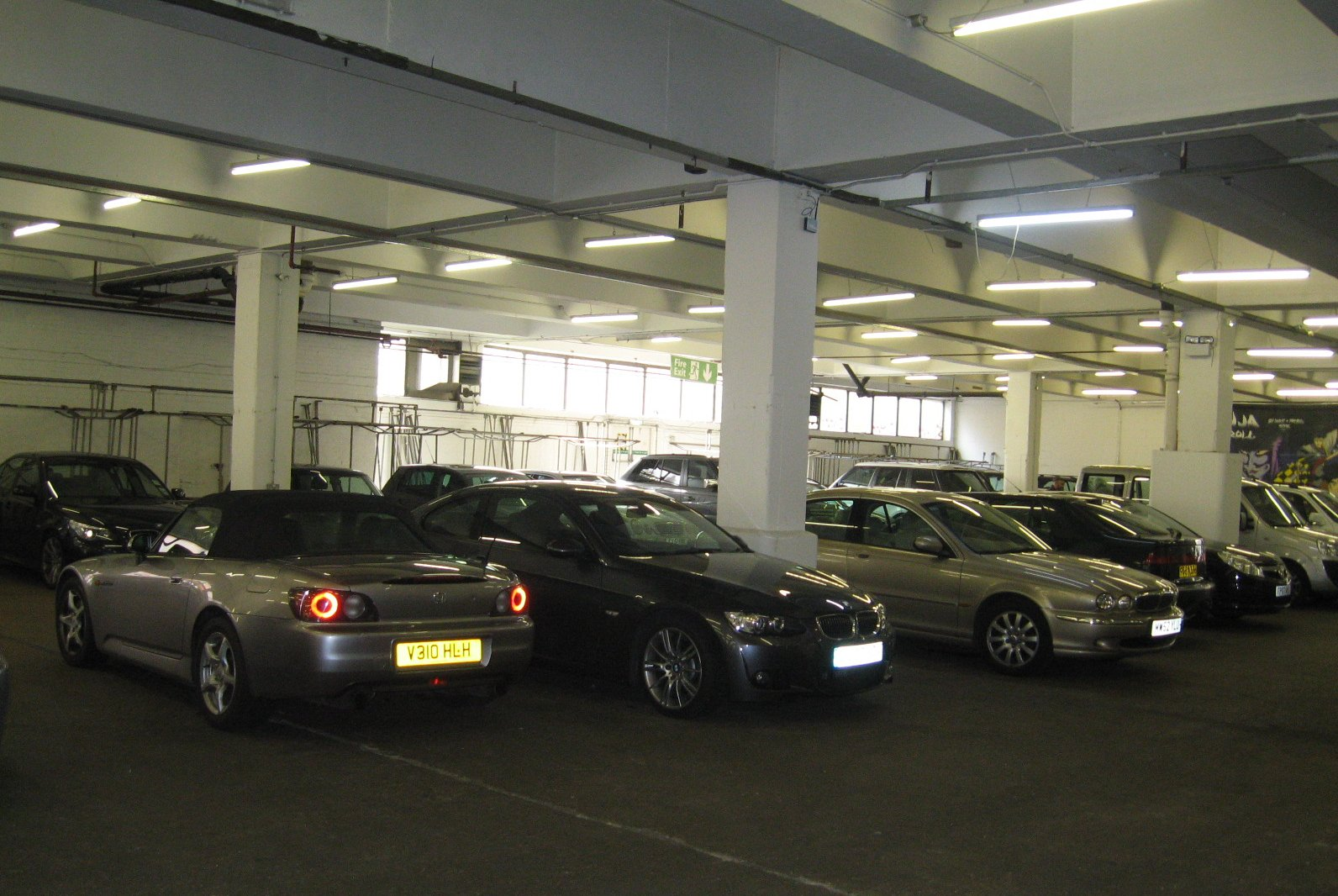
The car park now covering the location of 29 Hanbury Street

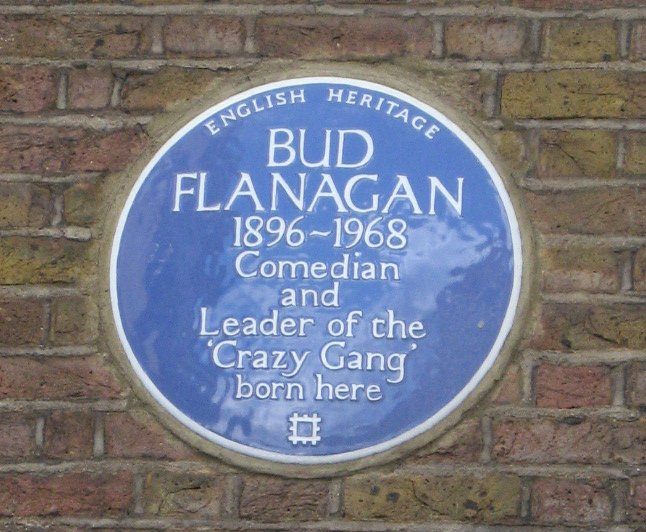
Bud Flanagan's English Heritage blue plaque on 12 Hanbury Street
