= Goulston Street graffito =

Contested evidence linked to the Whitechapel Murders

Coordinates: 51°30′59.51″N 0°4′30.14″W

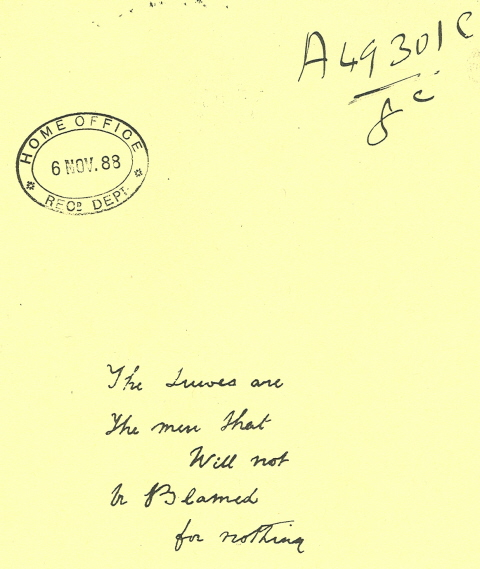
Copy of graffito in Goulston Street, attached to Metropolitan Police Commissioner Sir Charles Warren's report to the Home Office on the Whitechapel murders.

The Goulston Street graffito was a sentence written on a wall beside a clue in the 1888 Whitechapel murders investigation. It has been transcribed as variations on the sentence "The Juwes are the men that will not be blamed for nothing". The meaning of the graffito, and its possible connection to the crimes attributed to Jack the Ripper, have been debated for over a century.

== Discovery ==
The Whitechapel murders were a series of brutal attacks on women in the Whitechapel district in the East End of London that occurred between 1888 and 1891. Five of the murders are generally attributed to "Jack the Ripper", whose identity remains unknown, while the perpetrator(s) of the remaining six cannot be verified or are disputed.

After the murders of Elizabeth Stride and Catherine Eddowes in the early morning hours of 30 September 1888, police searched the area near the crime scenes in an effort to locate a suspect, witnesses or evidence. At about 3:00 a.m., Constable Alfred Long of the Metropolitan Police Force discovered a dirty, bloodstained piece of an apron in the stairwell of a tenement, 108 to 119 Model dwellings, Goulston Street, Whitechapel.

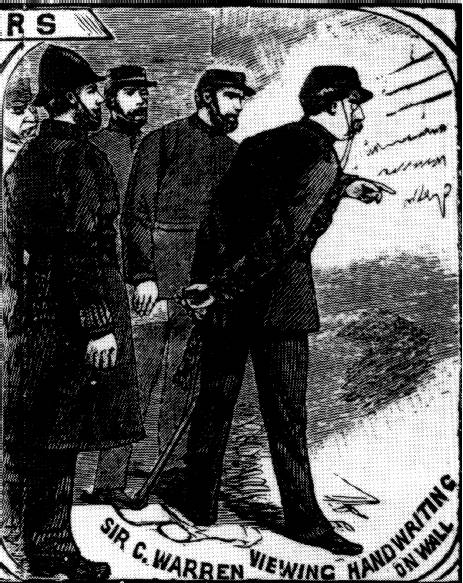
Illustration of Sir Charles Warren inspecting the Goulston Street graffito. Published in The Illustrated Police News 20 October 1888

The cloth was later confirmed as being a part of the apron worn by Catherine Eddowes. Above it, there was writing in white chalk on either the wall or the black brick jamb of the entranceway.

== Versions ==
Long told an inquest that it read, "The Juwes [sic] are the men that will not be blamed for nothing." Superintendent Arnold wrote a report which agrees with his account. Detective Constable Daniel Halse of the City of London Police, arrived a short time later, and took down a different version: "The Juwes are not the men who will be blamed for nothing." A third version, "The Juws [sic] are not the men To be blamed for nothing", was recorded by City surveyor, Frederick William Foster. A copy according with Long's version of the message was attached to a report from Metropolitan Police Commissioner Sir Charles Warren to the Home Office. A summary report on the writing by Chief Inspector Swanson rendered it as "The Jewes [sic] are not the men to be blamed for nothing." However, it is uncertain if Swanson ever saw the writing.

== Removal ==
Since the murder of Mary Ann Nichols on 31 August 1888, rumours had been circulating that the killings were the work of a Jew dubbed "Leather Apron", which had resulted in antisemitic demonstrations. One Jew, John Pizer, who had a reputation for violence against prostitutes and was nicknamed "Leather Apron" from his trade as a bootmaker, was arrested but released after his alibis for the murders were corroborated.

Police Superintendent Thomas Arnold visited the scene and saw the writing. Later, in his report of 6 November to the Home Office, he claimed, that with the strong feeling against the Jews that already existed, the message might have become the means of causing a riot:

I beg to report that on the morning of the 30th Sept. last, my attention was called to some writing on the wall of the entrance to some dwellings at No. 108 Goulston Street, Whitechapel which consisted of the following words: "The Juews are not [the word 'not' being deleted] the men that will not be blamed for nothing", and knowing in consequence of suspicion having fallen upon a Jew named 'John Pizer' alias 'Leather Apron' having committed a murder in Hanbury Street a short time previously, a strong feeling existed against the Jews generally, and as the Building upon which the writing was found was situated in the midst of a locality inhabited principally by that Sect, I was apprehensive that if the writing were left it would be the means of causing a riot and therefore considered it desirable that it should be removed having in view the fact that it was in such a position that it would have been rubbed by persons passing in & out of the Building."

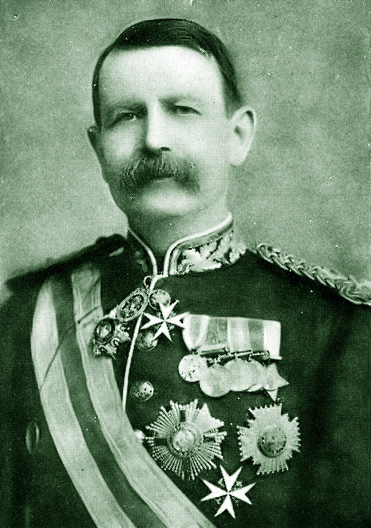
Police Commissioner Charles Warren

Religious tensions were already high, and there had already been many near-riots. Arnold ordered a man to be standing by with a sponge to erase the writing, while he consulted Commissioner Warren. Covering it in order to allow time for a photographer to arrive or removing a portion of it were considered, but Arnold and Warren (who personally attended the scene) considered this to be too dangerous, and Warren later stated he "considered it desirable to obliterate the writing at once".

== Investigation ==
While the Goulston Street graffito was found in Metropolitan Police territory, the apron piece was from a victim killed in the City of London, which has a separate police force. Some officers disagreed with Arnold and Warren's decision, especially those representing the City of London Police, who thought the writing constituted part of a crime scene and should at least be photographed before being erased, but it was wiped from the wall at 5:30 a.m.

According to the police officer supervising the Whitechapel murders investigation, the writing on the wall did not match the handwriting of the notorious "Dear Boss" letter, which claimed responsibility for the killings and used the signature "Jack the Ripper" (though it is widely thought that the letter was not written by the killer). Contemporary police concluded that the text was a semi-literate attack on the area's Jewish population.

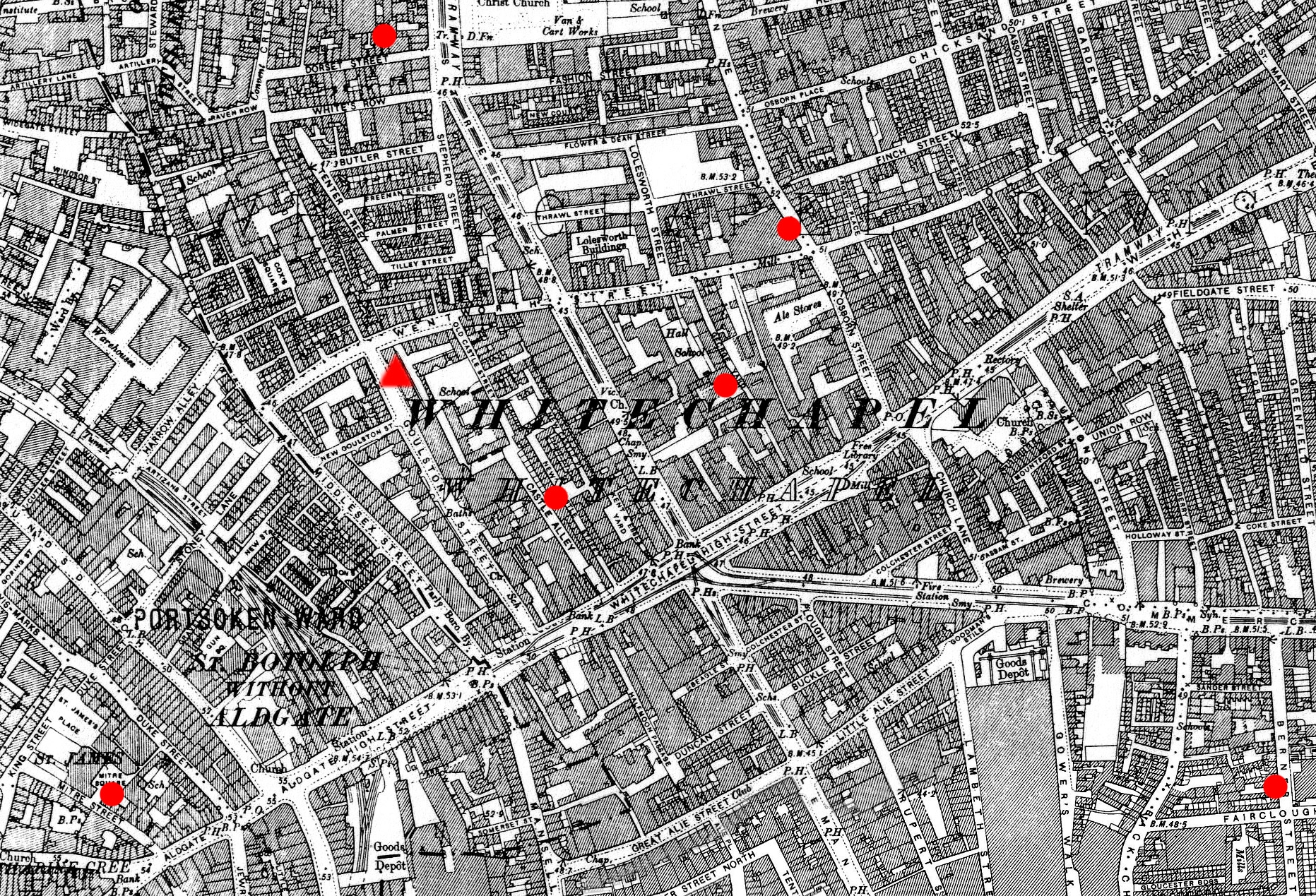
Map showing the location of the graffito (red triangle) in relation to 6 of the murder sites (red circles). Bottom left: Mitre Square (where Catherine Eddowes was found); Bottom right: Berner Street (where Elizabeth Stride was found). Others (clockwise from top): Dorset Street (Mary Jane Kelly), Osborn Street (Emma Elizabeth Smith), George Yard (Martha Tabram), Castle Alley (Alice McKenzie).

The police interviewed all the residents of 108–119 Goulston Street, but were unable to trace either the writer of the graffito or the murderer.

According to historian Philip Sugden there are at least three permissible interpretations of this particular clue: "All three are feasible, not one capable of proof." The first is that the writing was not the work of the murderer at all: the apron piece was dropped near the writing either incidentally or by design. The second would be to "take the murderer at his word"—a Jew incriminating himself and his people. The third interpretation was, according to Sugden, the one most favoured at the Scotland Yard and London Police: The chalk message was a deliberate subterfuge, designed to incriminate the Jews and throw the police off the track of the real murderer.

Walter Dew, a detective constable in Whitechapel, tended to think that the writing was irrelevant and unconnected to the murder, whereas Chief Inspector Henry Moore and Sir Robert Anderson, both from Scotland Yard, thought that the graffito was the work of the murderer.

== Interpretation ==
Author Martin Fido notes that the writing included a double negative, a common feature of Cockney speech. He suggests that the writing might be translated into standard English as "Jews will not take responsibility for anything" and that the message was written by someone who believed he or she had been wronged by one of the many Jewish merchants or tradesmen in the area. Historian Philip Sugden has said that the spelling of "Jews" as "Juwes" could reflect a local dialect on the part of the author of the graffito.

A contemporaneous explanation was offered by Robert D'Onston Stephenson, a journalist and writer supposedly interested in the occult and black magic. In an article (signed "One Who Thinks He Knows") in the Pall Mall Gazette of 1 December 1888, Stephenson concluded from the overall sentence construction, the double negative, the double definite article "the Juwes are the men", and the unusual misspelling that the Ripper was most probably French. Stephenson claimed that an "uneducated Englishman" or "ignorant Jew" was unlikely to misspell "Jew", whereas it was similar to the French juives. He excluded French-speaking Swiss and Belgians from his suspicions because "the idiosyncrasy of both those nationalities is adverse to this class of crime. On the contrary, in France, the murdering of prostitutes has long been practised, and has been considered to be almost peculiarly a French crime." This claim was disputed by a native French speaker in a letter to the editor of that same publication that ran on 6 December.

A still from Murder by Decree showing its depiction of the Goulston Street graffito. The film portrays "Juwes" as a Masonic term, and the original graffito was written in cursive script, not capitals.

Author Stephen Knight suggested that "Juwes" referred not to "Jews", but to Jubela, Jubelo and Jubelum, the three killers of Hiram Abiff, a semi-legendary figure in Freemasonry, and furthermore, that the message was written by the killer (or killers) as part of a Masonic plot. There is no evidence that anyone prior to Knight had ever referred to those three figures by the term "Juwes". Knight's suggestion was used in fictional treatments of the murders, such as the film Murder by Decree, and the graphic novel From Hell by Alan Moore and Eddie Campbell and the film of the same name starring Johnny Depp.

In addition to the confusion over the exact wording and meaning of the phrase, and whether it was written by the murderer or not, author Trevor Marriott raised another possibility: the piece of apron may not necessarily have been dropped by the murderer on his way back to the East End from Mitre Square. The victim herself might have used it as a sanitary towel, and dropped it on her way from the East End to Mitre Square. In Marriott's own words, it is an explanation that "many experts will regard as unbelievable".

== Inconclusive ==
To this day, there is no consensus on whether or not the graffito is relevant to the murders. Some modern researchers believe that the apron fragment's proximity to the graffito was coincidental and it was randomly discarded rather than being placed near it. Antisemitic graffiti was commonplace in Whitechapel at the time and, they say, that such behaviors as specific placement of evidence and taking the time to write a message while evading the police are inconsistent with most existing profiles of the killer. If, as some writers contend, the apron fragment was cut away by the murderer to use to wipe his hands, he could have discarded it near the body immediately after it had served that purpose, or he could have wiped his hands on it without needing to remove it.
