= Thomas Arnold (police officer) =

British policeman involved in investigating Jack the Ripper case

Thomas Arnold in 1888

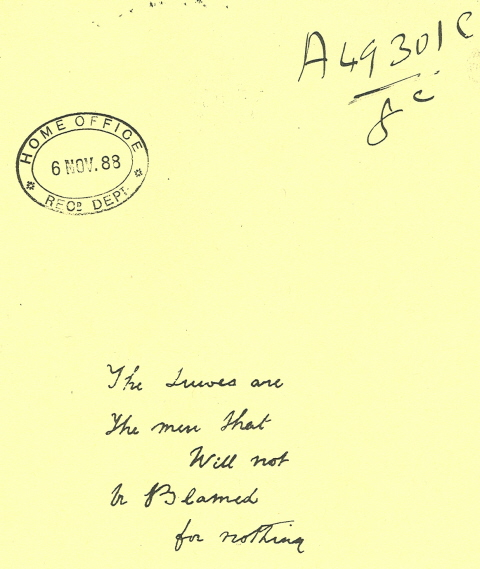
Copy of graffito in Goulston Street, attached to Metropolitan Police Commissioner Sir Charles Warren's report to the Home Office on the Whitechapel murders.

Police Superintendent Thomas Arnold (7 April 1835–1907) was a British policeman of the Victorian era best known for his involvement in the hunt for Jack the Ripper in 1888. It was his opinion that Mary Jane Kelly was not a victim of the Ripper.

The son of Thomas and Elizabeth Arnold, Arnold was born at Weald in Essex and joined the Metropolitan Police's B Division (Chelsea) on 19 March 1855 and resigned on 20 September 1855 to fight in the Crimean War. At the end of hostilities he rejoined the Police on 29 September 1856, being attached to K Division (West Ham) with the warrant number 35059. He served most of his career in London's East End. He was promoted to Inspector on 14 March 1866, and was transferred to B Division.

In 1887 Arnold was involved in the Lipski Case, and by 1888 he was Police Superintendent of H Division (Whitechapel) at the time of the Whitechapel murders in that district. After the "double event" of the early morning of 30 September 1888, police searched the areas near Mitre Square and Berner Street in an effort to locate a suspect, witnesses or evidence to the murders of Elizabeth Stride and Catherine Eddowes. At about 3:00 a.m., Constable Alfred Long discovered a bloodstained piece of cloth near a tenement building on Goulston Street. The cloth was later confirmed as having been cut from Eddowes' apron.

On the wall above where the apron was found was discovered graffiti written in chalk. P.C. Long reported the message as "The Juwes are the men That Will not be Blamed for nothing." Other police officers recalled the message slightly differently, as "The Juwes are not The men That Will be Blamed for nothing." Police Superintendent Thomas Arnold visited the scene and saw the graffiti. Believing that with daylight the message would be seen and increase the antisemitic feelings of the populace, Arnold ordered the graffito to be wiped off the wall. Ever since the murder of Mary Ann Nichols rumours had been current in the East End that the murders were the work of a Jew nicknamed "Leather Apron".

Although the Goulston Street graffito was found in Metropolitan Police territory, the apron was from a victim killed in the City of London, which had its own police force, the City of London Police. Some officers disagreed with Arnold's order, especially those from the City of London Police, who regarded the message as part of a crime scene which should at least be photographed before being erased. However, Arnold's order was upheld by Metropolitan Police Commissioner Sir Charles Warren, and the graffito was wiped from the wall at about 5:30 a.m.

Later, in his report of 6 November to the Home Office, Arnold claimed, that with the strong feeling against the Jews that already existed, the message might have become the means of causing a riot:

I beg to report that on the morning of the 30 September last my attention was called to some writing on the wall of the entrance to some dwellings No. 108 Goulston Street, Whitechapel which consisted of the following words: "The Juwes are the men that will not be blamed for nothing", and knowing in consequence of suspicion having fallen upon a Jew named 'John Pizer' alias 'Leather Apron' having committed a murder in Hanbury Street a short time previously, a strong feeling existed against the Jews generally, and as the Building upon which the writing was found was situated in the midst of a locality inhabited principally by that Sect, I was apprehensive that if the writing were left it would be the means of causing a riot and therefore considered it desirable that it should be removed having in view the fact that it was in such a position that it would have been rubbed by persons passing in & out of the Building."

In an interview with the Eastern Post in February 1893, Arnold said that "...not more than four of these murders were committed by the same hand. They were the murders of Annie Chapman in Hanbury Street, Mrs Nichols in Buck's Row, Elizabeth Stride in Berner Street and Mary Jane Kelly in Mitre Square." His confusion between Catherine Eddowes and Kelly means that it is not certain who Arnold is discounting but in reducing the number of Jack the Ripper victims to four he is contradicting Melville Macnaghten. However, Arnold was serving with Whitechapel's H Division during the Ripper murders, while Macnaghten did not join the Metropolitan Police until June 1889. Historian Andrew Cook wrote in his book Jack the Ripper: Case Closed that at his retirement dinner address in 1893 Arnold said that he never believed that Mary Jane Kelly was a Ripper victim.

On 1 February 1893 Arnold retired from the Police. He died in Leytonstone in January 1907.
