= Walter Simon Andrews =

British policeman

Walter Simon Andrews (27 April 1847 – 26 August 1899) was a British policeman. He was one of three inspectors (the other two being Frederick Abberline and Henry Moore) who were sent from Scotland Yard to Whitechapel in 1888 to strengthen the investigation of the Whitechapel murders.

He was born in Boulge, Suffolk, and married Jane Carr on 4 August 1867. He joined the London Metropolitan Police Service on 15 November 1869, and rose through the ranks. He was promoted to Detective Sergeant on 18 November 1875, and to Inspector on 6 July 1878.

In December 1888, he escorted a prisoner, Roland Gideon alias Israel Barnet, from London to Toronto, where Barnet was wanted for financial crimes. While in North America, Andrews was sent to New York City, perhaps to trace Francis Tumblety, a notorious charlatan who had fled to the United States after jumping bail in England on charges of gross indecency. The newspapers assumed, probably wrongly, that Tumblety was a suspect in the Whitechapel murders. The New York City Police, who had Tumblety under surveillance, said "there is no proof of his complicity in the Whitechapel murders, and the crime for which he is under bond in London is not extraditable". Andrews returned to London without securing an extradition.

Andrews retired in 1889. On 26 August 1899, at the age of 52, he committed suicide by hanging at Horndean, Hampshire.
