= James Thomas Sadler =

English sailor and murder suspect (d. after 1906)

- Born: 1837; Stepney, London, England
- Died: Unknown; possibly 1906 or 1910 (aged 68–73); England or South America
- Occupations: Sailor, stoker, machinist

James Thomas Sadler (c. 1837 – 1906 or 1910), also named Saddler in some sources, was an English merchant sailor who worked as both a machinist and stoker. In 1891, the then-53-year-old was accused of killing prostitute Frances Coles. Sadler was placed under arrest, and a mob almost lynched him at the exit of a police station. Eventually, he was dismissed by police for having a solid alibi, and obtained compensation from a newspaper that had branded him as Jack the Ripper.

== Sadler and the murder of Frances Coles ==
When the body of a 31-year-old woman was located at 5 o'clock in the morning of 13 February 1891, the police undertook an extensive search that concluded with the arrest of the victim's boyfriend. The woman's name was Frances Coles and she was a well-known prostitute. Her occasional companion turned out to be a much older man - James Thomas Sadler, a naval engineer and fireman.

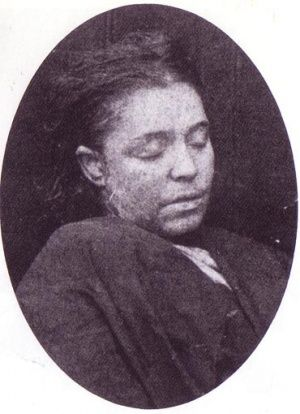
Frances Coles

His behaviour during the dawn of the crime made him a strong suspect. He had gone with her to the guest house where she lived, as seen by the landlord. The man appeared dishevelled. Sadler retired from the dwelling shortly after 1:30 in the morning and, moments later, Coles left alone on her way to the Shallow Gardens area, where she would later be found dying by the Metropolitan Police Officer Ernest William Thompson at approximately 2:15 a.m..

Sadler suddenly returned to the guest house, close to 3 o'clock in the morning, and he looked even more battered than on the previous occasion. Profuse blood stains were splashed on his clothes and he appeared very upset. He told the landlord that some ruffians assaulted him and stripped him of his gold watch. Despite his resistance, Sadler endured a hard beating and asked the landlord if he could spend the night there. However, the landlord was suspicious of the story and refused to accommodate Sadler, instead suggesting that he go to the London Hospital in Whitechapel to heal his wounds.

The following day, when the landlord learned that his tenant had been killed, he was convinced that it was Sadler. He contacted the authorities and reported him to the police, who quickly arrested him and drove to the police station located on Leman Street.

Word spread in the locality that the prisoner, in addition to being Coles's killer, was also the notorious Jack the Ripper. Soon, the commissioner of Leman Street was besieged by an angry crowd. For security reasons, the policemen took Sadler through a side door, but the mob noticed and attacked, shouting "Murderer!" with the intention of lynching Sadler. The policemen were forced to use their truncheons to save the detainee's life, who, apart from insults and threats, received several strikes to the face, leaving him bloodied.

== Judicial action and police investigation ==
When questioned, the prisoner admitted having accompanied the woman on the afternoon of 11 February 1891, the same day he had been fired from one of the boats where he worked. He said that he had met Frances 18 months before while on leave and, from then on, met her several more times. On the eve of the killing, 12 February, the couple spent their time drinking from tavern to tavern and, when they separated, she had bought a new hat and he was the victim of a robbery. Sadler insisted that he left Coles in the guest house around 2 o'clock in the morning, and never saw her again.

The acting judge ordered the suspect be held in Holloway Prison. Soon, very damaging circulations appeared against him, where his responsibility for the girl's death was taken for granted, and that, undoubtedly, he was Jack the Ripper. The smear campaign became so overblown that the British Home Secretary expressed his displeasure before Parliament about the newspapers, which sought to satisfy the public's thirst for sensationalism.

The prisoner, in turn, proclaimed his innocence constantly, and one of the newspapers picked up on his complaints: "What a blessing my case will be for the police!" - he exclaimed in an ironic argument; "They would solve all the unsolved crimes if they could only send me, no matter how innocent I am, to the gallows".

Harry Wilson, a lawyer hired by the firemen's guild to which the accused belonged, defended his client skilfully. He demonstrated the truthfulness of the street attack suffered that night, and succeeded in getting boat captains to provide testimony for the court. Finally, Sadler's cause was dismissed due to lack of evidence.

Police also investigated his movements during Jack the Ripper's killing spree. For example, it was found that from 16 July to 20, 1889, he was not in the area where Alice McKenzie was killed on 17 July, given that he worked until 20 July on the SS Fez, docked at Chatham Harbour. This excluded him as the woman's killer, and was further reinforced by witness Capt. Donald Cameron, whom Sadler worked for. This information is contained in the report from the CID of Scotland Yard, prepared on 3 March 1891 by Inspector Henry Moore and Superintendent Thomas Arnold. That report concluded by highlighting that after the exoneration of Sadler, there were no other prisoners charged with the killing of Frances Coles.

== Press accusations ==
Once the defendant was released, the media could no longer proclaim that he was guilty, but they did not cease invoking Jack the Ripper. For example, The Spectator said: "There is no doubt that no matter how long the suspicions are, Sadler did not kill the woman; and it is more than possible, probable, that the one who killed her was Jack the Ripper, the nickname that the people have given to the systematic assassin of Whitechapel prostitutes”.

It was also speculated - more by journalists than detectives - that witnesses to the crimes would have identified the fireman. As claimed by the Daily Telegraph, Joseph Lawende may have alluded to Sadler when he described the companion of Catherine Eddowes in Mitre Square during the early hours of 30 September 1888. It was also alleged that he could've been the subject surprised by Israel Schwartz prior to the murder of Elizabeth Stride. Nor was it ruled out that Chief Robert Anderson really accused him, and that he erroneously mentioned that the principal suspect was of Jewish origin.

The reporters did not leave the sailor alone, even after release. He was constantly asked if he had participated in the other murders, to which he replied that he had been falsely accused and was never present at the crime scenes. According to each case, he was either embarking or in a distant place from where the deaths occurred (note edited by the East London Observer on March 28, 1891). The journalist Joseph Hall Richardson of the Daily Telegraph reported on Sadler's identification attempt as guilt of the Ripper murders, in his memoir titled From the City to Fleet Street.

There, he recounted that when Frances Coles was killed, her lover's guilt was taken for granted by the press "too quickly", but the detectives had doubts about it and used Richardson himself and another reporter. They were asked to make inquiries in the Chatham Harbour - when they had already arrested Sadler - in order to get information from his wife or concubine. Journalists interviewed the sailor's wife, whom Richardson described as a "harpy that without measuring his words, betrayed the man".

Then, always following police instructions, the reporters conducted inquiries at the London Naval Trade Centre and the Offices of the Board of Trade, in order to verify whether or not at the time of the killings the sailor was on board. They examined records and checked the dates, and it was proven that each time there was a crime, the defendant "signed" on a vessel one or two days before the respective homicide.

Richardson would eventually end up sympathising and making friends with Sadler. He told the newspaper The Star (an adversary of the newspaper he worked for) that he falsely accused the man, and that Sadler filed and won a lawsuit against the media. To celebrate the success, a toast with plenty of drink was held in the offices of Richardson's newspaper. Sadler did not delay getting drunk, and when asked where he kept the money charged from The Star, he confided that it was kept under his cap. He was persuaded that it was better to keep the money inside the newspaper's safe for security reasons, to which he agreed. However, after a while, becoming more and more intoxicated, he became bellicose and demanded that his money be returned, claiming that he did not want to get scammed. On the next day, he went to his solicitor's office in order to give him the corresponding percentage of the received compensation. The curial at the time held a meeting with a person planning to smuggle arms into South America, taking advantage of the fact that two republics were at war. When the merchant learned that his other client was a sailor, he offered him a position, to which the lawyer advised Sadler not to take up as it was a "dangerous game". Sadler ignored the prudent advice, and, addressing the merchant, announced "I will make you a sailor, boss”. The next day, he left on the smuggler's ship bound for the Caribbean, this being the last true known fact about his whereabouts.

Despite the above, modern studies registered that two people named James Sadler died in England, in 1906 or 1910.

== See also ==
- Cold case
- Jack the Ripper
- Unsolved murders in the United Kingdom

== Cited works and further reading ==
- Begg, Paul (2003). Jack the Ripper: The Definitive History. London: Pearson Education. ISBN 978-1-317-86633-6
- Begg, Paul (2006). Jack the Ripper: The Facts. Anova Books. ISBN 1-86105-687-7
- Bell, Neil R. A. (2016). Capturing Jack the Ripper: In the Boots of a Bobby in Victorian England. Stroud: Amberley Publishing. ISBN 978-1-445-62162-3
- Cook, Andrew (2009). Jack the Ripper. Stroud, Gloucestershire: Amberley Publishing. ISBN 978-1-84868-327-3
- Eddleston, John J. (2002). Jack the Ripper: An Encyclopedia. London: Metro Books. ISBN 1-843-58046-2
- Edwards, Russell (2014). Naming Jack the Ripper: New Crime Scene Evidence, A Stunning Forensic Breakthrough. London: Sidgwick and Jackson. ISBN 978-0-283-07208-6
- Evans, Stewart P.; Rumbelow, Donald (2006). Jack the Ripper: Scotland Yard Investigates. Stroud, Gloucestershire: Sutton Publishing. ISBN 0-7509-4228-2
- Evans, Stewart P.; Skinner, Keith (2000). The Ultimate Jack the Ripper Sourcebook: An Illustrated Encyclopedia. London: Constable and Robinson. ISBN 1-84119-225-2
- Fido, Martin (1987). The Crimes, Death and Detection of Jack the Ripper. Vermont: Trafalgar Square. ISBN 978-0-297-79136-2
- Gordon, R. Michael (2000). Alias Jack the Ripper: Beyond the Usual Whitechapel Suspects. North Carolina: McFarland Publishing. ISBN 978-0-786-40898-6
- Harris, Melvin (1994). The True Face of Jack the Ripper. London: Michael O'Mara Books Ltd. ISBN 978-1-854-79193-1
- Holmes, Ronald M.; Holmes, Stephen T. (2002). Profiling Violent Crimes: An Investigative Tool. Thousand Oaks, California: Sage Publications, Inc. ISBN 0-761-92594-5
- Honeycombe, Gordon (1982). The Murders of the Black Museum: 1870-1970. London: Bloomsbury Books. ISBN 978-0-863-79040-9
- Lynch, Terry; Davies, David (2008). Jack the Ripper: The Whitechapel Murderer. Hertfordshire: Wordsworth Editions. ISBN 978-1-840-22077-3
- Marriott, Trevor (2005). Jack the Ripper: The 21st Century Investigation. London: John Blake. ISBN 1-84454-103-7
- Storey, Neil R. (2012). East End Murders: From Jack the Ripper to Ronnie Kray. Cheltenham: History Press. ISBN 978-0-752-48445-7
- Rumbelow, Donald (2004). The Complete Jack the Ripper. Fully Revised and Updated. London: Penguin Books. ISBN 978-0-14-017395-6
- Waddell, Bill (1993). The Black Museum: New Scotland Yard. London: Little, Brown and Company. ISBN 978-0-316-90332-5
- White, Jerry (2007). London in the Nineteenth Century. London: Jonathan Cape. ISBN 978-0-224-06272-5
- Whittington-Egan, Richard (2013). Jack the Ripper: The Definitive Casebook. Stroud: Amberley Publishing. ISBN 978-1-445-61768-8
- Wilson, Colin; Odell, Robin (1987) Jack the Ripper: Summing Up and Verdict. Bantam Press. ISBN 0-593-01020-5
