= Whitechapel murders =

1888–1891 East End of London killings

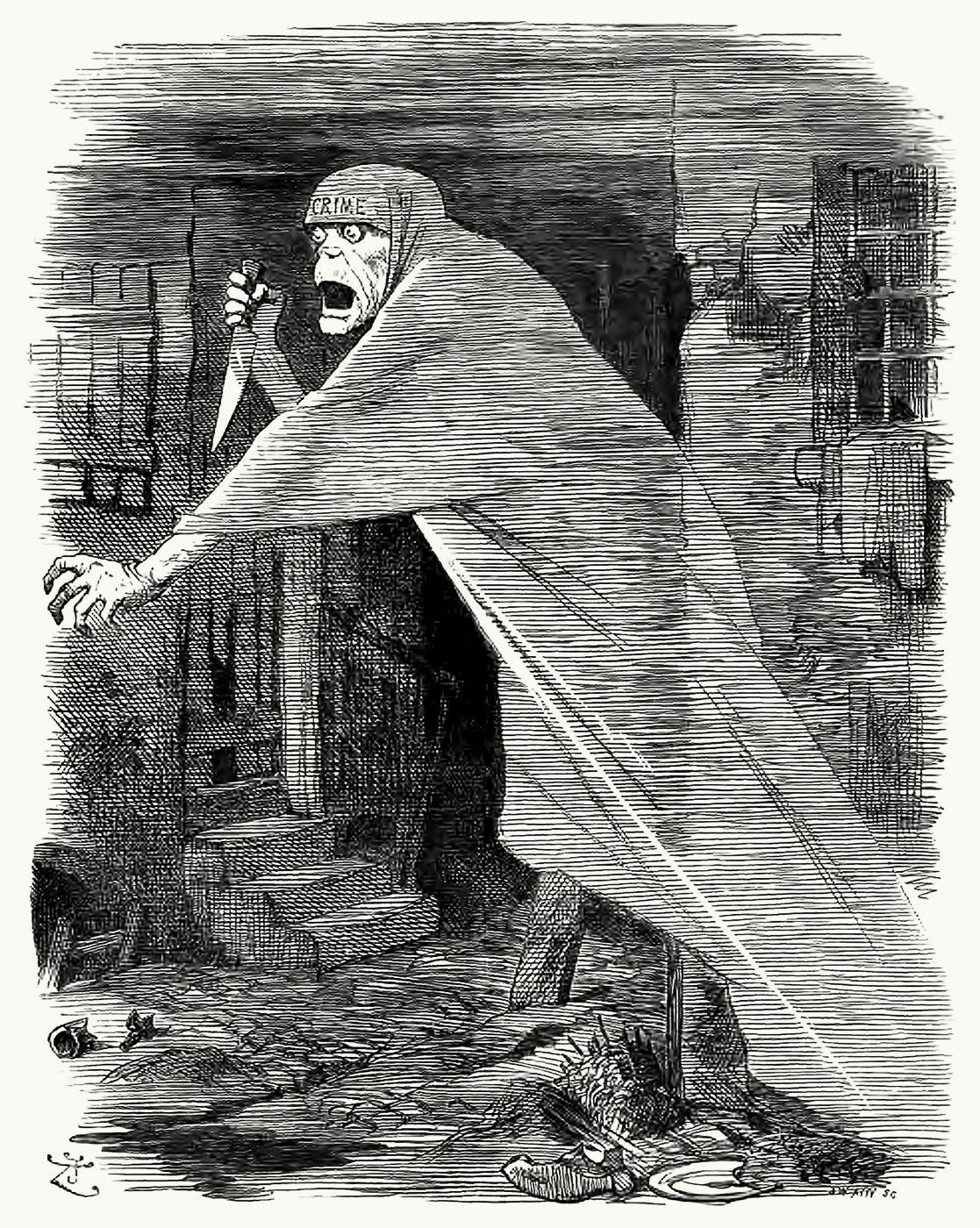
The "Nemesis of Neglect", an image of social destitution manifested as Jack the Ripper, stalks Whitechapel in a Punch cartoon of 1888 by John Tenniel.

Eleven women were murdered in or near the impoverished Whitechapel district in the East End of London between 3 April 1888 and 13 February 1891. At various points, some or all of these unsolved murders have been ascribed to the notorious unidentified serial killer known as Jack the Ripper.

Most, if not all, of the eleven victims – Emma Elizabeth Smith, Martha Tabram, Mary Ann "Polly" Nichols, Annie Chapman, Elizabeth Stride, Catherine Eddowes, Mary Jane Kelly, Rose Mylett, Alice McKenzie, Frances Coles, and an unidentified woman – were engaged in prostitution. Smith was sexually assaulted and robbed by a gang. Tabram was stabbed 39 times. Nichols, Chapman, Stride, Eddowes, Kelly, McKenzie, and Coles had their throats cut. Eddowes and Stride were murdered on the same night, within approximately an hour and less than 1 mi (1,600 m) apart; their murders are known as the "double event", after a phrase in a postcard sent to the press by someone claiming to be the Ripper. The bodies of Nichols, Chapman, Eddowes and Kelly had abdominal mutilations. Mylett was strangled. The body of the unidentified woman had been dismembered and decapitated, but the exact cause of her death is unclear.

The Metropolitan Police, City of London Police, and private organisations such as the Whitechapel Vigilance Committee were actively involved in the search for the perpetrator or perpetrators. Despite extensive enquiries and several arrests, the culprit or culprits evaded capture, and the murders were never solved. The Whitechapel murders drew attention to the poor living conditions in the East End slums, which were subsequently improved. The enduring mystery of who committed the crimes has captured public imagination to the present day.

== Background ==
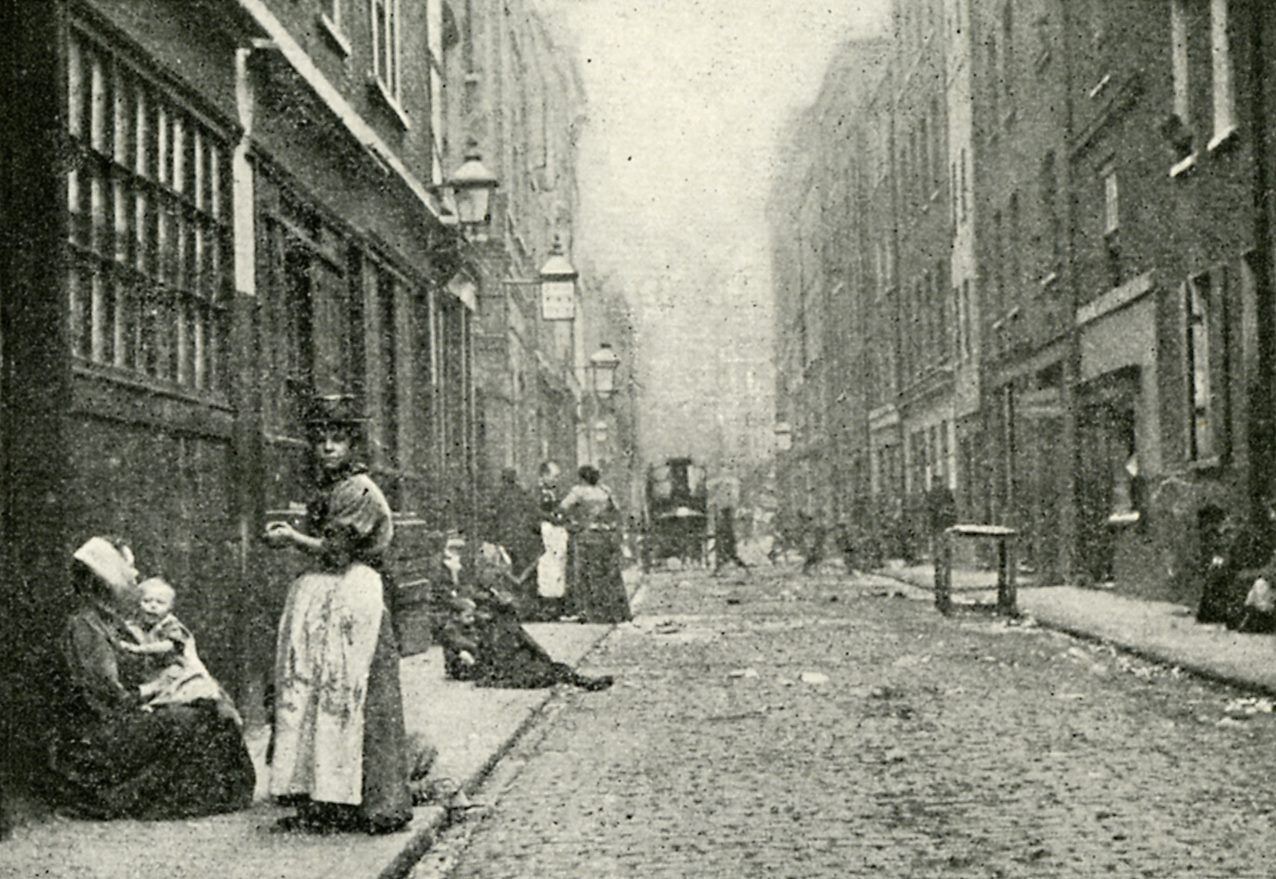
Dorset Street, Spitalfields, seen here in 1902

In the late Victorian era, Whitechapel was considered to be the most notorious criminal rookery in London. The area around Flower and Dean Street was described as "perhaps the foulest and most dangerous street in the whole metropolis"; Dorset Street was called "the worst street in London". Assistant Police Commissioner Robert Anderson recommended Whitechapel to "those who take an interest in the dangerous classes" as one of London's prime criminal "show places". Robbery, violence and alcohol dependency were commonplace. The district was characterised by extreme poverty, sub-standard housing, poor sanitation, homelessness, drunkenness and endemic prostitution. These factors were focused in the institution of the 233 common lodging-houses within Whitechapel, in which approximately 8,500 people resided on a nightly basis.

The common lodging-houses in and around Whitechapel provided cheap communal lodgings for the desperate, the destitute and the transient, among whom the Whitechapel murder victims were numbered. The nightly price of a single bed was 4d (equivalent to £1.87 in 2025) and the cost of sleeping upon a "lean-to" rope stretched across the bedrooms was 2d for adults or children.

All the identified victims of the Whitechapel murders lived within the heart of the rookery in Spitalfields, including three in George Street (later renamed Lolesworth Street), two in Dorset Street, two in Flower and Dean Street, and one in Thrawl Street.

Police work and criminal prosecutions at the time relied heavily on confessions, witness testimony, and apprehending perpetrators in the act of committing an offence or in the possession of obvious physical evidence that clearly linked them to a crime. Forensic techniques, such as fingerprint analysis, were not in use, and blood typing had not been invented. Policing in London was – and still is – divided between two forces: the Metropolitan Police with jurisdiction over most of the urban area, and the City of London Police with jurisdiction over about a square mile (2.9 km^{2}) of the city centre. The Home Secretary, a senior minister of the British government, controlled the Metropolitan Police, whereas the City Police were responsible to the Corporation of London. Beat constables walked regular, timed routes.

Eleven deaths in or near Whitechapel between 1888 and 1891 were gathered into a single file, referred to in the police docket as the "Whitechapel murders". Much of the original material has been stolen, lost, or destroyed.

== Victims and investigation ==
=== Emma Elizabeth Smith ===
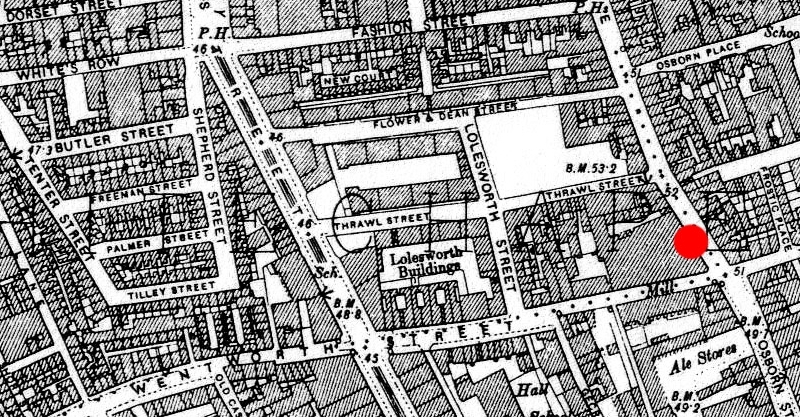
Map of the Spitalfields rookery, where the victims lived. Emma Elizabeth Smith was attacked near the junction of Osborn Street and Brick Lane (red circle). She lived in a common lodging-house at 18 George Street (later renamed Lolesworth Street), one block west of where she was attacked.

On Tuesday 3 April 1888, following the Easter Monday bank holiday, a 45-year-old prostitute, Emma Elizabeth Smith, was assaulted and robbed at the junction of Osborn Street and Brick Lane, Whitechapel, in the early hours of the morning. Although injured, she survived the attack and managed to walk back to her lodging house at 18 George Street, Spitalfields. She told the deputy keeper, Mary Russell, that she had been attacked by two or three men, one of them a teenager. Russell took Smith to the London Hospital, where a medical examination revealed that a blunt object had been inserted into her vagina, rupturing her peritoneum. She developed peritonitis and died at 9:00 am the following day.

The inquest was conducted on 7 April by the coroner for East Middlesex, Wynne Edwin Baxter, who also conducted inquests on six of the later victims. The local inspector of the Metropolitan Police, Edmund Reid of H Division Whitechapel, investigated the attack, but the culprits were never caught. Walter Dew, a detective constable stationed with H Division, later wrote that he believed Smith to be the first victim of Jack the Ripper, but his colleagues suspected her murder was the work of a criminal gang. Smith claimed that she was attacked by two or three men, but either refused to or could not describe them beyond stating one was a teenager. East End prostitutes were often managed by gangs, and Smith may have been attacked by her pimps as a punishment for disobeying them or as an act of intimidation. She may not have identified her attackers because she feared reprisal. Her murder is considered unlikely to be connected with the later killings.

=== Martha Tabram ===
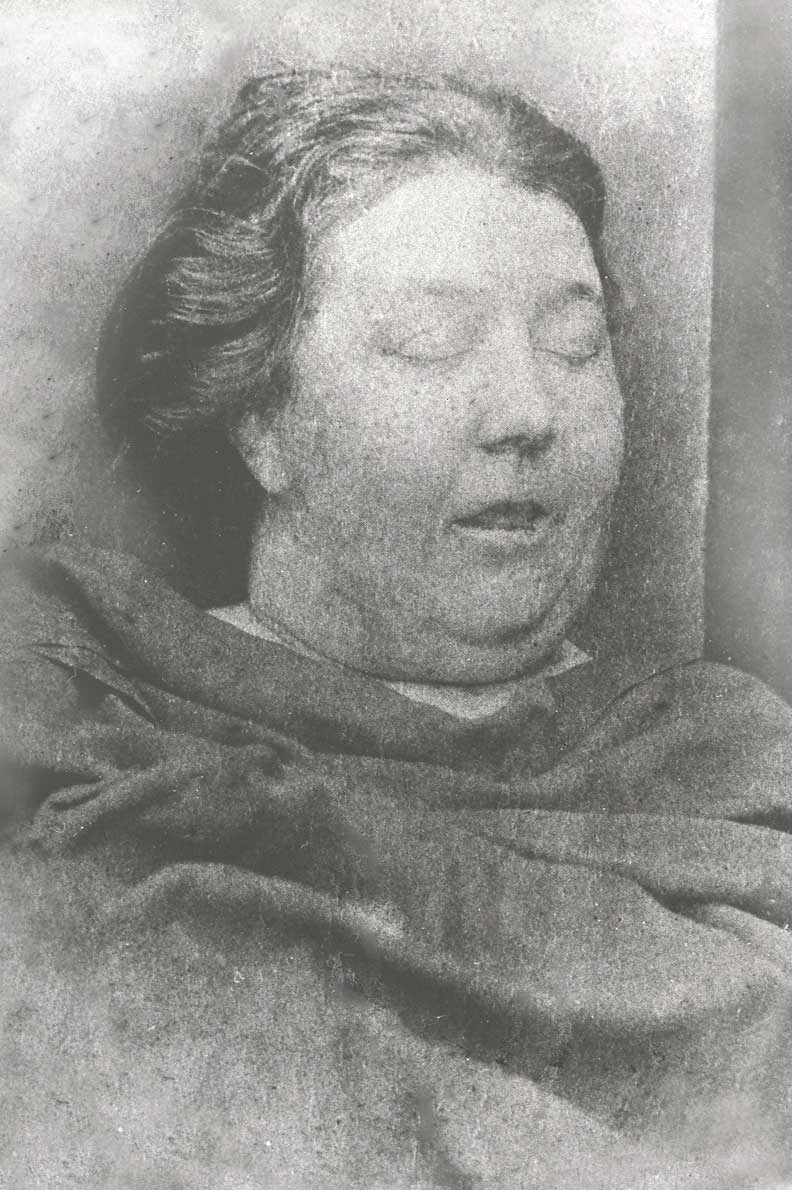
Martha Tabram, 39, lived in a lodging-house at 19 George Street.

On Tuesday 7 August, following a Monday bank holiday, Martha Tabram, a prostitute, was murdered at about 2:30 am. Her body was found at George Yard Buildings, George Yard, Whitechapel, shortly before 5:00 am. She had been stabbed 39 times about her neck, torso and genitals with a short blade. With one possible exception, all her wounds had been inflicted by a right-handed person.

On the basis of statements from a fellow prostitute, and PC Thomas Barrett, who was patrolling nearby, Inspector Reid put soldiers at the Tower of London and Wellington Barracks on an identification parade, but without positive results. Police did not connect Tabram's murder with the earlier murder of Emma Smith; however, they did connect her death with later murders.

Most experts do not connect Tabram's murder with the others attributed to the Ripper because she had been repeatedly stabbed, whereas later victims typically suffered slash wounds and abdominal mutilations; however, a connection cannot be ruled out.

=== Mary Ann Nichols ===
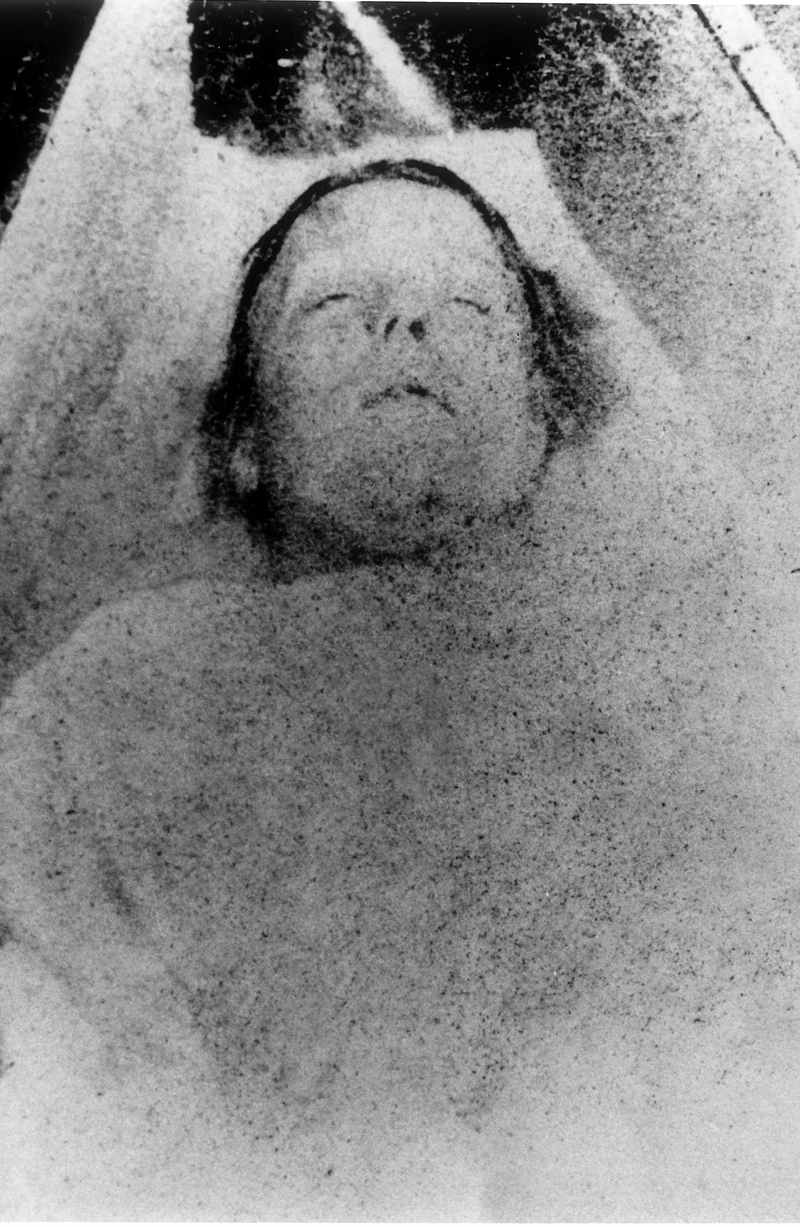
Mary Ann Nichols, 43, lived in a lodging-house at 18 Thrawl Street.

On Friday 31 August, Mary Ann Nichols was murdered in Buck's Row (since renamed Durward Street), a back street in Whitechapel. Her body was discovered by cart driver Charles Cross at 3:45 am on the ground in front of a gated stable entrance. Her throat had been slit twice from left to right and her abdomen was mutilated by a deep, jagged wound. Several shallower incisions across the abdomen, and three or four similar cuts on the right side were caused by the same knife used violently and downwards. As the murder occurred in the territory of the J or Bethnal Green Division of the Metropolitan Police, it was at first investigated by the local detectives. On the same day, James Monro resigned as the head of the Criminal Investigation Department (CID) over differences with Chief Commissioner of the Metropolitan Police Sir Charles Warren.

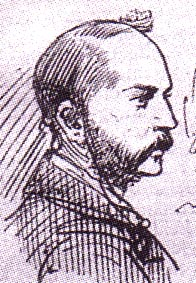
Inspector Frederick Abberline led the police investigation.

Initial investigations into the murder had little success, although elements of the press linked it to the two previous murders and suggested the killing might have been perpetrated by a gang, as in the case of Smith. The Star newspaper suggested instead that a single killer was responsible, and other newspapers took up their storyline. Suspicions of a serial killer at large in London led to the secondment of Detective Inspectors Frederick Abberline, Henry Moore and Walter Andrews from the Central Office at Scotland Yard. On the available evidence, Coroner Baxter concluded that Nichols was murdered at just after 3 am where she was found. In his summing up, he dismissed the possibility that her murder was connected with those of Smith and Tabram, as the lethal weapons were different in those cases, and neither of the earlier cases involved a slash to the throat. However, by the time the inquest into Nichols's death had concluded, a fourth woman had been murdered, on which Baxter noted, "The similarity of the injuries in the two cases is considerable."

=== Annie Chapman ===
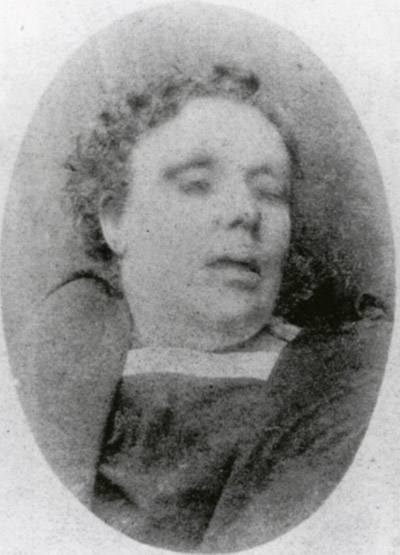
Annie Chapman, 47, lived in a lodging-house at 35 Dorset Street.

The mutilated body of the fourth woman, Annie Chapman, was discovered at about 6:00 am on Saturday 8 September on the ground near a doorway in the back yard of 29 Hanbury Street, Spitalfields. Chapman had left her lodgings at 2 am on the day she was murdered, with the intention of getting money from a client to pay her rent. Her throat was cut from left to right. She had been disembowelled, and her intestines had been thrown out of her abdomen over each of her shoulders. The morgue examination revealed that part of her uterus was missing. The pathologist, George Bagster Phillips, was of the opinion that the murderer must have possessed anatomical knowledge to have sliced out the reproductive organs in a single movement with a blade about 6–8 inches (15–20 centimetres) long. The idea that the murderer possessed surgical skill was dismissed by other experts. As the bodies were not examined extensively at the scene, it has also been suggested that the organs were removed by mortuary staff, who took advantage of bodies that had already been opened to extract organs that they could sell as surgical specimens.

On 10 September, the police arrested a notorious local called John Pizer, dubbed "Leather Apron", who had a reputation for terrorising local prostitutes. His alibis for the two most recent murders were corroborated, and he was released without charge. At the inquest, one of the witnesses, Mrs Elizabeth Long, testified that she had seen Chapman talking to a man at about 5:30 am just beyond the back yard of 29 Hanbury Street, where Chapman was later found. Baxter inferred that the man Mrs Long had seen was the murderer. Mrs Long described him as over forty, a little taller than Chapman, of dark complexion and of foreign, "shabby-genteel" appearance. He was wearing a brown deerstalker hat and a dark overcoat. Another witness, Albert Cadosch, a carpenter, had entered the neighbouring yard at 27 Hanbury Street at about the same time, and he heard voices in the yard followed by the sound of something or someone falling against the fence.

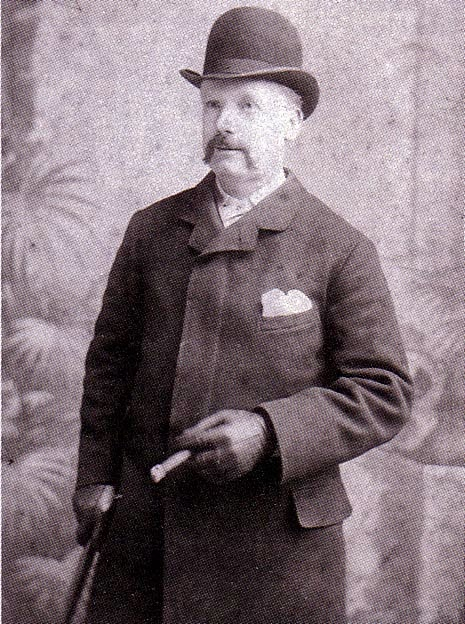
George Lusk, President of the Whitechapel Vigilance Committee

In his memoirs, Walter Dew recorded that the killings caused widespread panic in London. A mob attacked the Commercial Road police station, suspecting that the murderer was being held there. Samuel Montagu, the Member of Parliament for Whitechapel, offered a reward of £100 (roughly £11,000 as of 2025) after rumours that the attacks were Jewish ritual killings led to anti-Semitic demonstrations. Local residents founded the Whitechapel Vigilance Committee under the chairmanship of George Lusk and offered a reward for the apprehension of the killer – something the Metropolitan Police (under instruction from the Home Office) refused to do because such an action could lead to false or misleading information. The Committee employed two private detectives to investigate the case.

Robert Anderson was appointed head of the CID on 1 September, but he went on sick leave to Switzerland on the 7th. Superintendent Thomas Arnold, who was in charge of H (Whitechapel) Division, went on leave on 2 September. Anderson's absence left overall direction of the enquiries confused, and led Chief Commissioner Sir Charles Warren to appoint Chief Inspector Donald Swanson to co-ordinate the investigation from Scotland Yard. A German hairdresser named Charles Ludwig was taken into custody on 18 September on suspicion of the murders, but he was released less than two weeks later when a double murder demonstrated that the real culprit was still at large.

=== Double event: Elizabeth Stride and Catherine Eddowes ===
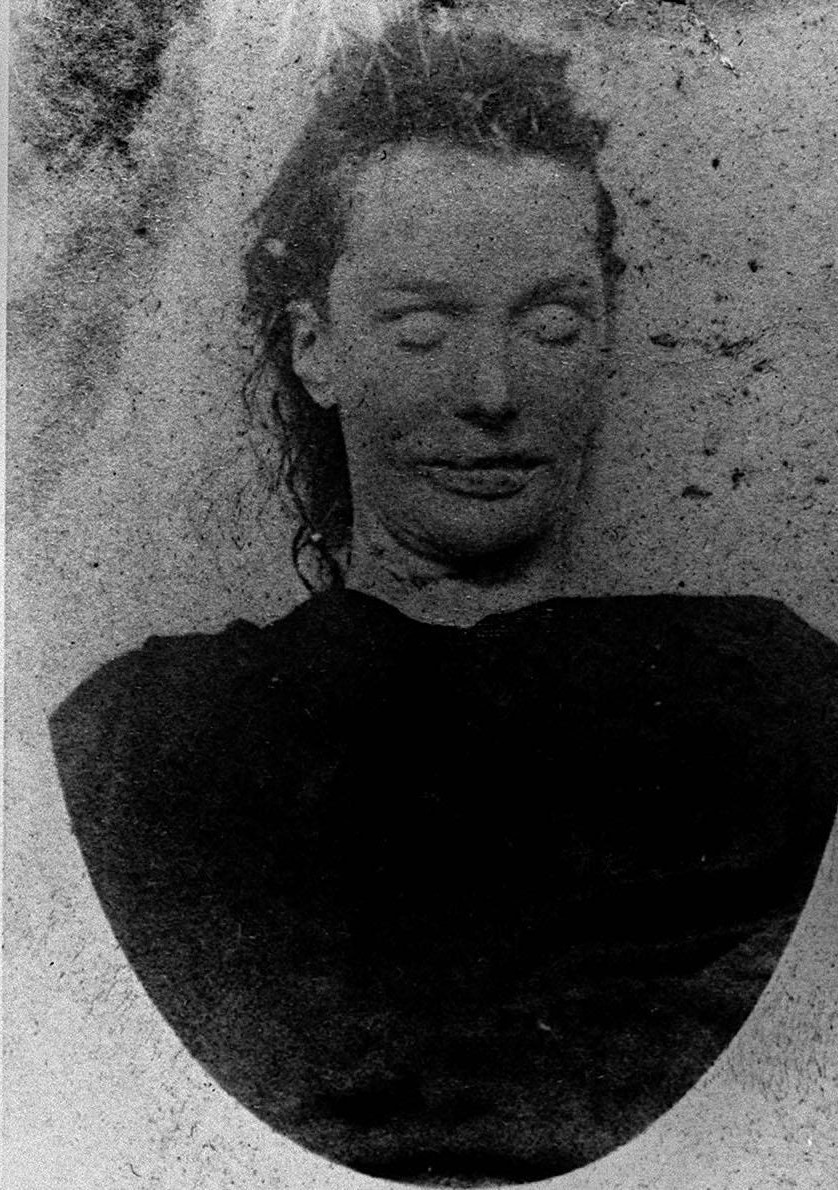
Elizabeth Stride, 44, lived in a lodging-house at 32 Flower and Dean Street.

On Sunday 30 September, the body of Elizabeth Stride, another prostitute, was discovered at about 1 am in Dutfield's Yard, inside the gateway of 40 Berner Street (since renamed Henriques Street), Whitechapel. She was lying in a pool of blood with her throat cut from left to right. She had been killed just minutes before, and her body was otherwise unmutilated. It is possible that the murderer was disturbed before he could commit any mutilation of the body by someone entering the yard, perhaps Louis Diemschutz, who discovered the body. Some commentators on the case conclude that Stride's murder was unconnected to the others on the basis that the body was unmutilated, that it was the only murder to occur south of Whitechapel Road, and that the blade used might have been shorter and of a different design. Most experts consider the similarities in the case distinctive enough to connect Stride's murder with at least two of the earlier ones, as well as that of Catherine Eddowes on the same night.

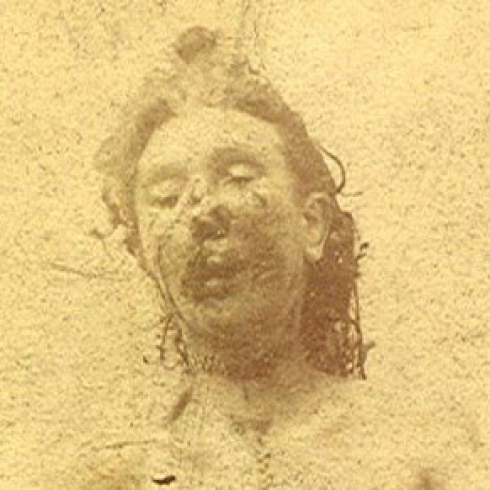
Catherine Eddowes, 46, lived with partner John Kelly in a lodging-house at 55 Flower and Dean Street.

At 1:45 am, Catherine Eddowes's mutilated body was found by PC Edward Watkins at the south-west corner of Mitre Square, in the City of London, about 12 minutes walk from Berner Street. She had been killed less than 10 minutes earlier by a slash to the throat from left to right with a sharp, pointed knife at least 6 inches (15 cm) long. Her face and abdomen were mutilated, and her intestines were drawn out over the right shoulder with a detached length between her torso and left arm. Her left kidney and most of her uterus were removed. The Eddowes inquest was opened on 4 October by Samuel F. Langham, coroner for the City of London. The examining pathologist, Dr Frederick Gordon Brown, believed the perpetrator "had considerable knowledge of the position of the organs" and from the position of the wounds on the body he could tell that the murderer had knelt to the right of the body, and worked alone. The first doctor at the scene, local surgeon George William Sequeira, disputed that the killer possessed anatomical skill or sought particular organs. His view was shared by City medical officer William Sedgwick Saunders, who was also present at the autopsy. Because of this murder's location, the City of London Police under Detective Inspector James McWilliam were brought into the enquiry.

At 3 am, a blood-stained fragment of Eddowes's apron was found lying in the passage of the doorway leading to 108 to 119 Goulston Street, Whitechapel, about one-third of a mile (540 m) from the murder scene. There was chalk writing on the wall of the doorway, which read either "The Juwes are the men that will not be blamed for nothing" or "The Juwes are not the men who will be blamed for nothing." At 5 am, Commissioner Warren attended the scene and ordered the words erased for fear that they would incite anti-Semitic riots. Goulston Street was on a direct route from Mitre Square to Flower and Dean Street, where both Stride and Eddowes lived.

The Middlesex coroner, Wynne Baxter, believed that Stride had been attacked with a swift, sudden action. She was still holding a packet of cachous (breath-freshening sweets) in her left hand when she was discovered, indicating that she had not had time to defend herself. A grocer, Matthew Packer, implied to private detectives employed by the Whitechapel Vigilance Committee that he had sold some grapes to Stride and the murderer; however, he had told police that he had shut his shop without seeing anything suspicious. At the inquest, the pathologists stated emphatically that Stride had not held, swallowed, or consumed grapes. They described her stomach contents as "cheese, potatoes and farinaceous powder [flour or milled grain]". Nevertheless, Packer's story appeared in the press. Packer's description of the man did not match the statements by other witnesses who may have seen Stride with a man shortly before her murder, but all but two of the descriptions differed. A cigarette maker, Joseph Lawende, passed through Mitre Square with two other men shortly before Eddowes was murdered there, and may have seen her with a man of about 30 years old, who was shabbily dressed, wore a peaked cap, and had a fair moustache. Chief Inspector Swanson noted that Lawende's description was a near match to another provided by one of the witnesses who may have seen Stride with her murderer. But Lawende stated that he would not be able to identify the man again, and the two other men with Lawende were unable to give descriptions.

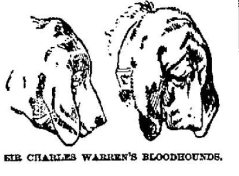
Illustration of Burgho and Barnaby by Louis Wain, Illustrated London News, 20 October 1888, page 452

Criticism of the Metropolitan Police and the Home Secretary, Henry Matthews, continued to mount as little progress was made with the investigation. The City Police and the Lord Mayor of London offered a reward of £500 (roughly £56,000 as of 2025) for information leading to the capture of the villain. The use of bloodhounds to track the killer in the event of another attack was considered, and Warren not only loaned two named Burgho and Barnaby by England's leading bloodhound trainer, Edwin Brough, of Wyndyate near Scarborough (now Scalby Manor), but also agreed to be tracked across Hyde Park by them himself as a public demonstration of their efficacy. The idea was abandoned because the trail of scents was confused in the busy city, the dogs were inexperienced in an urban environment, and Brough was concerned that the dogs would be poisoned by criminals if their role in crime detection became known.

On 27 September, the Central News Agency received a letter, dubbed the "Dear Boss" letter, in which the writer, who signed himself "Jack the Ripper", claimed to have committed the murders. On 1 October, a postcard also signed "Jack the Ripper", dubbed the "Saucy Jacky" postcard, was received by the agency. It claimed responsibility for the most recent murders on 30 September, and described the murders of the two women as the "double event", a designation which has endured.

On Tuesday 2 October, an unidentified female torso was found in the basement of New Scotland Yard, which was under construction. It was linked to the Whitechapel murders by the press, but it was not included in the Whitechapel murders file, and any connection between the two is now considered unlikely. The case became known as the Whitehall Mystery. On the same day, the psychic Robert James Lees visited Scotland Yard and offered to track down the murderer using paranormal powers; the police turned him away and "called [him] a fool and a lunatic".

The head of the CID, Anderson, eventually returned from leave on 6 October and took charge of the investigation for Scotland Yard. On 16 October, George Lusk of the Whitechapel Vigilance Committee received another letter, known as the "From Hell" letter, claiming to be from the killer. The handwriting and style were unlike that of the "Dear Boss" letter and "Saucy Jacky" postcard. The letter arrived with a small box containing half of a human kidney preserved in alcohol. The letter's writer claimed that he had extracted it from the body of Eddowes and that he "fried and ate" the missing half. Opinion on whether the kidney and the letter were genuine was and is divided. By the end of October, the police had interviewed more than 2,000 people, investigated "upwards of 300", and detained 80.

=== Mary Jane Kelly ===
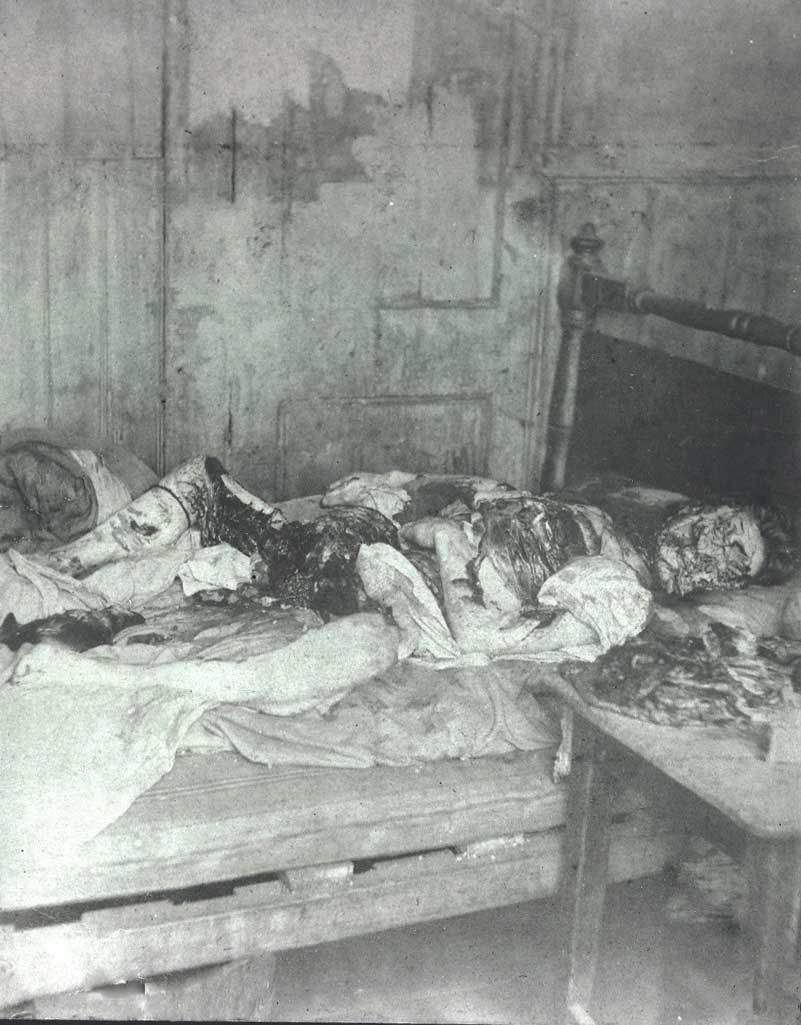
The body of Mary Jane Kelly, 25, photographed at the scene of her murder

On Friday 9 November, Mary Jane Kelly, a prostitute, was murdered in the single room where she lived at 13 Miller's Court, behind 26 Dorset Street, Spitalfields. One of the earlier victims, Chapman, had lived in Dorset Street, and another, Eddowes, was reported to have occasionally slept rough there. Kelly's severely mutilated body was discovered shortly after 10:45 am lying on the bed. The first doctor at the scene, Dr George Bagster Phillips, believed that Kelly was killed by a slash to the throat. After her death, her abdominal cavity was sliced open and all her viscera removed and spread around the room. Her breasts had been cut off, her face mutilated beyond recognition, and her thighs partially cut through to the bone with some of the muscles removed. Unlike the other victims, she was undressed and wore only a light chemise. Her clothes were folded neatly on a chair, with the exception of some found burnt in the grate. Abberline thought the clothes had been burned by the murderer to provide light, as the room was otherwise only dimly lit by a single candle. Kelly's murder was the most savage, probably because the murderer had more time to commit his atrocities in a private room rather than in the street. Her state of undress and folded clothes have led to suggestions that she undressed herself before lying down on the bed, which would indicate that she was killed by someone she knew, by someone she believed to be a client, or when she was asleep or intoxicated.

The coroner for North East Middlesex, Dr Roderick Macdonald, MP, presided over the inquest into Kelly's death at Shoreditch Town Hall on 12 November. Amid scenes of great emotion, an "enormous crowd" of mourners attended Mary Kelly's funeral on 19 November. The streets became gridlocked and the cortège struggled to travel from Shoreditch mortuary to the Roman Catholic cemetery at Leytonstone, where she was laid to rest.

On 8 November, Charles Warren resigned as Commissioner of the Metropolitan Police after the Home Secretary informed him that he could not make public statements without Home Office approval. James Monro, who had resigned a few months earlier over differences with Warren, was appointed as his replacement in December. On 10 November, the police surgeon Thomas Bond wrote to Robert Anderson, head of the London CID, detailing the similarities between the five murders of Nichols, Chapman, Stride, Eddowes and Kelly, "no doubt committed by the same hand". On the same day, the Cabinet resolved to offer a pardon to any accomplice who came forward with information that led to the conviction of the actual murderer. The Metropolitan Police Commissioner reported that the Whitechapel murderer remained unidentified despite 143 extra plain-clothes policemen deployed in Whitechapel in November and December.

=== Rose Mylett ===
On Thursday 20 December 1888, a patrolling constable found the strangled body of a 26-year-old prostitute, Rose Mylett, in Clarke's Yard, off Poplar High Street. Mylett (born Catherine Milett and known as Drunken Lizzie Davis, as well as Fair Alice Downey) had lodged at 18 George Street, as had Emma Smith.

Four doctors who examined Mylett's body thought she had been murdered, but Robert Anderson thought she had accidentally hanged herself on the collar of her dress while in a drunken stupor. At Anderson's request, Bond examined Mylett's body, and he agreed with Anderson. Commissioner Monro also suspected it was a suicide or natural death as there were no signs of a struggle. The coroner, Wynne Baxter, told the inquest jury that "there is no evidence to show that death was the result of violence". Nevertheless, the jury returned a verdict of "wilful murder against some person or persons unknown" and the case was added to the Whitechapel file.

=== Alice McKenzie ===
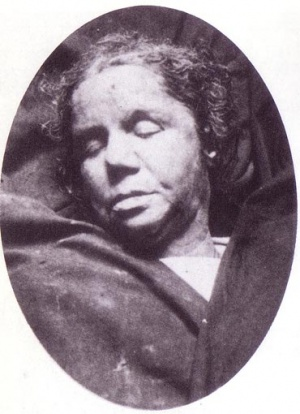
Alice McKenzie, 40, lived in a lodging-house at 52 Gun Street.

Alice McKenzie, possibly a prostitute, was murdered at about 12:40 am on Wednesday 17 July 1889 in Castle Alley, Whitechapel. As in most of the previous murders, her left carotid artery was severed from left to right and there were wounds on her abdomen. Her wounds were not as deep as in previous murders, and a shorter blade was used. Commissioner Monro and one of the pathologists examining the body, Bond, believed this to be a Ripper murder, though another of the pathologists, Phillips, and Robert Anderson disagreed, as did Inspector Abberline.

Later writers are also divided and suggest either that McKenzie was a Ripper victim or that the unknown murderer tried to make it look like a Ripper killing to deflect suspicion from himself. At the inquest, Coroner Baxter acknowledged both possibilities, and concluded: "There is great similarity between this and the other class of cases, which have happened in this neighbourhood, and if the same person has not committed this crime, it is clearly an imitation of the other cases."

=== Pinchin Street torso ===
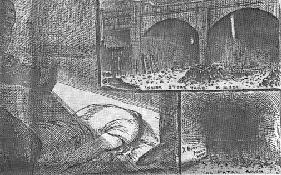
Contemporary illustration of the discovery of the Pinchin Street torso

A woman's torso was found at 5:15 am on Tuesday 10 September 1889 under a railway arch in Pinchin Street, Whitechapel. Extensive bruising about the victim's back, hip, and arm indicated that she had been severely beaten shortly before her death, which had occurred approximately one day prior to the discovery of her torso. The victim's abdomen was also extensively mutilated in a manner reminiscent of the Ripper, although her genitals had not been wounded. The dismembered sections of the body are believed to have been transported to the railway arch, hidden under an old chemise. The age of the victim was estimated at 30–40 years. Despite a search of the area, no other sections of her body were ever found, and neither the victim nor the culprit were ever identified.

Chief Inspector Donald Swanson and Commissioner James Monro noted that the presence of blood within the torso indicated that death was not from haemorrhage or cutting of the throat. But the pathologists found that the general bloodlessness of the tissues and vessels indicated that haemorrhage was the cause of death. Newspaper speculation that the body belonged to Lydia Hart, who had disappeared, was refuted after she was found recovering in hospital after "a bit of a spree". Another claim that the victim was a missing girl called Emily Barker was also refuted, as the torso was from an older and taller woman.

Swanson did not consider this a Ripper case and instead suggested a link to the Thames Torso Murders in Rainham and Chelsea, as well as the "Whitehall Mystery". Monro agreed with Swanson's assessment. These three murders and the Pinchin Street case are suggested to be the work of a serial killer, nicknamed the "Torso killer", who could either be the same person as "Jack the Ripper" or a separate killer of uncertain connection. Links between these and three further murders – the "Battersea Mystery" of 1873 and 1874, in which two women were found dismembered, and the 1884 "Tottenham Court Road Mystery" – have also been postulated. Experts on the murders – colloquially known as "Ripperologists" – such as Stewart Evans, Keith Skinner, Martin Fido, and Donald Rumbelow discount any connection between the torso and the Ripper killings on the basis of their different modi operandi.

Monro was replaced as Commissioner by Sir Edward Bradford on 21 June 1890 after a disagreement with Home Secretary Henry Matthews over police pensions.

=== Frances Coles ===
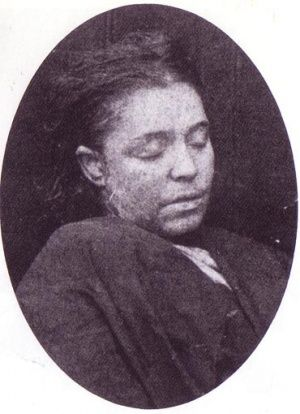
Frances Coles lived in a lodging-house in White's Row.

The last of the murders in the Whitechapel file was committed on Friday 13 February 1891, when Frances Coles, a prostitute, was murdered under a railway arch in Swallow Gardens, Whitechapel. Her body was found at 2:15 am, only moments after the attack, by PC Ernest Thompson, who later stated that he heard retreating footsteps in the distance. As contemporary police practices dictated, Thompson remained at the scene.

Coles was lying beneath a passageway under a railway arch between Chamber Street and Royal Mint Street. She was still alive, but died before medical help could arrive. Minor wounds on the back of her head suggest that she was thrown violently to the ground before her throat was cut at least twice, from left to right and then back again. Otherwise there were no mutilations to the body, leading some to believe Thompson had disturbed her assailant. Superintendent Arnold and Inspector Reid arrived soon afterwards from the nearby Leman Street police station, and Chief Inspectors Donald Swanson and Henry Moore, who had been involved in the previous murder investigations, arrived by 5 am.

A man named James Sadler, who had earlier been seen with Coles, was arrested by the police and charged with her murder. A high-profile investigation by Swanson and Moore into Sadler's history and his whereabouts at the time of the previous Whitechapel murders indicates that the police may have suspected him to be the Ripper. Sadler was released on 3 March for lack of evidence.

== Legacy ==
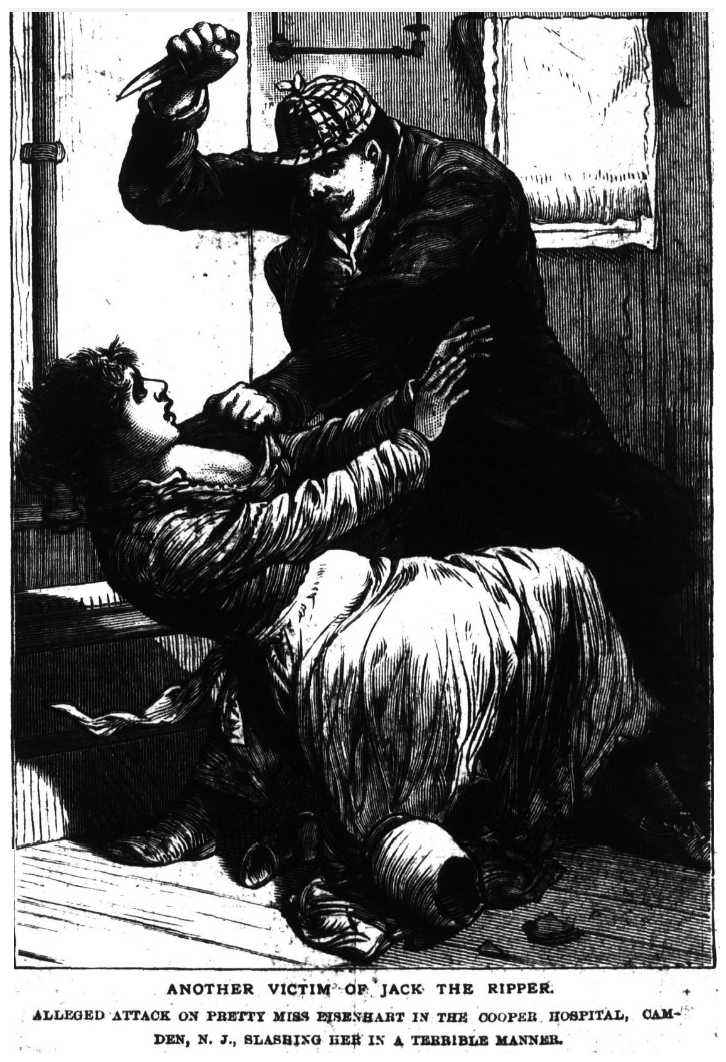
February 1889 National Police Gazette illustration referencing the Whitechapel murders

The murderer or murderers were never identified, and the cases remain unsolved. Sensational reportage and the mystery surrounding the identity of the killer or killers fed the development of the character "Jack the Ripper", who was blamed for all or most of the murders. Hundreds of books and articles discuss the Whitechapel murders, and they feature in novels, short stories, comic books, television shows, and films of multiple genres.

The poor of the East End had long been ignored by affluent society, but the nature of the Whitechapel murders and of the victims' impoverished lifestyles drew national attention to their living conditions. The murders galvanised public opinion against the overcrowded, unsanitary slums of the East End and led to demands for reform. On 24 September 1888, George Bernard Shaw commented sarcastically on the media's sudden concern with social justice in a letter to The Star newspaper:

Whilst we conventional Social Democrats were wasting our time on education, agitation and organisation, some independent genius has taken the matter in hand, and by simply murdering and disembowelling ... women, converted the proprietary press to an inept sort of communism.

Acts of Parliament, such as the Housing of the Working Classes Act 1890 and the Public Health Amendment Act 1890, set minimum standards for accommodation in an effort to transform degenerated urban areas. The worst of the slums were demolished in the two decades following the Whitechapel murders.

Abberline retired in 1892, and Matthews lost his position as Home Secretary in the 1892 general election. Arnold retired the following year, and Swanson and Anderson retired after 1900. No document in the Whitechapel murders file dates to after 1896.

== See also ==
- List of fugitives from justice who disappeared
- List of murderers by number of victims
- List of serial killers before 1900
