= Scalby Manor =

House in North Yorkshire, England

Coordinates: 54°18′13.1″N 0°25′29.8″W

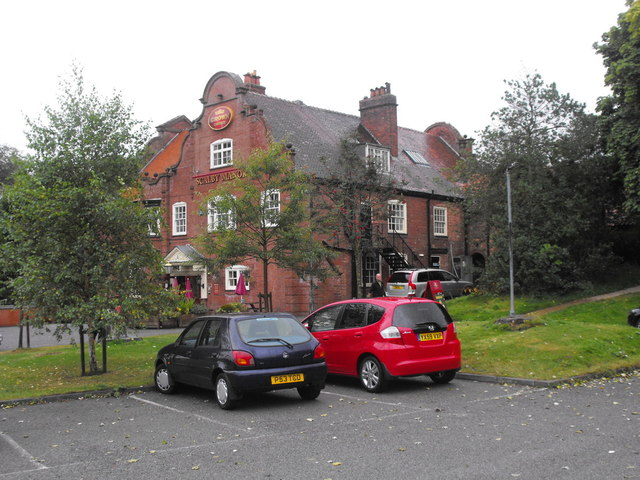
Scalby Manor

Scalby Manor near Scarborough, North Yorkshire, was built in 1885 by Edwin Brough. He was the leading breeder and trainer in England of bloodhounds at his time, and when the Whitechapel murders occurred several years later he was invited by the Commissioner of Police to help track the killer. The house which was then called Wyndyate remained a private residence until the late 1930s, when it was used as a guest house and then became a hotel. Today it is a restaurant and a pub.

== Edwin Brough ==
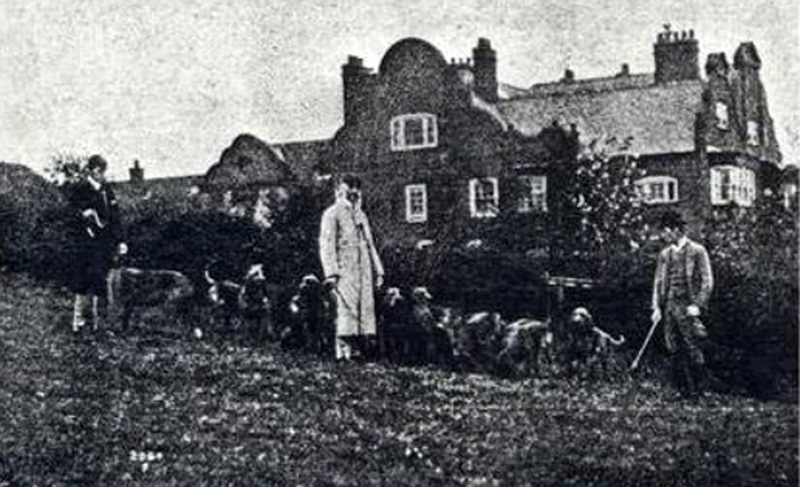
Edwin Brough (centre) at Scalby Manor (then Wyndyate) with his bloodhounds

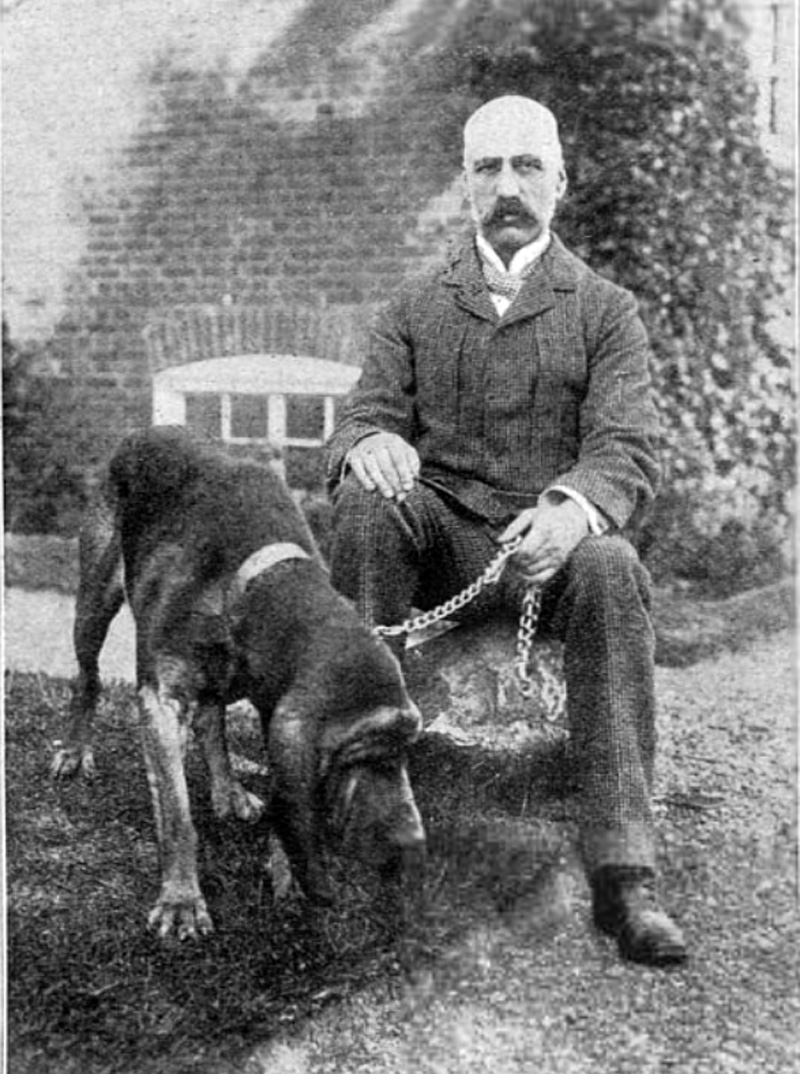
Edwin Brough with one of his bloodhounds

Edwin Brough (1844–1929) was born in 1844 in Leek, Staffordshire. His father was John Brough, who was a partner in the family silk manufacturing company of Brough, Nicholson & Hall Ltd. His grandfather had founded the firm in 1812. At an early age Edwin entered the family business and in 1869 became a partner in the company.

In 1882 at the age of 38 he married Helen Graham (1849–1923), and three years later he commissioned the famous architects Sugden & Son to build Scalby Manor (then called Wyndyate). He retired from the silk manufacturing firm and became a bloodhound breeder and trainer. He had started breeding bloodhounds in 1871 and by 1888 had become one of the leading bloodhound experts in England. His kennels at Scalby Manor still exist. In 1888 the Whitechapel murders were causing outcry and alarm. Indignant at the impotence of the police, the public plied the authorities with no less than 1,200 letters per day containing suggestions for the murderer's capture. Of these 800 advocated the trial of bloodhounds. The Police Commissioner Sir Charles Warren contacted Edwin and asked him to demonstrate the skills of his dogs so that they could track Jack the Ripper. On 4 October 1888 Edwin received a communication from the police and on the following Saturday he went to London with his two best dogs called Barnaby and Burgho. The dogs worked together as a team and had been trained to hunt “the clean shoe”. That is to follow the trail of a man whose shoes have not been prepared in any way by the application of blood or aniseed which would leave a strong trail. A description of his gentle training methods was given in a newspaper of that time. It also described the trials which read as follows.

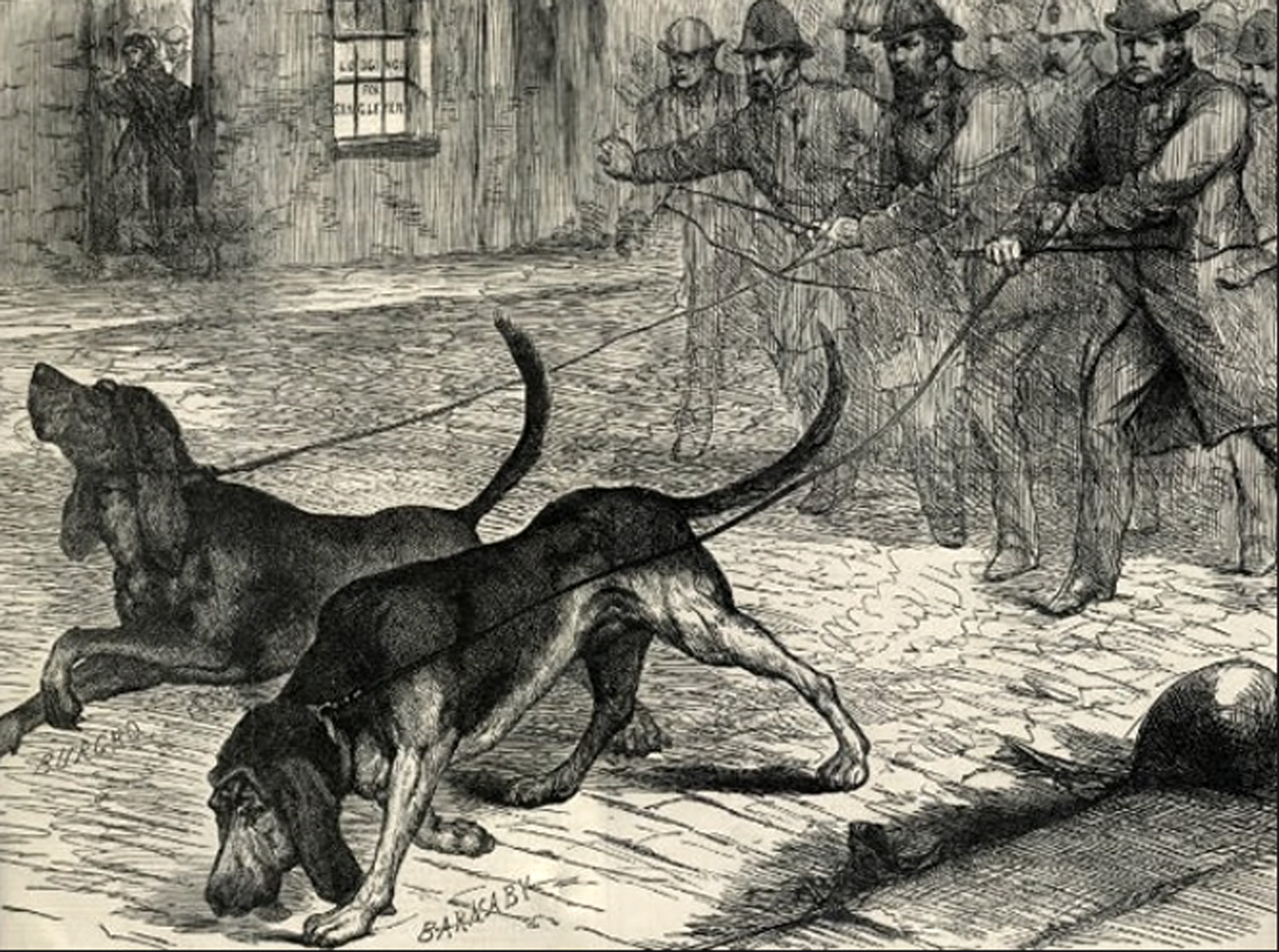
Illustration from The Penny Illustrated Paper of 20 October 1888 with the caption saying "Sir Charles Warren's new criminal trackers: Mr Brough's bloodhounds being trained"

"Mr. Brough tried Barnaby and Burgho in Regent's Park. The ground was thickly covered with hoar frost, but they did their work well, successfully tracking for nearly a mile a young man who was given about fifteen minutes start. They were tried again in Hyde Park at night. It was, of course, dark, and the dogs were hunted on a leash, as would be the case if they were employed in Whitechapel. They were again successful in performing their allotted task, and a trial took place before Sir Charles Warren. In all half a dozen runs were made, Sir Charles Warren, in two instances, acting as the hunted man. In every instance the dogs hunted persons who were complete strangers to them, and occasionally the trail would be crossed. When this happened the hounds were temporarily checked, but either one or other would pick up the trail again. In one of the longest courses the hounds were checked at half the distance. Burgho ran back, but Barnaby making a fresh cast forward recovered the trail and ran the quarry home. The hound did this entirely unaided by his master, who thought he was on the wrong track but left him to his own devices. In consequence of the coldness of the scent the hounds worked very slowly, but they demonstrated the possibility of tracking complete strangers on to whose trail they had been laid. The chief commissioner seemed pleased with the result of the trials".

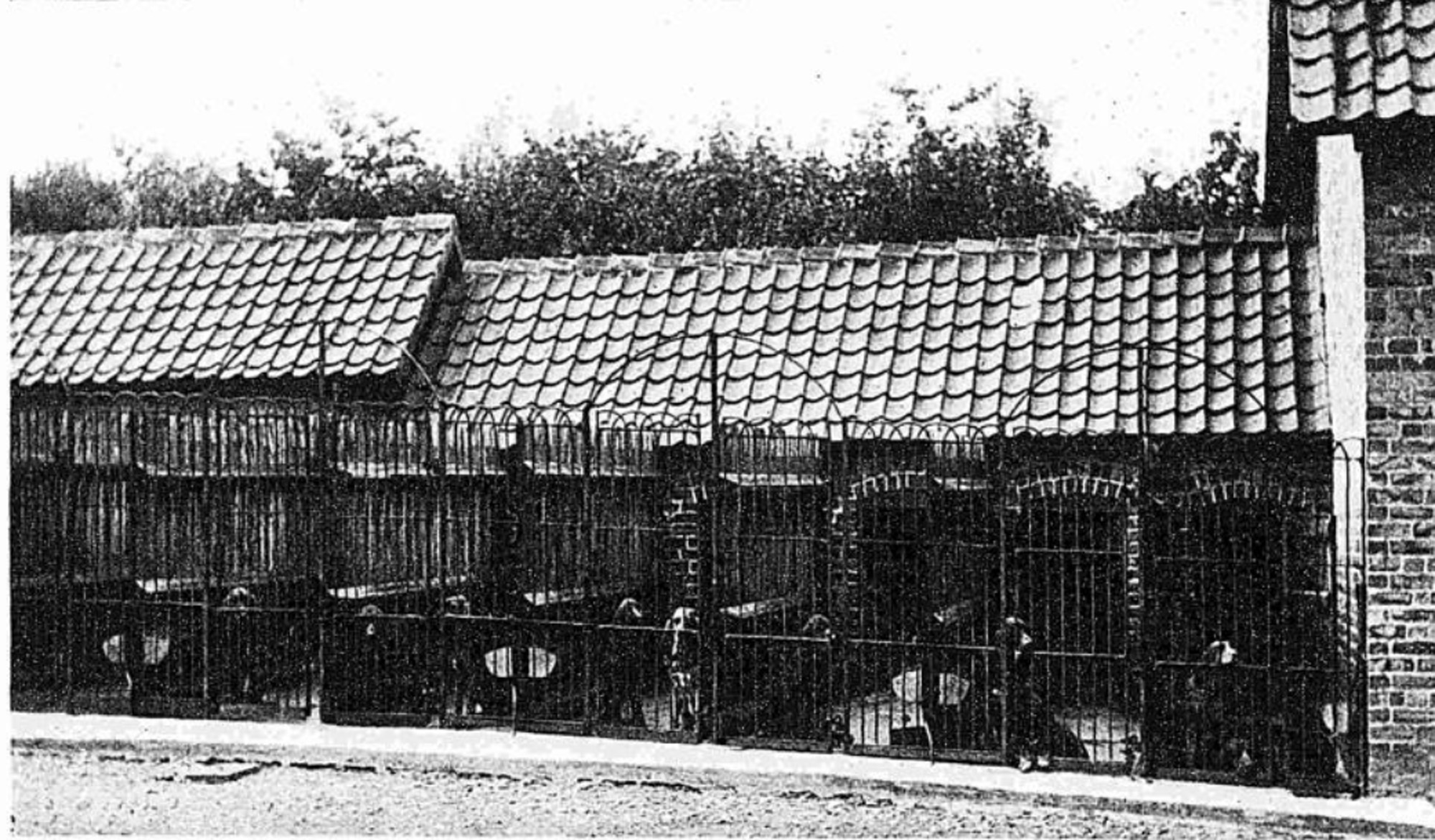
The kennels of Edwin Brough at Scalby Manor (then called Wyndyate)

During the weeks the hounds were in London no further crime occurred, and the opportunity of utilising their services was lost. Sir Charles kept them until it seemed that the Jack the Ripper scare was over. The hounds were then returned to Edwin. They had not left London more than two or three days when another murder was committed. Obviously their presence exercised a deterrent effect on the killer.

Several reporters visited Scalby Manor in the late nineteenth century and gave a detailed description of the property. The Windsor Magazine reporter A. Croxton-Smith came in 1895 and described his kennels in the following terms.

"At the rear of his pleasant Queen Anne house, a couple of miles north of Scarborough, Mr. Brough has a model range of kennels and runs, nothing being left undone that will add to the comfort of the inmates. Every attention is paid to the sanitary arrangements, and the method by which a constant supply of water is carried to each kennel deserves a word of praise."

In 1901 The Scarborough Magazine made the following observations.

"From the house we passed through the beautifully kept grounds to the extensive yards in the rear, where Mr. Brough has a model range of kennels and runs, nothing being left undone that will add to the comfort of the inmates. Each kennel has its own run in front, allowing the pair of occupants plenty of room in which to exercise. At present Mr. Brough has about twenty adult hounds and a similar number of pups."

In 1902 Edwin dispersed his kennels and moved with his wife Helen to Hastings in Sussex. He died there in 1929. His obituary was in The Times.

== The Hodgson family ==
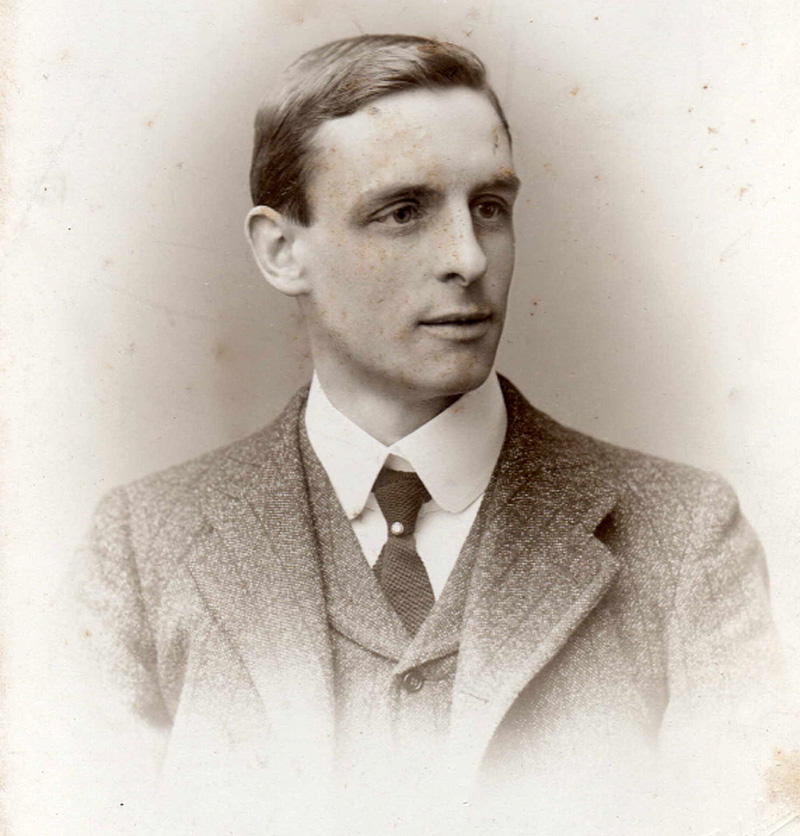
Malcolm Elliot Hodgson

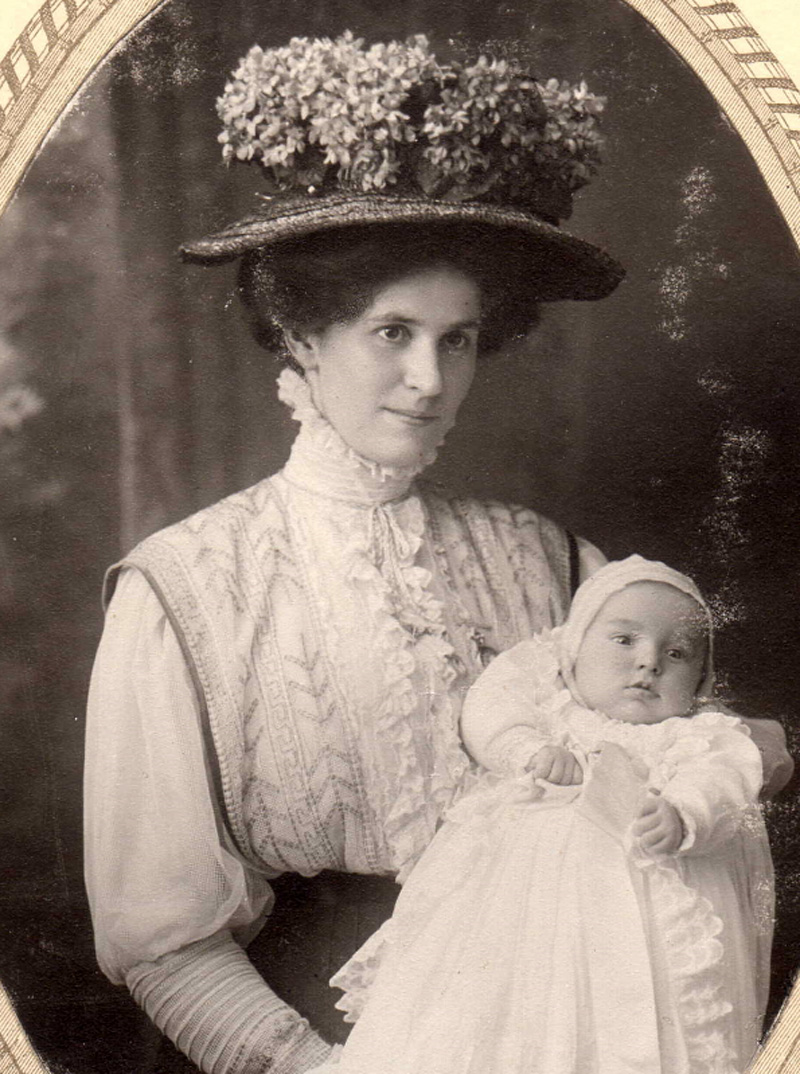
Mary Gwendolen Hodgson, wife of Malcolm Hodgson

After the Broughs left the house was let as a furnished residence for the next sixteen years. Then in 1918 it was advertised for sale and bought by the Hodgson family who remained there for the next twenty years.

Malcolm Elliot Hodgson (1877–1963) was born in 1877 in Shipley, West Yorkshire. His father was John Hodgson of Nocton Hall in Lincolnshire. He became an engineer but when his father died in 1902 he inherited a substantial amount of money and some years later he retired. In 1904 he married Mary Gwendolen Elizabeth Mitchell who was the daughter of Thomas Mitchell of Upwood near Bingley. Her grandfather, Henry Illingworth, was the founder with his brother Alfred Illingworth of Whetley Mills, one of the largest textile factories in Bradford. The couple had two sons.

In 1919 they bought Scalby Manor and brought up their two sons Christopher and Peter. Their eldest son Christopher in 1934 married Helen Amy Blunt the daughter of Alfred Blunt, the Bishop of Bradford. The wedding was widely reported in the newspapers.

In 1939 the Hodgsons sold Scalby Manor to the Scarborough Borough Council and moved to Yew Court in Scalby. It was used as a guest house and then became a hotel. Today it is a restaurant and a pub.
