= Martha Tabram =

Whitechapel murder victim (1849–1888)

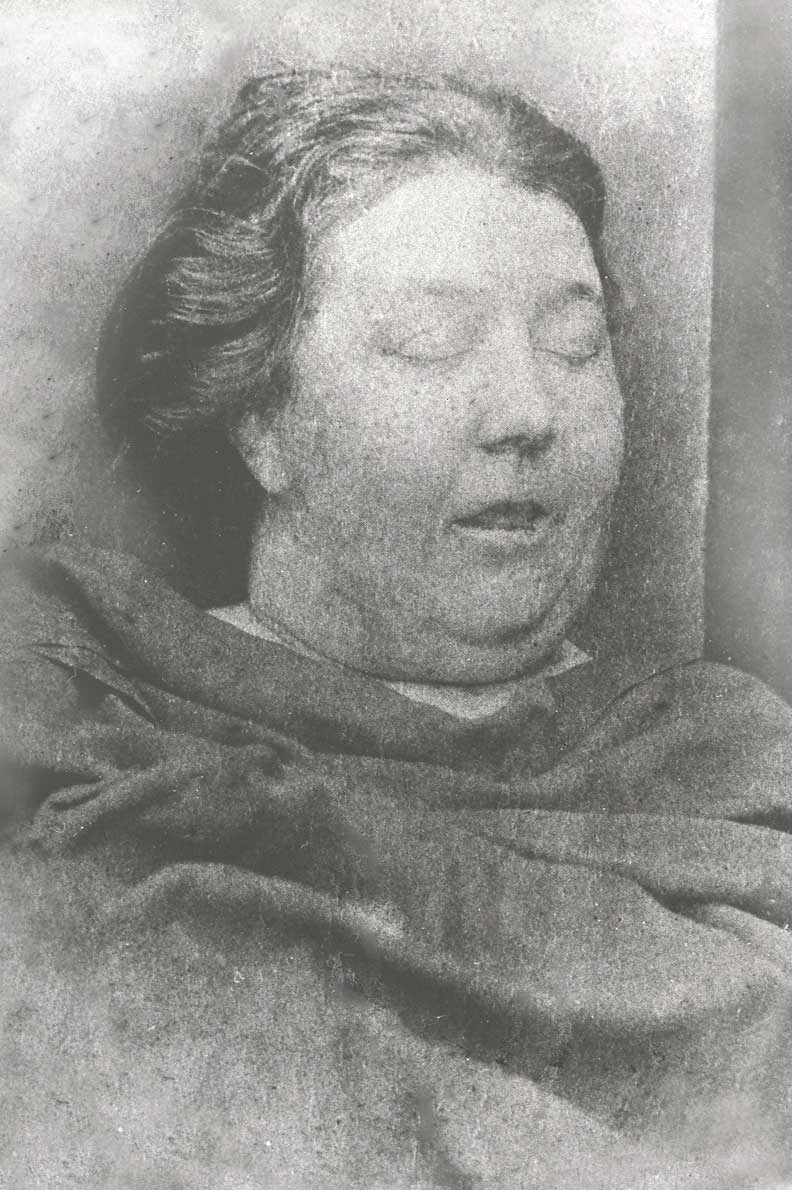
- Mortuary photograph of Martha Tabram
- Born: Martha White; 10 May 1849; Southwark, London, England
- Died: 7 August 1888 (aged 39); Whitechapel, London, England
- Cause of death: Multiple stab wounds to the body, including vital organs such as the heart
- Body discovered: George Yard, Whitechapel; 51.51617°N 0.07092°W
- Occupation: Prostitute
- Known for: Victim of the Whitechapel murders
- Spouse: Henry Tabram (m. 1869)
- Children: 2
- Parent(s): Charles Samuel White; Elisabeth White (née Dowsett)

Martha Tabram (née White; 10 May 1849 – 7 August 1888) was an English woman murdered during a spate of violent attacks in and around the Whitechapel district of East London between 1888 and 1891. She may have been the first victim of the unidentified serial killer "Jack the Ripper".

Although not one of the canonical five Ripper victims broadly acknowledged by historians, she is widely regarded as the next most likely candidate.

== Early life ==
Martha White was born on 10 May 1849 in Southwark, London. She was the youngest of five children of Charles Samuel White, a warehouseman, and his wife, Elisabeth Dowsett. Her older siblings, in order of birth, were Henry, Stephen, Esther, and Mary Ann. She was 5 feet 3 inches (160 cm) tall and had dark hair.

In May 1865, Martha's parents separated. Six months later, her father died of natural causes at the age of 59; according to Mary Ann, he had been unable to work for several months before his death.

== Marriage ==
On Christmas Day 1869, Martha married Henry Samuel Tabram, a foreman furniture packer. The service was conducted at Trinity Church in St. Mary's Parish, Newington. In 1871, the couple moved to a house close to Martha's childhood home. They had two sons: Frederick John Tabram (born February 1871) and Charles Henry Tabram (born December 1872).

Because of Martha's drinking, which was heavy enough to cause alcoholic fits, the Tabrams' marriage was troubled. Henry left her in 1875. For about three years he paid her an allowance of 12 shillings a week, but reduced this to two shillings and sixpence when he learned she was living with another man.

Martha lived on and off with Henry Turner, a carpenter, from about 1876 until three weeks before her death. This relationship was also troubled by her drinking and by her occasionally staying out all night. She and her sons were listed as overnight inmates at the Whitechapel Union workhouse's casual ward at Thomas Street on the census night of 1881. By 1888, Turner was out of regular employment, and the couple earned income by selling trinkets and other small articles on the streets while lodging for about four months at 4 Star Place, off Commercial Road in Whitechapel. Around the beginning of July, they left abruptly, owing rent, and separated for the final time about the middle of that month. Martha moved to a common lodging house at 19 George Street, Spitalfields. By the time of her death, her economic situation had become so desperate that she was forced to trade sex for money on the streets.

== 6 August 1888 ==
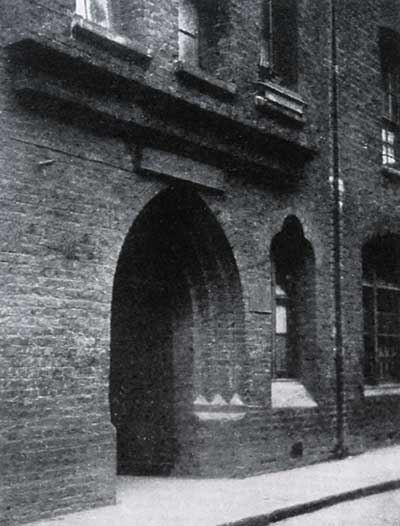
George Yard. The body of Martha Tabram was discovered at this location on 7 August 1888

On 6 August 1888, the night before her murder, Tabram was drinking ale and rum with another woman, and sometime prostitute, Mary Ann Connelly, known as "Pearly Poll", and two soldiers in a public house, the Angel and Crown, close to George Yard Buildings. The four of them paired off, left the public house, and separated at approximately 11:45 pm, each woman with her own client. Tabram and her client went to George Yard, a narrow north–south alley connecting Wentworth Street and Whitechapel High Street, entered from Whitechapel High Street by a covered archway next to The White Hart Inn. George Yard Buildings, a block of tenement flats built in 1876, stood on the western side of the alley near the northern end, to the rear of Toynbee Hall. (Note: This location is now named Gunthorpe Street. Residential flats stand on the site of George Yard Buildings) Pearly Poll and her client went to the parallel Angel Alley.

=== Murder ===
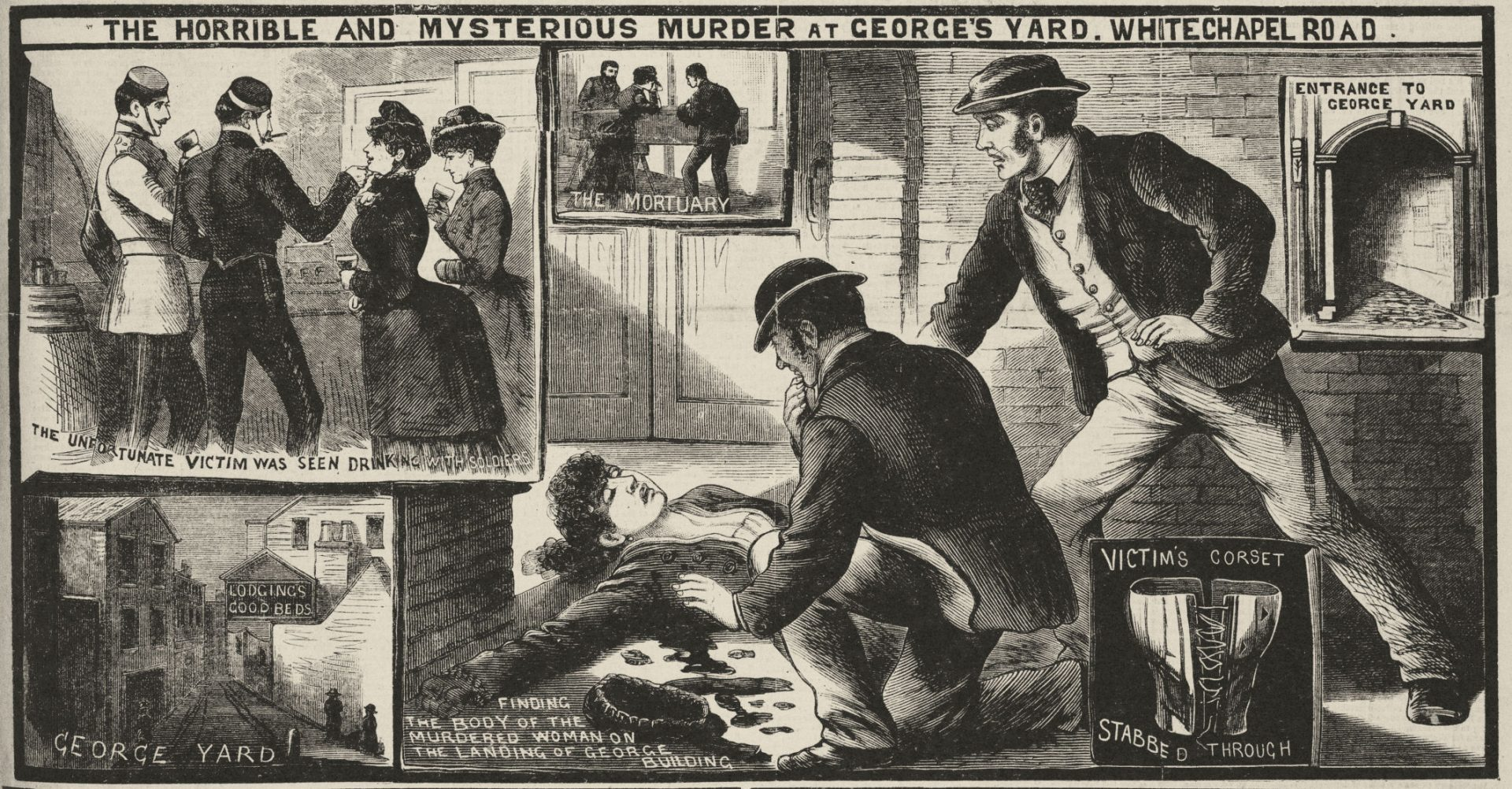
Illustrated Police News sketch of the discovery of the body of Martha Tabram in George Yard

In the early hours of the following morning, a resident of the Buildings, Mrs. Hewitt, was awoken by cries of "Murder!", but domestic violence and shouts of that nature were common in the area and she ignored the noise. At 2:00 am, two other residents, husband and wife Joseph and Elizabeth Mahoney, returned to the Buildings and saw no one on the stairs. At the same time, the patrolling beat officer, PC Thomas Barrett, questioned a grenadier loitering nearby, who replied that he was waiting for a friend. At 3:30 am, resident Albert George Crow returned home after a night's work as a cab driver and noticed Tabram's body lying on a landing above the first flight of stairs. The landing was so dimly lit that he mistook her for a sleeping vagrant, and it was not until just before 5:00 am that another resident, dock labourer John Saunders Reeves, realised she was dead.

Reeves fetched Barrett, who sent for Dr. Timothy Robert Killeen to examine the body. Killeen arrived at about 5:30 am and estimated that Tabram had been dead for around three hours. She had been stabbed 39 times in the body and neck, including wounds to the throat, lungs, heart, liver, spleen, stomach, lower abdomen, and genitals. She was lying on her back with her clothing raised to her middle, suggesting a sexualised position, although Killeen found no evidence of intercourse. The testimony of the residents and Dr Killeen indicated that Tabram was killed between 2:00 am and 3:30 am. (Note: The time of Tabram's murder, at least two hours after leaving the public house with her soldier client, would have allowed sufficient time for Tabram to solicit another client) No one reported seeing or hearing anything unusual during that period.

== Investigation ==
The local inspector of the Metropolitan Police Force, Edmund Reid of H Division Whitechapel, was in charge of the investigation. He arranged for PC Barrett to visit the Tower of London on 7 August in the hope that he could identify the man he had seen standing in the street, but Barrett did not recognise any of the men. A parade of all the soldiers on leave on the night of the murder was held at the Tower on 8 August, and this time Barrett picked out a man. When asked to re-examine his choice, he selected another, and the first was allowed to leave. Barrett explained his change of mind by stating that the man he had seen in George Yard had no medals, whereas the man he had initially selected did. Barrett's second choice, John Leary, claimed that on the night of the murder he had gone drinking in Brixton with a friend, Private Law. According to Leary, they had missed each other at closing time, and he had gone for a walk before meeting Law in the Strand at about 4:30 am, whereupon they had another drink in Billingsgate before returning to the Tower. Law was interviewed separately, and his account matched Leary's. On the strength of their corroborating statements, and because of Barrett's uncertain identification, Leary and Law were dismissed from the inquiry. Another soldier from the Tower, Corporal Benjamin, who was absent without leave, was also dismissed from the investigation after it was established that he had been visiting his father in Kingston-upon-Thames.

Connelly was not wholly cooperative with police and hid with a cousin for a time near Drury Lane, not coming forward until 9 August. She missed an identity parade arranged at the Tower for 10 August, but attended the rescheduled one on the 13th. Connelly failed to recognise the clients and claimed that the men that night had worn white cap-bands. As such bands were worn only by the Coldstream Guards, rather than the Grenadier Guards stationed at the Tower, she was taken to another identity parade at Wellington Barracks on the 15th, where she picked out two soldiers, but both had solid alibis. One had been at home with his wife, while the other had been in the barracks.

Tabram's body was formally identified by her estranged husband on 14 August. At the time of her death, she was wearing a black bonnet, a long black jacket, a dark green skirt, a brown petticoat and stockings, and spring-sided boots showing considerable wear. She was 5 feet 3 inches (1.60 m) tall and had dark hair. The inquest into her death was concluded by deputy coroner for South-East Middlesex George Collier on 23 August at the Working Lad's Institute, Whitechapel Road, with a verdict of murder by person or persons unknown. No suspect was ever arrested for Tabram's murder.

== Jack the Ripper ==
Contemporary newspaper reports published at the beginning of September linked Tabram's murder to those of Emma Elizabeth Smith on 3 April and Mary Ann Nichols on 31 August, though before she died Smith had told the police that a gang had attacked her. The later killings of Annie Chapman on 8 September, Elizabeth Stride and Catherine Eddowes on 30 September, Mary Jane Kelly on 9 November were also linked at the time to Tabram's. The last five murders mentioned are now generally referred to as the "canonical five" victims of Jack the Ripper. All were knife murders of impoverished women in the Whitechapel and Spitalfields districts, generally perpetrated in darkness in the small hours of the morning, in a secluded site accessible to the public, and occurring on or close to a weekend or holiday. (Note: Tabram's murder occurred in the early hours of 7 August. 6 August was a bank holiday)

The police did not connect Tabram's murder with Smith's, but they did connect Tabram's death with the later five murders. Later students of the Ripper murders have largely excluded Tabram from the list of Ripper victims, chiefly because her throat was not cut in the manner of later victims, nor was she eviscerated. This view was advanced by Sir Melville Macnaghten, Assistant Chief Constable of the Metropolitan Police Service Criminal Investigation Department, who implied in an 1894 memorandum that Tabram had been murdered by an unidentified soldier or soldiers. Dr Killeen, who performed the post‑mortem examination, strengthened this belief with his opinion that two weapons were used: one of Tabram's wounds, which penetrated the chest bone, had been inflicted with a longer and stouter weapon, such as a dagger or possibly a bayonet, while the others were made with a shorter, slimmer knife.

Several 20th-century psychological reports have assumed Mary Ann Nichols to have been Jack the Ripper's first victim, but add that her murder was unlikely to have been his first attack. Some have suggested that the Ripper may have murdered Tabram before perfecting his modus operandi of overpowering his victims and cutting their throats. Other researchers, however, such as Philip Sugden in The Complete History of Jack the Ripper and Sean Day in Peter Underwood's Jack the Ripper: One Hundred Years of Mystery, consider Tabram a probable Ripper victim.

Macnaghten was only actively involved in the Whitechapel murders investigation between 1889 and 1891; thus, his notes reflect only the opinions of some police officers at the time and include several factual errors in the information presented about possible suspects. Serial killers have been known to change their murder weapons, and especially to develop their modus operandi over time, as the Ripper did with increasingly severe mutilations. While the five canonical Ripper murders were located roughly north, south, east, and west of Whitechapel, Tabram's murder occurred close to their geographic centre. It is possible that her murder was one of the first committed by the Ripper before he had settled on his later modus operandi.

In 1998, an Australian researcher, Ted Linn, published a booklet called The Case of the Redhanded Copycat, in which he outlined his case that Martha's husband, Henry Samuel Tabram, was the real Ripper. He bases this claim on cryptographic clues he believed he had found in letters attributed to the Ripper, along with other evidence.

== See also ==
- Cold case
- List of serial killers before 1900
- Unsolved murders in the United Kingdom
