= Henry Moore (police officer) =

British police officer (1848–1918)

Henry Moore (2 June 1848 – 17 November 1918) was a British policeman from Northamptonshire. He joined the London Metropolitan Police Service on 26 April 1869, was promoted to Sergeant on 29 August 1872, and became an Inspector on 25 August 1878. On 30 April 1888, he joined the Criminal Investigation Department at Scotland Yard.

In September 1888, he was seconded from Scotland Yard to Whitechapel to strengthen the investigation into the Whitechapel murders, which were blamed on a character known as "Jack the Ripper", shortly after Mary Ann Nichols's murder case. By July 1889, he had taken over from Inspector Frederick Abberline as the lead investigative officer in the case. He remained the lead detective until 1896, by which time the murderer, who was never caught, appeared to be inactive.

He was promoted to Inspector 1st class on 22 December 1890, and to Chief Inspector on 27 September 1895. After his retirement from the Metropolitan force on 9 October 1899, he worked for the Great Eastern Railway police at the rank of Superintendent, until his second retirement in 1913.

On 17 November 1918, Henry Moore suffered a stroke and died at the age of seventy, at Southend-on-Sea.

== Bibliography ==
- Evans, Stewart P.; Skinner, Keith (2000). The Ultimate Jack the Ripper Sourcebook: An Illustrated Encyclopedia. London: Constable and Robinson. ISBN 1-84119-225-2.
- Adams, Danny (2018). The College Farm Mystery: The True Story of the Finchley Murder of 1898. ISBN 978-1791690601.
