= Emma Elizabeth Smith =

Whitechapel murder victim

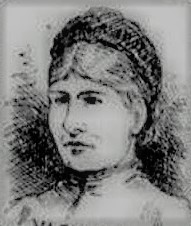
- Contemporary illustration of Smith
- Born: c. 1843
- Died: 4 April 1888 (aged 45); Whitechapel, London, England
- Occupation: Prostitute
- Known for: Suspected victim of Jack the Ripper

Emma Elizabeth Smith (c. 1843 – 4 April 1888) was a woman of uncertain origins who was murdered in late‑19th-century London. Her killing was the first of the Whitechapel murders. Although it has been suggested that she may have been an early victim of the serial killer known as "Jack the Ripper", most modern authors consider this unlikely.

== Life ==
Smith's life prior to her murder in 1888 remains obscure. Police files were compiled during the investigation, but most are now missing, apparently taken, mislaid, or discarded from the Metropolitan Police archive before the transfer of papers to the Public Record Office. In the surviving material, Inspector Edmund Reid recorded that she had a "son and daughter living in the Finsbury Park area". Walter Dew, then a detective constable with H Division, later wrote:

Her past was a closed book even to her intimate friends. All she had ever told anyone about herself was that she was a widow who more than ten years before had left her husband and broken away from all her early associations.

There was something about Emma Smith which suggested that there had been a time when the comforts of life had not been denied her. There was a touch of culture in her speech, unusual in her class.

Once when Emma was asked why she had broken away so completely from her old life she replied, a little wistfully: "They would not understand now any more than they understood then. I must live somehow."

At the time of her death in 1888, Smith had been living in a lodging-house at 18 George Street (now Lolesworth Street), Spitalfields, in London's East End for approximately eighteen months, paying 4d for a bed.

== Murder ==
Prior to being fatally assaulted, Smith was last seen by 54-year-old fellow resident Margaret Hayes, at 18 George Street at approximately 12:15 a.m., Tuesday, 3 April 1888, the day after the Easter Monday bank holiday. According to Hayes, Smith had been standing near Farrant Street, talking with a man dressed in dark clothing and a white scarf. She is believed to have been attacked at the junction of Osborn Street and Brick Lane, Whitechapel, approximately seventy-five minutes later. The location of the assault was about 300 yards from her lodging house. Although injured, she survived the attack and managed to walk back to the lodging house.

Upon her return, Smith told the deputy keeper, Mary Russell, that she had been attacked by two or three men, one of whom was a teenager. Russell and another lodger, Annie Lee, took her to the London Hospital, where she was treated by the house surgeon George Haslip. She fell into a coma and developed peritonitis; she died at 9 am the following day. A medical examination by the duty surgeon, Dr G. H. Hillier, revealed that a blunt object had been inserted into her vagina, rupturing the peritoneum. The police were not informed of the incident until 6 April, when they were told that an inquest was to be held the following day. The inquest, conducted at the hospital by the coroner for East Middlesex, Wynne Edwin Baxter, was attended by Russell, Hillier, and the local chief inspector of the Metropolitan Police Service, H Division Whitechapel, John West. The jury returned a verdict of murder by person or persons unknown.

Chief Inspector West placed the investigation in the hands of Inspector Edmund Reid of H Division. Reid noted in his report that her clothing was "in such dirty ragged condition that it was impossible to tell if any part of it had been fresh torn". Walter Dew later described the investigation:

As in every case of murder in this country, however poor and friendless the victims might be, the police made every effort to track down Emma Smith's assailant. Unlikely as well as likely places were searched for clues. Hundreds of people were interrogated. Scores of statements were taken. Soldiers from the Tower of London [which stood within H Division] were questioned as to their movements. Ships in docks were searched and sailors questioned.

Smith had not provided descriptions of the men who attacked her, and no witnesses came forward or were found. The investigation proved fruitless, and the murderer or murderers were never caught.

== Whitechapel murders ==
The case was listed as the first of eleven Whitechapel murders in Metropolitan Police files. Although some sections of the press linked her death to the later murders attributed to a single serial killer known as "Jack the Ripper", her murder is unlikely to have been connected with those killings. With the exception of Walter Dew, who later wrote that he believed Smith was the Ripper's first victim, the police suspected that her murder was the unrelated work of a criminal gang. Smith either refused to, or could not, describe her attackers in any detail, possibly because she feared reprisal. Prostitutes were often controlled by gangs, and Smith may have been attacked by her pimps as punishment for disobedience, or as part of their intimidation.

== Bibliography ==
- Begg, Paul (2003). Jack the Ripper: The Definitive History. London: Pearson Education. ISBN 0-582-50631-X
- Connell, Nicholas (2005). Walter Dew: The Man Who Caught Crippen. Stroud, Gloucestershire: The History Press. ISBN 978-0-7509-3803-7
- Cook, Andrew (2009). Jack the Ripper. Stroud, Gloucestershire: Amberley Publishing. ISBN 978-1-84868-327-3
- Evans, Stewart P.; Rumbelow, Donald (2006). Jack the Ripper: Scotland Yard Investigates. Stroud: Sutton. ISBN 0-7509-4228-2
- Evans, Stewart P.; Skinner, Keith (2000). The Ultimate Jack the Ripper Sourcebook: An Illustrated Encyclopedia. London: Constable and Robinson. ISBN 1-84119-225-2
- Honeycombe, Gordon (1982). The Murders of the Black Museum: 1870-1970, London: Bloomsbury Books, ISBN 978-0-863-79040-9
- Marriott, Trevor (2005). Jack the Ripper: The 21st Century Investigation. London: John Blake. ISBN 1-84454-103-7
- Rumbelow, Donald (2004). The Complete Jack the Ripper: Fully Revised and Updated. Penguin Books. ISBN 0-14-017395-1
