= Mitre Square =

Small square in the City of London, England

Coordinates: 51.5138°N 0.078°W

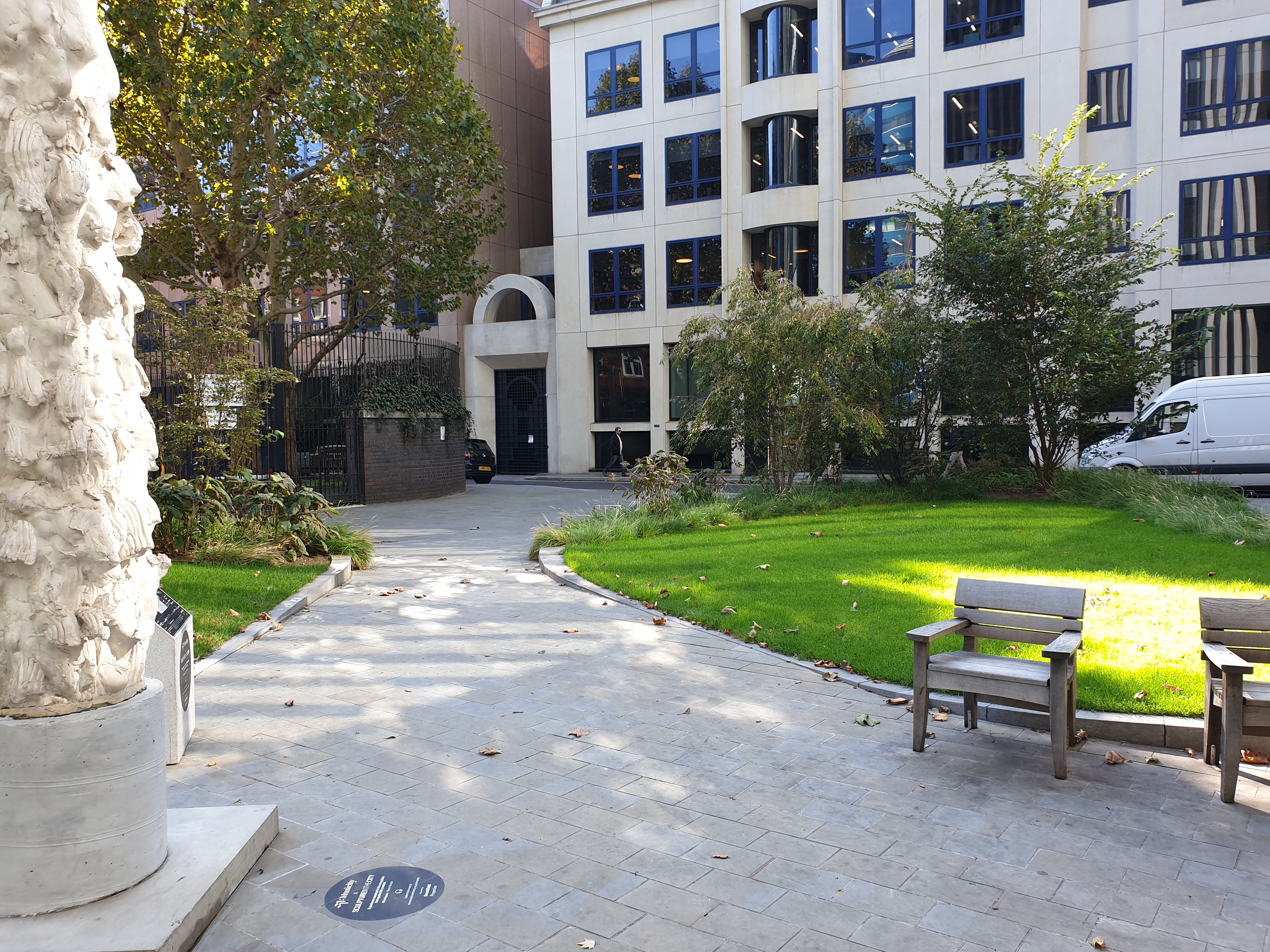
Mitre Square in 2019

Mitre Square is a small square located in Aldgate inside the City of London. It measures about 77 feet (23 m) by 80 feet (24 m) and is connected via three passages with Mitre Street to the south west, to Creechurch Place to the north west and, via St James's Passage (formerly Church Passage), to Duke's Place to the north east.

== History ==
The square occupies the site of the cloister of Holy Trinity Priory, Aldgate which was demolished under Henry VIII at the time of the Dissolution of the Monasteries. The south corner of the square was the site of the murder of Catherine Eddowes by Jack the Ripper. Her mutilated body was found there at 1:44 in the morning on 30 September 1888. This was the westernmost of the Whitechapel murders and the only one located within the City of London.

Eddowes' murder on the site of the old monastery is ascribed to an ancient curse in a contemporary penny dreadful entitled The Curse Upon Mitre Square A.D. 1530–1888 by J.F. Brewer.

== One Mitre Square ==
A 19-storey, 79m-high office development is proposed for the square, known as One Mitre Square.

== Image gallery ==
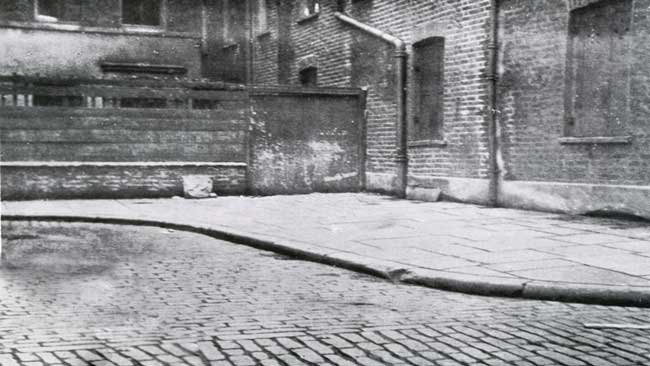
1938 photograph of Mitre Square. The body of Catherine Eddowes was discovered close to the fence seen at the centre of this image on 30 September 1888

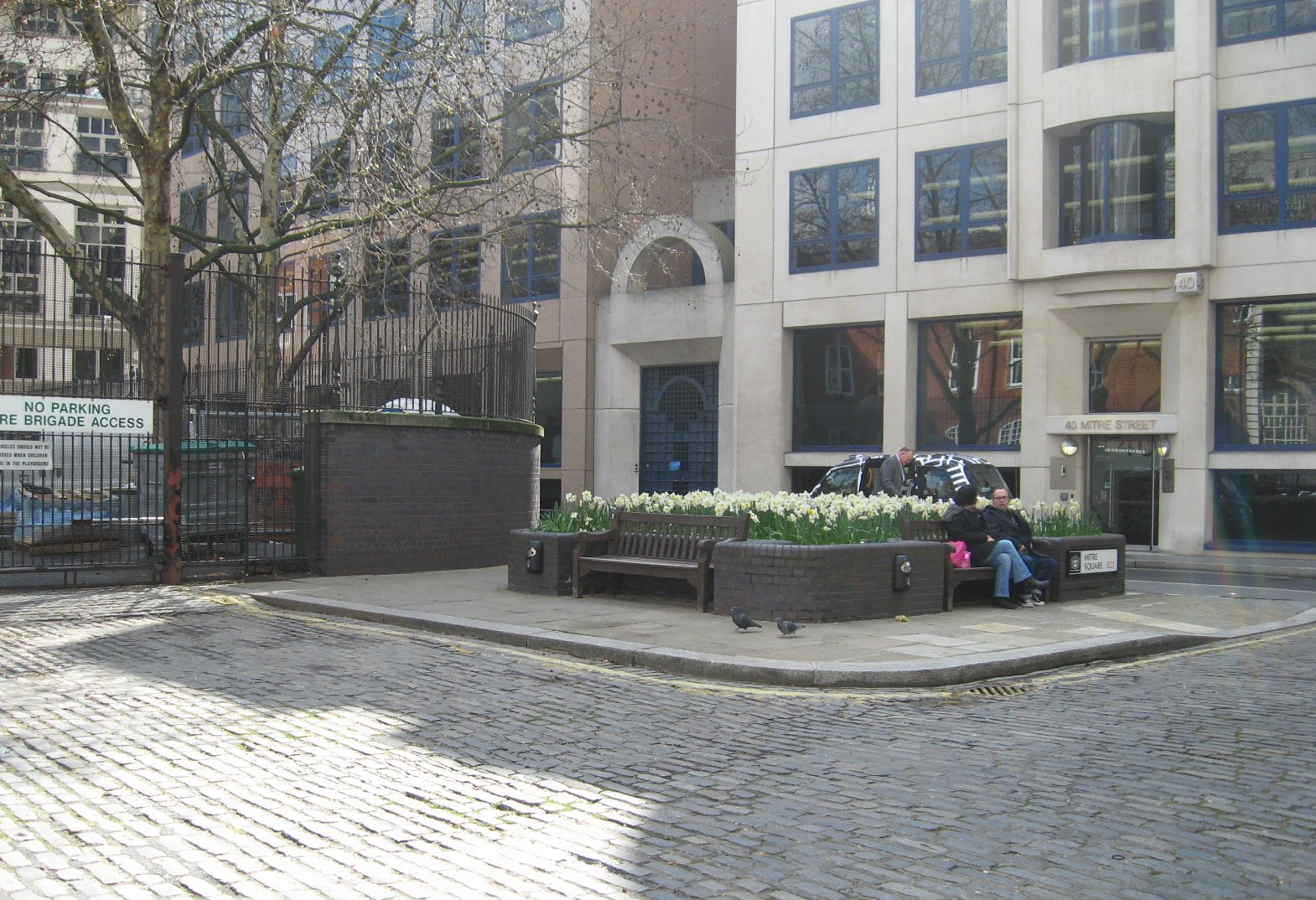
'Ripper's Corner' in Mitre Square, scene of Eddowes' murder.

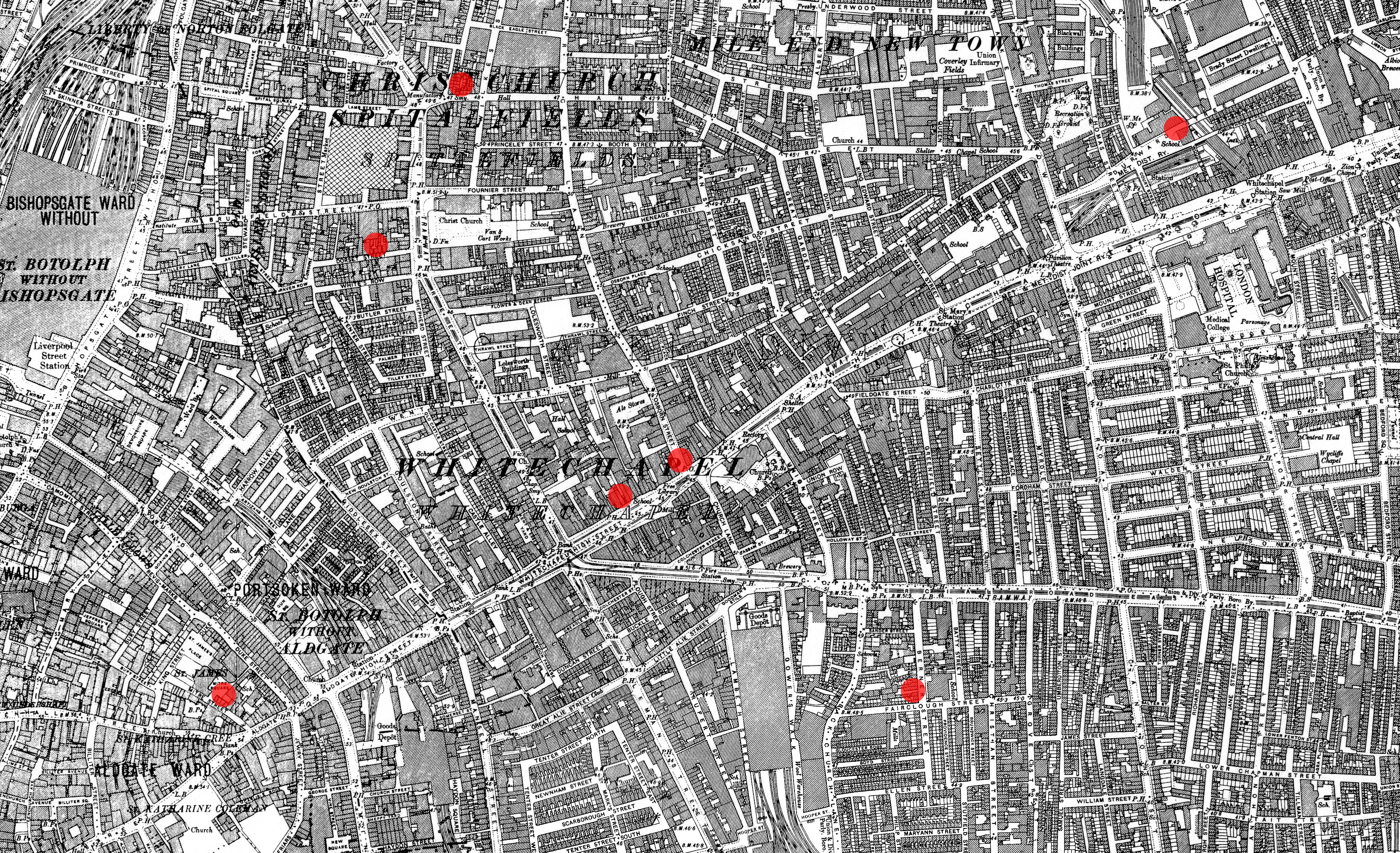
The Whitechapel murders – Mitre Square is the red dot to the bottom left corner.

Mitre Square, viewed from near the site of the Eddowes murder.

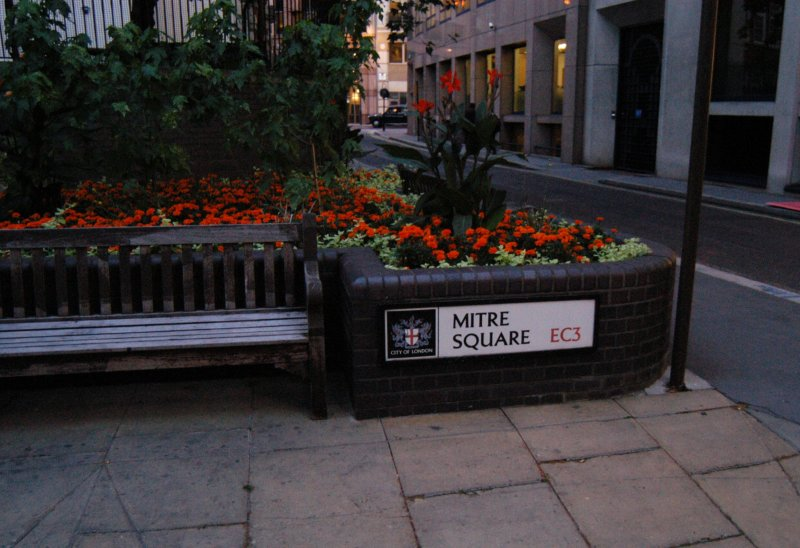
Mitre Square, 2006.
