= Elizabeth Stride =

Whitechapel murder victim (1843–1888)

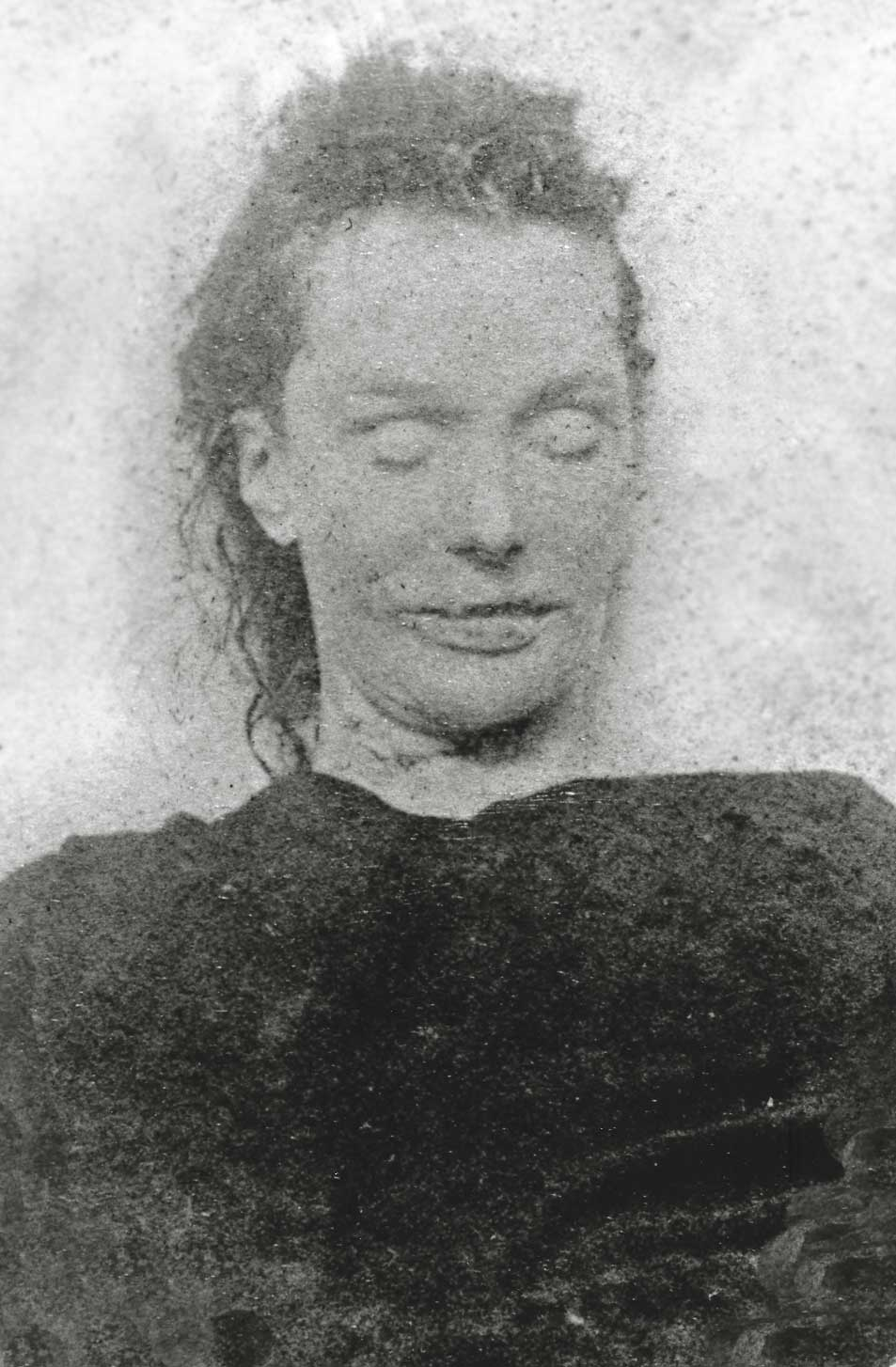
- Mortuary photograph of Stride, 1888
- Born: Elisabeth Gustafsdotter; 27 November 1843; Torslanda, Sweden
- Died: 30 September 1888 (aged 44); Whitechapel, London, England
- Cause of death: Haemorrhage due to partial severance of the left carotid artery; severance of trachea
- Body discovered: Dutfield's Yard, Berner Street (now known as Henriques Street), Whitechapel, London; 51.5137°N 0.0655°W
- Resting place: East London Cemetery, West Ham, England; 51.526658°N 0.012057°E (approximate)
- Occupations: Cleaner, prostitute
- Known for: Third canonical victim of Jack the Ripper
- Spouse: John Thomas Stride (m. 1869; sep. 1881)

Elizabeth "Long Liz" Stride (née Gustafsdotter; 27 November 1843 – 30 September 1888) is believed to have been the third victim of the unidentified serial killer known as Jack the Ripper, who killed and mutilated at least five women in the Whitechapel and Spitalfields districts of London from late August to early November 1888.

Unlike the other four canonical Ripper victims, Stride had not been mutilated following her murder, leading some historians to suspect she had not been killed by Jack the Ripper. However, Stride's murder occurred less than one hour before the murder of the Ripper's fourth canonical victim, Catherine Eddowes, within walking distance, and her act of murder is suspected to have been disturbed by an individual entering the crime scene on a two-wheeled cart. In addition, both women had been murdered by slash wounds to the throat, leading most authors and researchers to consider Stride the third of the Ripper's canonical five victims.

Stride was nicknamed "Long Liz". Several explanations have been given for this pseudonym. Some believe it derives from her married surname (a stride being a reference to a long step), while others believe this is a reference to either her height, or her general facial structure.

== Early life ==
Stride was born Elisabeth Gustafsdotter on 27 November 1843 on a small farm near Stora Tumlehed, a rural village within the parish of Torslanda, west of Gothenburg, Sweden. She was the second of four children born to Gustaf Ericsson and his wife, Beata Carlsdotter. As a child, she lived on the family farm. All four children were raised in the Lutheran faith, and all were required to perform numerous chores on the farm.

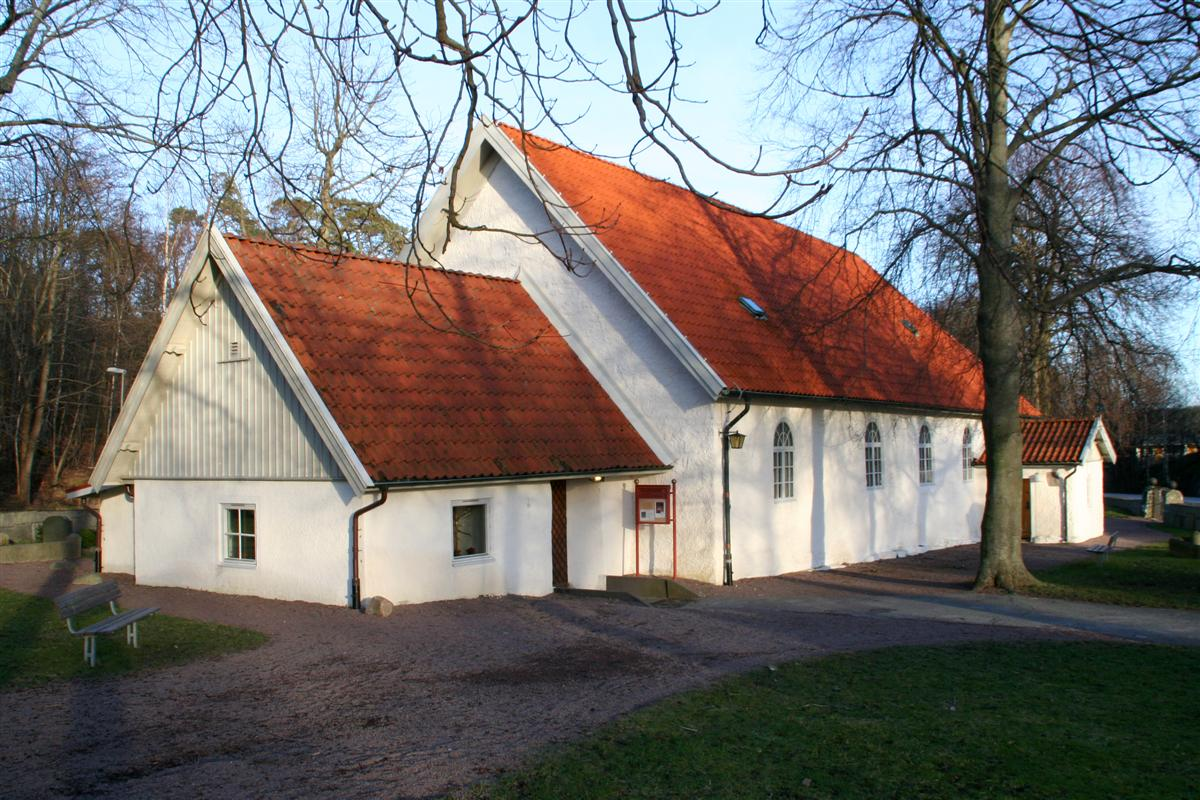
The Church of Torslanda. Gustafsdotter was confirmed at this church in 1859.

Gustafsdotter was confirmed at the Church of Torslanda on 14 August 1859 at the age of 15. Contemporary records describe her biblical knowledge as thorough. The following year, she relocated from Stora Tumlehed to Gothenburg in search of employment. She soon obtained work as a domestic servant in the Gothenburg parish of Carl Johan, employed by a couple named Olofsson. This position lasted until 2 February 1864, after which she moved to another district of Gothenburg and again secured work as a domestic servant. She was between 5 ft 2 in (1.57 m) and 5 ft 5 in (1.65 m) in height and had curly dark brown hair, light grey eyes, an oval face, and a pale complexion.

Unlike the other canonical victims of the Whitechapel murders, at least three of whom resorted to prostitution after failed marriages, Stride turned to prostitution earlier in life. Gothenburg police records from March 1865 confirm her arrest on this charge. She was treated at least twice for venereal disease. On 21 April 1865, she gave birth to a stillborn girl. Seven months later, she obtained work as a maid in the district of Haga.

== Relocation to London ==
In February 1866, Gustafsdotter moved from Gothenburg to London. Her actual reason for leaving Sweden is unknown, as she is known to have told acquaintances two differing stories. To some, Gustafsdotter claimed she had relocated to England via her employment in the domestic service of "a gentleman" who lived near Hyde Park; to others, she claimed she had family in London and chose to visit relatives in the city before deciding to remain in England. She likely funded the journey with the 65 kronor she inherited following her mother's death in August 1864, which she received in late 1865.

Upon arriving in London, Gustafsdotter learned to speak English and Yiddish in addition to her native language. She is also known to have briefly dated a policeman in the late 1860s.

== Marriage ==
On 7 March 1869, Gustafsdotter married John Thomas Stride, a ship's carpenter from Sheerness who was 22 years her senior. They married at St Giles in the Fields Church. The couple had no children. (Note: In her later years, Stride told many people she had borne nine children to John Stride. However, no official records exist of Stride giving birth to any children beyond her stillborn daughter in 1866.)

For several years, the couple lived on East India Dock Road and operated a coffee shop in Poplar. The business was first located on Upper North Road before relocating to Poplar High Street in approximately 1871. Their income was supplemented by John's continued work as a carpenter.

By 1874, the Strides' marriage had begun to deteriorate, although they continued to live together. The following year, John sold the coffee shop, likely due to financial hardship.

=== Separation ===
In March 1877, Stride was admitted to the Poplar Workhouse, indicating that the couple had separated by this date. Census records from 1881 show they had reunited and were living together in Bow, although they had permanently separated by the end of that year. Stride was admitted to a Whitechapel workhouse infirmary with bronchitis in December 1881. She was discharged on 4 January 1882 and is believed to have taken up residence in common lodging-houses on Flower and Dean Street shortly afterwards. John died of tuberculosis on 24 October 1884 in the Poplar and Stepney Sick Asylum.

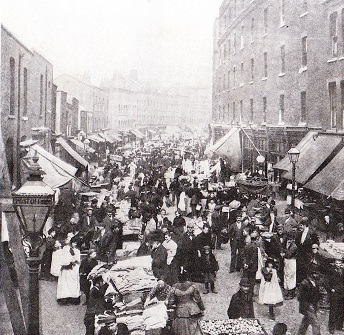
Middlesex Street, Spitalfields, c. 1890. Stride frequently resided in common lodging-houses within this district of London in the years prior to her murder.

In the years after her marriage collapsed and her husband's death, Stride told several people that her husband and two of her nine children had drowned in the 1878 sinking of the Princess Alice in the River Thames. She claimed that she and her husband had been employed on the steamer, that she survived by climbing the ship's mast, and that another survivor kicked her in the mouth as she climbed, injuring her palate and causing a permanent stutter. (Note: Stride is believed to have fabricated this story in an effort to elicit sympathy from those to whom she recounted these claims.)

=== Common lodging residences ===
While living in common lodging-houses, Stride occasionally received charitable assistance from the Church of Sweden in London. From 1885 until her death, she lived much of the time with Michael Kidney, a dock labourer who resided in Devonshire Street. Their relationship was tumultuous, and they regularly separated, with Stride staying in lodging-houses before returning to Kidney. In April 1887, she filed an assault charge against him, although she did not pursue the case in court. As such, the case was discharged. Their relationship continued on and off between 1885 and 1888. (Note: Kidney later testified at the inquest into Stride's murder that, in the three years of their relationship, the couple had been separated for a combined total of approximately five months.)

In addition to prostitution, Stride occasionally earned income from sewing and housecleaning. An acquaintance described her as having a calm temperament, although she appeared before the Thames Magistrates' Court on about eight occasions for both drunk and disorderly conduct and the use of obscene language, the last being on 3 September 1888. She occasionally used the alias Annie Fitzgerald at these hearings.

== 1888 ==
Following an argument on 26 September 1888, Stride and Kidney again separated, and she again took residence at 32 Flower and Dean Street, then a notorious slum and criminal rookery. She informed a fellow lodger, Catherine Lane, that she and Kidney "had had a few words". Over the following days, she regularly earned money by performing cleaning duties both at the lodging house and for local residents. The housekeeper, Elizabeth Tanner, described her as a quiet woman who occasionally performed cleaning work for the local Jewish community. (Note: A leading social reformer named Dr Thomas Barnardo would later claim to have encountered Stride on Wednesday 26 September at this Spitalfields common lodging-house. According to Dr Barnardo, Stride had been sat in the kitchen with several women—one of whom had been weeping—and discussing the Whitechapel murders. Dr Barnardo would later recollect one of these women had stated: "We're all up to no good! No one cares about us! Perhaps some of us will be killed next!")

=== 29 September ===
On the day prior to her murder, Stride cleaned two rooms at her lodging house and was paid sixpence. That evening, she wore a black jacket and skirt, with a posy of a red rose in a spray of either maidenhair fern or asparagus leaves. She also wore a black crêpe bonnet. In an effort to make her clothing look more respectable, she borrowed a brush from a fellow resident. At 6:30 pm, Stride and Tanner briefly visited the Queen's Head pub on Commercial Street before Stride returned alone to the lodging house.

Eyewitness accounts of Stride's movements later on 29 September and into the early hours of 30 September suggest she may have been in the company of one or more acquaintances or clients. The first of these men was described as short, with a dark moustache, wearing a morning suit and bowler hat. He was seen with her at about 11:00 pm near Berner Street. A second account, given by labourer William Marshall, places Stride with a man wearing a peaked cap, black coat and dark trousers. They stood on the pavement opposite number 58 Berner Street at about 11:45 pm. Marshall described the man as "decently dressed". He stated that the pair repeatedly kissed before the man said to her: "You would say anything but your prayers."

=== 30 September ===
At 12:35 am, PC William Smith saw Stride with a man wearing a hard felt hat standing opposite the International Working Men's Educational Club, a socialist and predominantly Jewish social club at 40 Berner Street (now Henriques Street). The man was carrying a package about 18 inches (45 cm) long. Smith had no reason to feel suspicious and continued on his beat towards Commercial Road. Between 12:35 am and 12:45 am, dockworker James Brown saw a woman he believed to be Stride standing with her back against a wall at the corner of Berner Street, speaking with a man of average build in a long black coat. Brown heard Stride say, "No. Not tonight. Some other night."

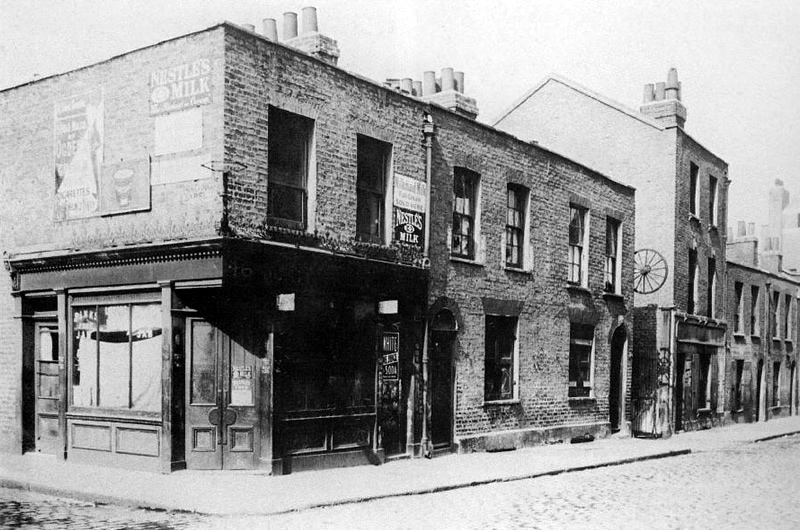
Berner Street, seen here in 1909. The body of Stride was discovered in Dutfield's Yard (visible beneath the suspended cartwheel) on 30 September 1888.

== Murder ==
At about 1:00 am on Sunday 30 September 1888, Stride's body was discovered in the adjacent Dutfield's Yard (Note: Dutfield's Yard was a passageway leading into a courtyard in which several families resided.) by Louis Diemschutz, the steward of the International Working Men's Educational Club. Diemschutz had driven into the poorly lit yard with his horse and two-wheeled cart when the horse abruptly shied to the left to avoid what appeared to be a bundle lying on the ground. Seeing what he later described as a "dark object", Diemschutz attempted to lift it with his whip handle before leaving his cart to inspect it. Upon lighting a match, he saw a prone body. He ran inside the club to check his wife was safe. After finding her safe, he reported his discovery, and the group dispersed to seek help.

Stride's body lay on her left side, with her right hand on her stomach and her left arm extended behind her back. Her left hand still clutched several cachous wrapped in tissue paper, and the bow of her checkered silk scarf had been pulled tightly to the left of her neck, possibly from behind. Blood was still flowing from a single knife wound to her neck. Although her hands were cold, other parts of her body were slightly or "quite" warm. This suggests Stride was killed shortly before Diemschutz arrived in the yard. Several patrons of the Working Men's Educational Club who had left the premises between 12:30 and 12:50 am later informed police they had observed nothing amiss. (Note: On the night of Stride's murder, patrons of the International Working Men's Educational Club attended a debate about the need for Socialism amongst Jews, followed by communal singing.)

== Post-mortem ==
The first doctor to arrive was Frederick William Blackwell. Police surgeon Dr George Bagster Phillips, who had examined the body of previous Whitechapel murder victim Annie Chapman, arrived about 10 minutes later. (Note: Dr George Bagster Phillips and a colleague would later conduct the post-mortem upon the body of subsequent Whitechapel murder victim Mary Jane Kelly.) Phillips's official post-mortem documents state:

The body was lying on the near side, with the face turned toward the wall, the head up the yard and the feet toward the street. The left arm was extended and there was a packet of cachous in the left hand. ... The right arm was over the belly; the back of the hand and wrist had on it clotted blood. The legs were drawn up with the feet close to the wall. The body and face were warm and the hand cold. The legs were quite warm.
The deceased had a silk handkerchief round her neck, and it appeared to be slightly torn. I have since ascertained it was cut. This corresponded with the right angle of the jaw. The throat was deeply gashed, and there was an abrasion of the skin about one and a quarter inches in diameter, apparently stained with blood, under her right brow.
At 3 pm on Monday at St. George's Mortuary, Dr Blackwell and I made a post-mortem examination. Rigor mortis was still thoroughly marked. There was mud on the left side of the face and it was matted in the head. ... The body was fairly nourished. Over both shoulders, especially the right, and under the collarbone and in front of the chest there was a blueish discolouration, which I have watched and have seen on two occasions since.
There was a clear-cut incision on the neck. It was six inches in length and commenced two and a half inches in a straight line below the angle of the jaw, three-quarters of an inch over an undivided muscle, and then, becoming deeper, dividing the sheath. The cut was very clean and deviated a little downwards. The arteries and other vessels contained in the sheath were all cut through. The cut through the tissues on the right side was more superficial and tailed off to about two inches below the right angle of the jaw. The deep vessels on that side were uninjured. From this, it was evident that the haemorrhage was caused through the partial severance of the left carotid artery and a small bladed knife could have been used.
Decomposition had commenced in the skin. Dark brown spots were on the anterior surface of the left chin. There was a deformity in the bones of the right leg, which was not straight but bowed forwards. There was no recent external injury save to the neck.
The body being washed more thoroughly, I could see some healing sores. The lobe of the left ear was torn as if from the removal or wearing through of an earring, but it was thoroughly healed. On removing the scalp there was no sign of bruising or extravasation of blood. ... The heart was small, the left ventricle firmly contracted, and the right slightly so. There was no clot in the pulmonary artery, but the right ventricle was full of dark clot. The left was firmly contracted as to be absolutely empty. The stomach was large and the mucous membrane only congested. It contained partly digested food, apparently consisting of cheese, potato, and farinaceous powder [flour or milled grain]. All the teeth on the lower left jaw were absent.

Blackwell believed Stride's murderer may have pulled her backwards onto the ground by her neckerchief, the bow of which was observed to be markedly tight, before cutting her throat. Phillips concurred, stating that Stride had probably been lying on her back when she was killed by a single, swift slash from left to right across her neck, strongly indicating her murderer had been right-handed. Bruising on Stride's chest suggested she had been pinned to the ground before the wound to her neck was inflicted.

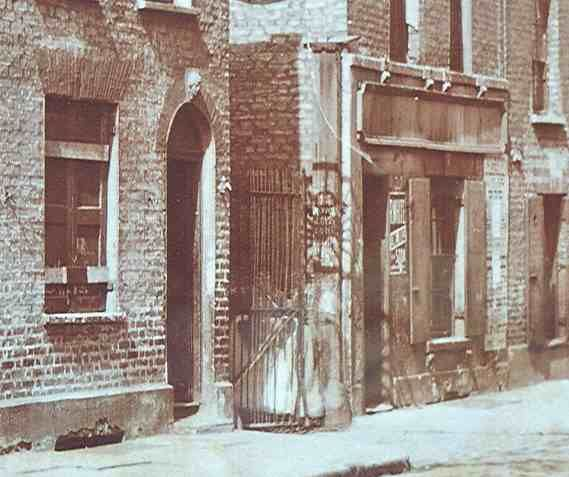
The entrance to Dutfield's Yard. Louis Diemschutz discovered Stride's body at this location at 1:00 am on 30 September 1888

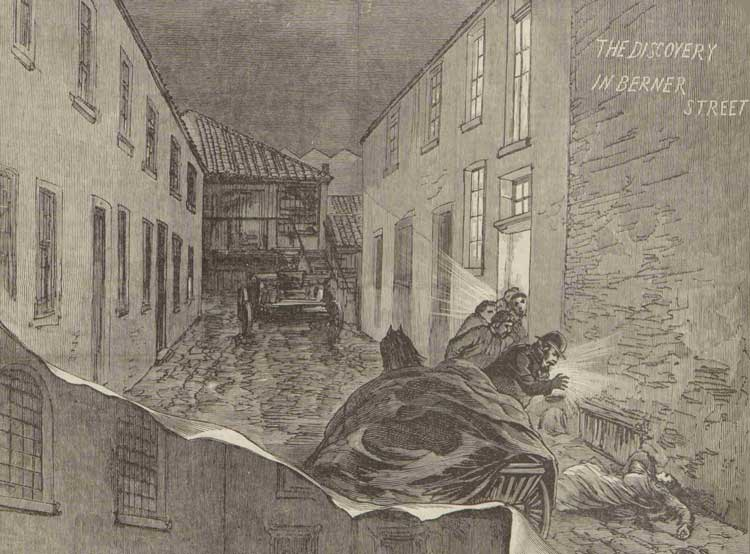
6 October 1888 edition of the Penny Illustrated Paper depicting the discovery of Stride's body

== Investigation ==
Police searched the crime scene and questioned everyone who had been at the International Working Men's Educational Club, as well as all residents of the area.

Israel Schwartz told investigators he had seen Stride being attacked outside Dutfield's Yard at approximately 12:45 am by a man with dark hair, a small brown moustache, and about 5 feet 5 inches in height. According to Schwartz, the man attempted to pull Stride onto the street before turning her around and shoving her to the ground. As Schwartz observed this assault, Stride's assailant shouted the word "Lipski" either to Schwartz or to a second man who had exited the club during the altercation and lit a pipe. (Note: This outburst is believed to be an anti-semitic insult directed at either Schwartz or the unknown individual to exit the club, referencing a convicted murderer of Polish-Jewish heritage by this name who had been executed in 1887 for the poisoning murder of a young woman named Miriam Angel.) Schwartz did not testify at the inquest, possibly because he was of Hungarian descent and spoke very little, if any, English. Ripper investigator Stephen Knight found Schwartz's statement in case files in the 1970s. At about the same time, Stride, or a woman matching her description, was seen by James Brown rejecting the advances of a stoutish man slightly taller than her in Fairclough Street, adjacent to Berner Street. A note in the margin of the Home Office case files states there was sufficient time for Stride to meet another individual between her death and the latest sightings of her.

No money was found on or near Stride's body. This indicated that her money could have been taken during or after the altercation witnessed by Schwartz, or by her murderer if it was not the same person. It appeared she had willingly entered Dutfield's Yard and had either encountered her murderer within or had walked there with the person before being attacked.

Mrs Fanny Mortimer, who lived two doors from the club, had stood in Berner Street listening to the communal singing at about the time Stride was murdered, but had not seen anyone enter the yard or heard anything amiss. Mortimer did see a man with a shiny black bag hurry past, and this was widely reported in the press. One of the club's members, Leon Goldstein, identified himself as the man Mortimer had seen and was soon eliminated from the inquiry.

On 19 October, Chief Inspector Swanson reported that 80,000 leaflets appealing for information had been distributed around Whitechapel. He noted that, among other lines of enquiry, some 2,000 lodgers had been questioned or investigated in relation to Stride's death.

=== Reaction of Michael Kidney ===
On 1 October, a drunken Michael Kidney walked into Leman Street police station and accused the police of incompetence, stating that had he been a policeman on duty in Berner Street during the murder, he would have shot himself.

Kidney has been suspected of being Stride's murderer because of their turbulent relationship and because there is no record of his alibi. However, investigators appear to have eliminated Kidney from their inquiries.

The following year, Whitechapel Workhouse Infirmary records show Kidney visited three times: for syphilis in June 1889; for lumbago in August; and for dyspepsia in October. His declining health and general distress in the year after Stride's murder indicates a detrimental psychological and emotional reaction to her death.

"When you entered [Dutfield's Yard], if any person had run out you would have seen them in the dark?"

"Oh yes, it was light enough for that ... it was dark in the gateway, but not so dark further in the yard."

Middlesex coroner Wynne Edwin Baxter, questioning witness Louis Diemschutz. 1 October 1888.

== Inquest ==
The inquest into Stride's death was opened at the Vestry Hall, Cable Street, St George in the East, on 1 October. It was presided over by the Middlesex coroner, Wynne Edwin Baxter. The first day heard testimony from three witnesses: two patrons of the International Working Men's Educational Club who had been in the premises on the night of the murder, and Louis Diemschutz. The two patrons, William Wess and Morris Eagle, each stated that about 25 to 30 people had been in the club at the time of the discovery, and that they had heard nothing amiss. Wess also stated that Stride's body could not have been in the location where Diemschutz found her when he had left the premises at about 12:15 am. Diemschutz recounted his discovery and told the coroner that the first medical personnel arrived "about twenty minutes" after the police. (Note: Diemschutz is known to have stated his strong conviction that Stride's murderer was still in Dutfield's Yard at the time he had driven into the location.)

The second day heard conflicting testimony as to the identity of the deceased. Although police were certain the woman was Stride, Mrs Mary Malcolm swore the body was that of her married sister, Elizabeth Watts. (Note: This claim of identification was disproved on 24 October when Watts appeared in person at the inquest.) Physician and surgeon Frederick Blackwell said he had been summoned to the crime scene at precisely 1:16 am on 30 September by a policeman, and that Dr Phillips arrived about 20 minutes later. Blackwell testified that blood was still flowing from Stride's neck wound into a gutter and down a drain near her feet, and that he estimated death had occurred "from twenty minutes to half an hour" before his arrival. As the blood vessels on only one side of Stride's neck had been cut, with her carotid artery only partially severed, Blackwell stated her death would have occurred "comparatively slowly", and that she would have been unable to cry for help.

=== Character testimony ===
On 3 October, Elizabeth Tanner, housekeeper of the common lodging-house where Stride lived at the time of her murder, testified that Stride, whom she knew as "Long Liz", had lodged at 32 Flower and Dean Street "on and off, for the last six years". Prior to 26 September, she "had been away from my [lodging] house about three months". Tanner described Stride as "very quiet" and sober. She said that, although Stride had Swedish heritage, she had "[spoken] English as well as an English woman". Stride had told her that her husband and children had drowned in the 1878 Princess Alice sinking.

Charwoman Catherine Lane testified that she knew Stride as a Swede named Long Liz, whom she had known for about six months. Lane said Stride had told her shortly before her death that she had "had a few words" with her partner, and that this was why she was again staying at Flower and Dean Street. Stride had given Lane a large piece of green velvet as she left the lodging-house, asking her to "mind" the garment until she returned.

On 3 October, Michael Kidney formally identified Stride's body, stating the two had been in a relationship for "nearly three years". He added that they had occasionally separated because of Stride's heavy drinking, although she inevitably returned to him. (Note: Other witnesses who identified Stride during the inquest were Stride's nephew-by-marriage, PC Walter Stride, and the clerk of the Swedish Church in Prince's Square, Sven Ollsen, who said he had known Stride for about 17 years.)

=== Medical testimony ===
Dr Phillips testified that the cause of death had been "undoubtedly the loss of blood from the left carotid artery and the division of the windpipe." He believed Stride had been "seized by the shoulders and placed on the ground, and that [her] murderer was [kneeling to] her right side" when he inflicted the wound to her throat.

== Conclusion ==
The inquest into Stride's murder lasted five days, with the final day of hearings being adjourned until 23 October. This final day saw three witnesses testify, all of whom confirmed the identity of the deceased.

At the conclusion of the hearings, coroner Baxter stated his belief that Stride had been attacked in a swift, sudden manner, that her death was undoubtedly a homicide, and that no known circumstances could reduce the crime to manslaughter. The murderer could have taken advantage of the checked scarf Stride was wearing to seize her from behind before cutting her throat, as Phillips had earlier suggested. Baxter, however, thought the absence of a shout for assistance and the lack of obvious marks of a struggle indicated that Stride had willingly lain down before the wound was inflicted. She was still clenching a packet of cachous in her left hand when discovered, indicating she had not had time to defend herself and that the attack had been sudden.

Regarding the crime scene, Baxter noted that Stride had been attacked in the passageway leading into a courtyard in which several families lived in cottages only yards from where her body was found. Although the location afforded darkness, he considered it unlikely the murderer had selected it because Dutfield's Yard was unfrequented. Baxter further noted that the windows of the International Working Men's Educational Club had been open, and that both Stride and her assailant would have heard the patrons' singing and dancing.

With regard to the witness testimony concerning the man or men seen in Stride's company in the two hours before her body was discovered, Baxter stated that many points of similarity had been given in the physical descriptions, but also some of dissimilarity. He said these discrepancies did not conclusively prove there had been more than one man in her company between 11:00 pm and 12:45 am, but that the eyewitness accounts suggested either that she had been with at least two men in her final hours, or that one or more eyewitness was mistaken in details of the description.

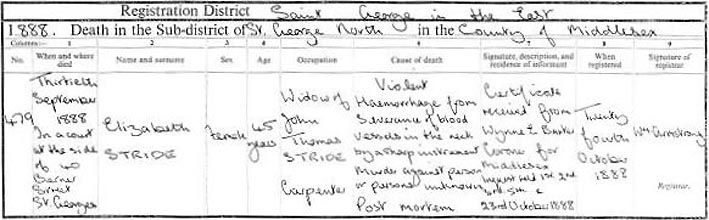
Death certificate of Elizabeth Stride, 24 October 1888

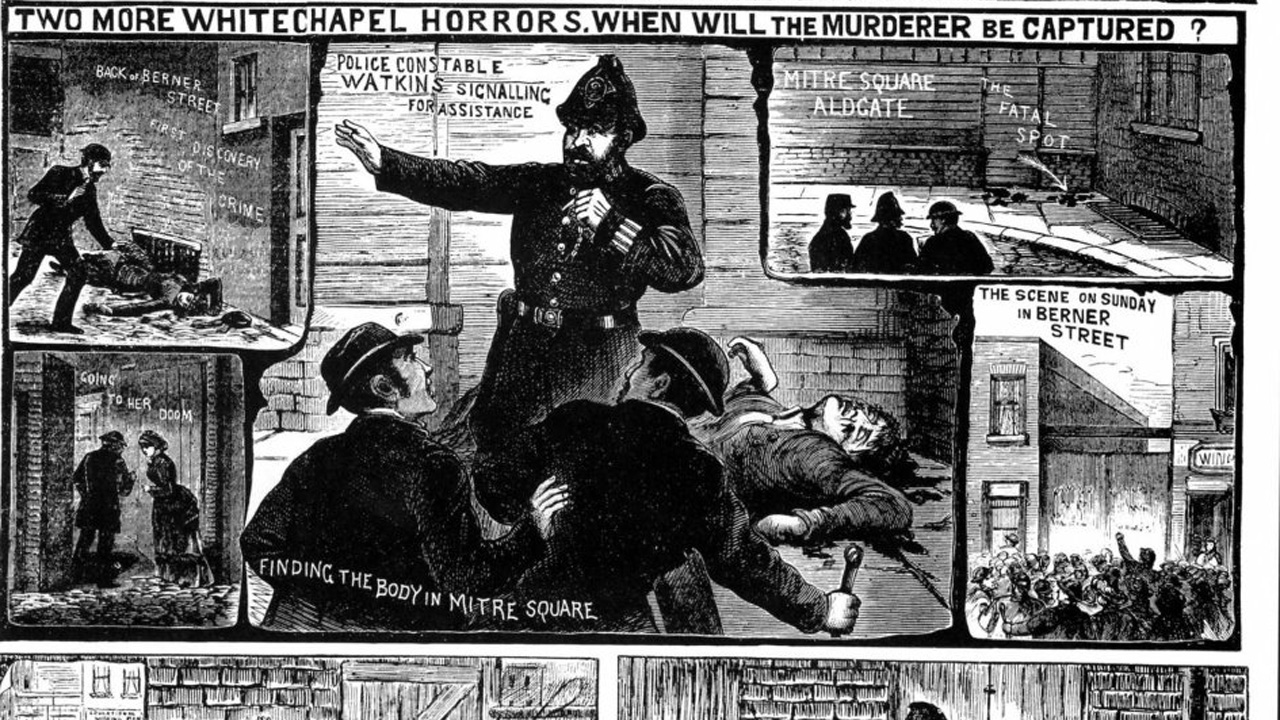
Section of the 6 October 1888 edition of The Illustrated Police News depicting the discoveries of the bodies of Elizabeth Stride and Catherine Eddowes

Following a short deliberation, the jury, having been instructed to determine precisely how, when, and by what means Stride came about her death, returned a unanimous verdict: "Wilful murder against some person or persons unknown."

== Connection to Jack the Ripper ==
Stride's murder occurred in the midst of the spree of murders attributed to a serial offender known prior to her death as both the Whitechapel Murderer and Leather Apron, and, due to a letter forwarded to Scotland Yard the day immediately prior to her death, as Jack the Ripper. Unlike at least three other victims whose deaths were attributed to this perpetrator, each of whom had received extensive abdominal injuries in addition to one or more slash wounds across the neck, Stride had received no mutilation injuries. Her sole injury was a deep cut measuring two and a half inches beneath her jaw, which had severed her left carotid artery and trachea and terminated beneath her right jaw.

As two other murders, those of Mary Ann Nichols and Annie Chapman, had occurred in Whitechapel and Spitalfields – each initially caused by knife wounds to the throat – within the previous month, Stride's murder was added to the Whitechapel murders investigation and was widely believed to have been perpetrated by the same killer. However, some commentators conclude that Stride's murder was unconnected to the other canonical murders, on the basis that her body had not been subjected to mutilation and that this was the only murder ascribed to Jack the Ripper to occur south of Whitechapel Road. It is also believed that the blade used to inflict the wound to Stride's neck may have been shorter and of a different design from that used to murder and mutilate the other four canonical victims. Most experts, however, consider the similarities distinctive enough to connect Stride's murder with the two earlier Ripper murders, in addition to the murder of Catherine Eddowes later that same night.

Stride's murder is regarded as one of the canonical Ripper killings due to numerous factors, including the general physical and lifestyle characteristics of the victim, the day of the week she was murdered, the time of death, the location, and the method of her murder. It is suspected that when Stride's murderer heard Diemschutz's horse and two-wheeled cart approaching or entering Dutfield's Yard, he ceased his attack. The killer may have still been inside Dutfield's Yard upon Diemschutz's approach, as the gate on Berner Street was the only point of entry. He may have escaped when Diemschutz entered the International Working Men's Educational Club. Less than one hour later, Eddowes was murdered in Mitre Square, and both she and Stride had lived in Flower and Dean Street.

The deaths of Eddowes and Stride sent London into a renewed state of general panic, as this was the first occasion on which two murders ascribed to the Ripper had occurred in one night.

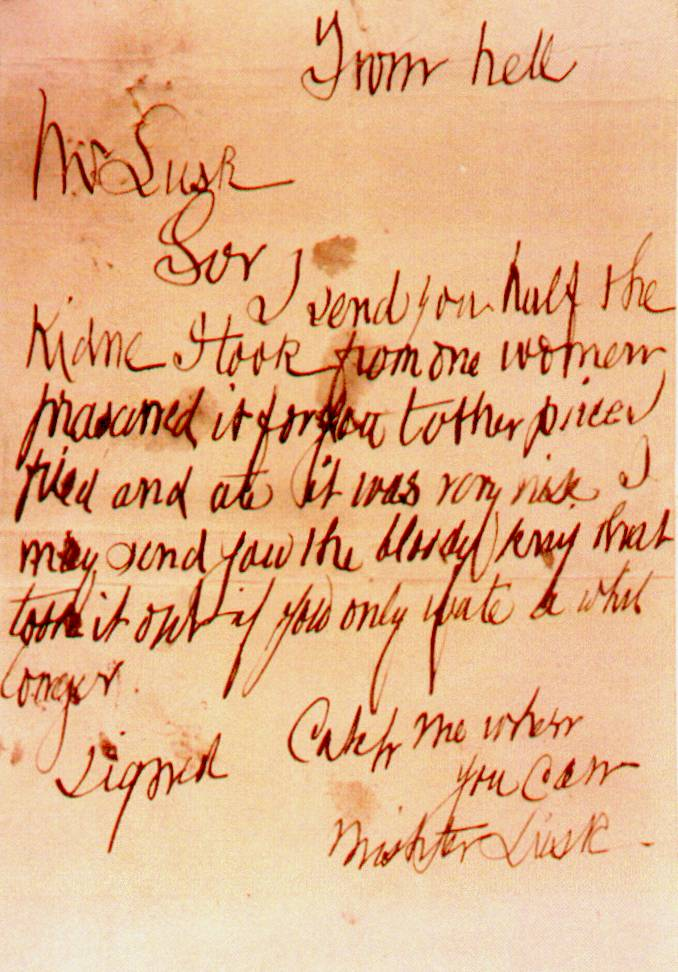
The "From Hell" letter, received by George Lusk of the Whitechapel Vigilance Committee on 16 October 1888

=== Correspondence ===
On 1 October, a postcard dubbed the "Saucy Jacky" postcard, also signed "Jack the Ripper", was received by the Central News Agency. This letter claimed responsibility for the murders of both Stride and Eddowes and described the killing of the two women as a "double event", a designation which has endured. It has been argued that the postcard was mailed before the murders were publicised, making it unlikely that a crank would hold such detailed knowledge of the crime. However, the letter was postmarked more than 24 hours after the killings, long after details were known by journalists and residents of the area. Police officials later claimed to have identified a journalist as the author, leading the postcard to be dismissed as a hoax, an assessment shared by most Ripper historians.

Two weeks later, on 16 October, a parcel containing half a preserved human kidney, accompanied by a note, was received George Lusk, Chairman of the Whitechapel Vigilance Committee. This note has become known as both the "Lusk letter" and the "From hell" letter, because of the return address used by the writer: "From hell". The author claimed to have "fried and ate" the missing half of the kidney. The handwriting and general style of this letter differ significantly from that of the "Saucy Jacky" postcard.

The section of kidney was taken to Dr Thomas Horrocks Openshaw at the nearby Royal London Hospital. He believed the kidney was human and originated from the left side of the individual from whom it had been taken. Openshaw also stated the organ had been preserved in spirits prior to postage.

Acting Commissioner of the City Police, Major Henry Smith, claimed in his memoirs that this kidney matched the one missing from the body of Eddowes, because the length of renal artery attached to the kidney matched the missing length from Eddowes's body, and that the forensic examination conducted upon Eddowes's body and the section of kidney revealed signs of Bright's disease. Smith's story is considered by some historians to be a dramatic recollection on his part.

== Other theories ==
In his book Jack the Ripper: The Final Solution, author Stephen Knight linked the physician Sir William Gull to Stride on the basis that both were reported to carry grapes, a theory dismissed by Martin Fido as a "wild allegation".

A grocer named Matthew Packer implied to two private detectives employed by the Whitechapel Vigilance Committee named Le Grand and Batchelor, that he had sold grapes to Stride and her murderer shortly before her death. When interviewed by police, Packer described the man he had seen as aged between 25 and 30, slightly taller than Stride, and wearing a soft felt hat. (Note: Packer is also known to have informed other investigators this individual had been both middle-aged and heavy set.) Neither of Packer's descriptions matched witness statements provided by others who may also have seen Stride with potential clients shortly before her murder. Overall, witness descriptions given to police of individuals seen either in Stride's company or in the vicinity of her murder differed significantly. Packer also informed a police sergeant, Stephen White, that he had closed his shop on the date of the murder without seeing any suspicious characters or activity.

At the inquest, pathologists stated emphatically that Stride had not held, swallowed, or consumed grapes in the hours before her death. Both Blackwell and Phillips described the contents of her stomach as "cheese, potatoes and farinaceous powder".

Despite Packer's contradictory statements, investigators did discover a single grape stalk in Dutfield's Yard, and his story was reported in the London Evening News on 3 October. Nonetheless, Chief Inspector Donald Swanson stated that "any statement [made by grocer Matthew Packer] would be rendered almost valueless as evidence" and had likely been fabricated so Packer could sell his story to the press.

Further doubt is cast on Packer's accounts by the general character of Le Grand (also known as Charles Grand, Charles Grandy, Charles Grant, Christian Neilson, and Christian Nelson). He had an extensive criminal record, including assault on a prostitute and conviction for theft. He was convicted of conspiracy to defraud in 1889 and served two years' imprisonment. After his release, he was arrested while in possession of a revolver and charged with demanding money with menace, a crime for which he was sentenced to twenty years' imprisonment.

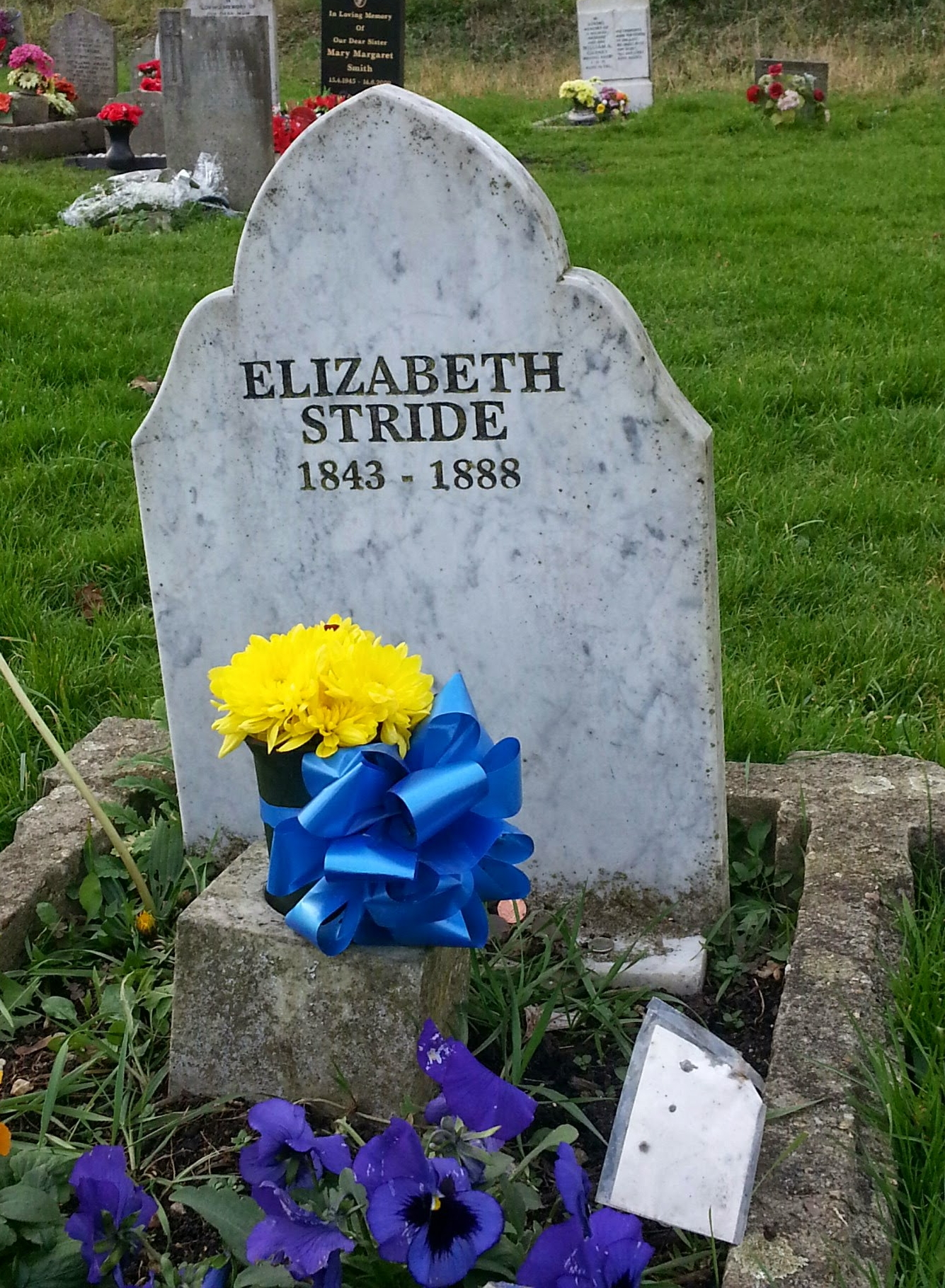
Stride's grave in East London Cemetery

== Funeral ==
Stride was buried on Saturday 6 October 1888 in the East London Cemetery, located in the east London district of Plaistow. Her funeral was attended by a small number of mourners, and the costs were provided at the expense of the parish by the undertaker, Mr Hawkes.

Stride's headstone is inscribed with her name and the years of her birth and death.

== Media ==
=== Film ===
- A Study in Terror (1965). Norma Foster is cast as Stride.
- Love Lies Bleeding (1999). A drama film directed by William Tannen. Stride is portrayed by Alice Bendová in this film.
- From Hell. (2001). Directed by the Hughes Brothers. Susan Lynch is cast as Stride.

=== Television ===
- Jack the Ripper (1988). A Thames Television film drama series starring Michael Caine. Stride is played by Angela Crow.
- The Real Jack the Ripper (2010). Directed by David Mortin. Tina Sterling is cast as Stride. First broadcast on 31 August 2010.
- Jack the Ripper: The Definitive Story (2011). A two-hour documentary referencing original police reports and eyewitness accounts. Stride is portrayed by Elizabeth Elstub.

=== Drama ===
- Jack, the Last Victim (2005). A musical casting Sallie Lloyd as Stride.

== See also ==
- Cold case
- List of serial killers before 1900
- Unsolved murders in the United Kingdom
