= Catherine Eddowes =

Whitechapel murder victim (1842–1888)

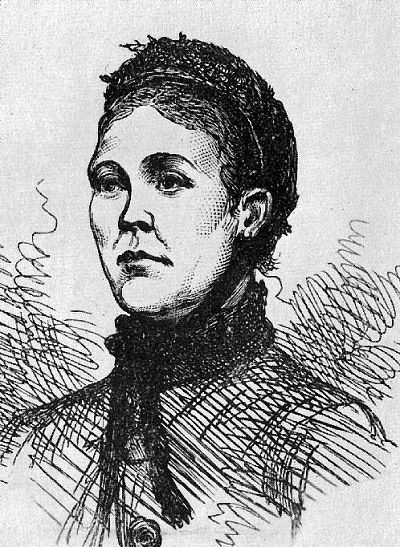
- 13 October Penny Illustrated Paper portrait of Catherine Eddowes
- Born: 14 April 1842; Wolverhampton, Staffordshire, England
- Died: 30 September 1888 (aged 46); City of London, England
- Cause of death: Haemorrhage due to severance of the left common carotid artery
- Body discovered: South corner of Mitre Square in Whitechapel; 51.5138°N 0.078°W
- Resting place: City of London Cemetery, Newham, London, England; 51.557487°N 0.053920°E (approximate)
- Occupations: Casual prostitute, hawker
- Known for: Victim of serial murder
- Partner(s): Thomas Conway (c. 1862–1881); John Kelly (1881–1888)
- Children: 3
- Parent(s): George Eddowes; Catherine (née Evans)

Catherine Eddowes (14 April 1842 – 30 September 1888) was the fourth of the canonical five victims of the unidentified serial killer known as Jack the Ripper, who is believed to have killed and mutilated at least five women in the Whitechapel and Spitalfields districts of London from late August to early November 1888.

Eddowes was murdered in the early hours of Sunday 30 September within the City of London. She was the second woman killed within an hour, the night having already seen the murder of Elizabeth Stride within the jurisdiction of the Metropolitan Police. These two murders are commonly referred to as the "double event", a term originating from the content of the "Saucy Jacky" postcard received at the Central News Agency on 1 October.

A part of a left human kidney, accompanied by a letter addressed From Hell and postmarked 15 October, was later sent to the chairman of the Whitechapel Vigilance Committee, George Lusk. The author of this letter claimed the section of kidney was from Eddowes, whose left kidney had been removed, and that he had fried and eaten the other half. Most experts, however, do not believe this kidney originated from Eddowes's body.

== Early life ==
Catherine Eddowes was born on 14 April 1842 in Graiseley Green, Wolverhampton, the sixth of twelve children of tinplate worker George Eddowes and his wife, Catherine (née Evans), who worked as a cook at the Peacock Hotel.

The family moved to London a year after her birth, where her father obtained employment with Perkins and Sharpus in Bell Court in the City of London. They first lived at 4 Baden Place, Bermondsey, before relocating to 35 West Street. Eddowes was educated at St. John's Charity School in Potter's Field. By 1851, the family was living at 35 West Street. Her mother bore eleven other children, although only ten of the twelve survived. She died of tuberculosis on 17 November 1855 at the age of 42.

By 1857, both of Eddowes's parents had died, leaving Eddowes, then aged 15, and three siblings to be admitted as orphans to a workhouse. All four attended a local industrial school intended to teach them a trade. Through this scheme, one of her older sisters, Emma, and an aunt secured employment for her as a tinplate stamper at the Old Hall Works in Wolverhampton. She moved to Wolverhampton, lived with her aunt in Bilston Street, worked at the Old Hall Works, and continued her education at Dowgate Charity School.

Within months, Eddowes was dismissed from her job, possibly after being caught stealing. The loss of employment is believed to have caused tensions with her aunt. She soon left Wolverhampton for Birmingham, where she briefly lived with an uncle, Thomas Eddowes, a shoemaker. She found work as a tray polisher at a firm in Legge Street, although after about four months she returned to Wolverhampton to live with her grandfather, who found her work as a tinplate stamper. Nine months later, she again moved to Birmingham.

Eddowes was 5 ft 0 in (1.52 m) tall, slim, with dark, wavy auburn hair and hazel eyes. Friends later described her as "a very jolly woman, always singing" and an "intelligent and scholarly [individual], but possessed of a fierce temper."

== Relationships ==
=== Thomas Conway ===
While residing in Birmingham, Eddowes began a relationship with former soldier Thomas Conway, who had served in the 18th Royal Irish Regiment and received a small regimental pension. (Note: Conway was born in County Mayo, Ireland in 1837. He had been discharged from the 18th Royal Irish Regiment in October 1861 due to illness.) The couple had two children: Catherine Ann (b. 1863) and Thomas Lawrence (b. 1867), and initially supported themselves by occasional labouring work when his health permitted. No evidence exists to support the two having married following their initial acquaintance in 1861 or 1862, although shortly after they began a relationship, Eddowes referred to herself as "Kate Conway". She later had Conway's initials ("TC") crudely tattooed in blue ink on her left forearm.

==== Relocation to London ====
In 1868, Eddowes and Conway moved to London, taking lodgings in Westminster. Their third child and second son was born in 1873. While living in London, Eddowes took to drinking, which caused rifts within her immediate family. According to later inquest testimony from her daughter, Catherine "Annie" Phillips, her parents began living on "bad terms" largely because of her mother's drinking, which increased throughout the 1870s and which her father – a teetotaler – found intolerable. By the late 1870s, quarrels between the two are believed to have become violent, with Eddowes occasionally being seen with black eyes and bruising about her face.

By 1880, Eddowes and Conway lived in a room at 71 Lower George Street, Chelsea, with their two youngest children (their oldest child had left the household by this date). Sometime the same year, Eddowes left Conway. (Note: To avoid contact with his former partner, Conway drew his army pension under the assumed name of Quinn, and kept their younger children's addresses secret from her.)

=== John Kelly ===
The precise reason why Eddowes chose to relocate from Chelsea to the East End of London is unknown, although by 1881 she was living with a new partner, John Kelly, a fruit salesman whom she had met when they both lodged at Cooney's common lodging-house at 55 Flower and Dean Street, Spitalfields, at the centre of London's most notorious criminal rookery. Thereafter, she became known to acquaintances as "Kate Kelly".

The deputy of this lodging-house, Frederick William Wilkinson, later stated Eddowes seldom drank to excess, although contemporary records indicate she was brought before Thames Magistrates' Court on a charge of being drunk and disorderly in September 1881. She was discharged without being fined.

Initially, while living in and around Spitalfields, Eddowes most often earned money by performing domestic work such as cleaning and sewing for the Jewish community in nearby Brick Lane, although she is believed to have also occasionally taken to casual prostitution to pay her daily rent. (Note: John Kelly would later state he had no knowledge of Eddowes ever "walking the streets" to earn money. This statement would be corroborated by the deputy of Cooney's Lodging-House, who stated Eddowes was generally within the lodging-house "for the night" by 9 or 10 p.m. and that he had never seen her intimate with anyone aside from Kelly in the years she typically resided at the lodging-house.) By the mid 1880s, she and Kelly also earned money by performing seasonal hop-picking work in Kent each summer.

When Eddowes could not afford a bed in a common lodging-house, she typically attempted to borrow money from her sisters or her daughter. She primarily attempted to borrow from her older sister, Elizabeth Fisher, who lived in Greenwich and whom she also visited socially on occasion. If unsuccessful in her efforts to borrow money from relatives, she is believed to have slept rough in the front room of 26 Dorset Street, known locally as "the shed".

== September 1888 ==
In September 1888, Eddowes and Kelly followed their annual practice of taking casual work hop-picking in the village of Hunton, Kent. En route to Hunton, Eddowes purchased a jacket from a pawnshop and Kelly a pair of boots from a shop in Maidstone. While partaking in this work, the two became acquainted with a woman named Emily Birrell and her common-law husband; the four slept in the same barn.

At harvest's end, Eddowes and Kelly returned to London on foot with Birrell and her partner, although they parted company midway as Birrell and her partner intended to travel to Cheltenham rather than London. Before parting, Birrell handed Eddowes a pawn ticket for a flannel shirt, saying: "I have got a pawn ticket for a flannel shirt. I wish you'd take it since you're going [to London]. It is only for 9d, and it may fit your old man." Eddowes placed the ticket inside a small mustard tin she carried.

The two reached London on 27 September, spending the night in the casual ward at Shoe Lane in the City of London. They slept in separate lodging-houses the following evening: Kelly at 52 Flower and Dean Street; Eddowes at the Mile End Casual Ward. Upon her arrival at the casual ward, the superintendent asked Eddowes, who had frequently slept at the premises, where she had recently been. She replied she had been hop‑picking and added she intended to claim the reward offered for the arrest of the Whitechapel murderer, saying, "I think I know him."

By the following day, the two had spent almost all their earnings. At 8 am on 29 September, Eddowes and Kelly met at Cooney's common lodging-house on Flower and Dean Street, where they ate breakfast before purchasing some tea and sugar. They agreed to split their last sixpence between them; he took fourpence to pay for a bed in the lodging-house, and she took twopence, enough for her to stay another night at Mile End Casual Ward.

=== 29 September ===
In the early afternoon of 29 September, Eddowes informed Kelly she intended to travel to Bermondsey to attempt to borrow money from her daughter, who by 1888 had been married to a gun-maker in Southwark for three years. The two parted company in Houndsditch at about 2 pm, with Eddowes stating she expected to return by 4 p.m. With money from pawning his boots, a barefoot Kelly took a bed at the lodging-house just after 8 pm, and according to the deputy keeper, he remained there all night.

At 8:30 pm on Saturday, 29 September, PC Louis Frederick Robinson observed a small group of people gathered outside 29 Aldgate High Street. Approaching the crowd, he saw Eddowes lying drunk on the pavement. Robinson assisted her to her feet and leaned her against the shutters of the house, although she quickly slumped back to the pavement. Summoning the assistance of PC George Simmons, the two took her into custody at Bishopsgate Police Station to be detained until she was sober enough to leave. Upon arrival, Eddowes gave her name as "Nothing", and within twenty minutes she had fallen asleep in a cell.

Shortly after 12:30 am on 30 September, Eddowes asked PC George Hutt when she could be released. Hutt replied: "When you are capable of taking care of yourself." Thirty minutes later, at 1:00 am, Eddowes was deemed sober enough to be released, stating to Hutt as he escorted her to the entrance of Bishopsgate Police Station, "All right. Good night, old cock."

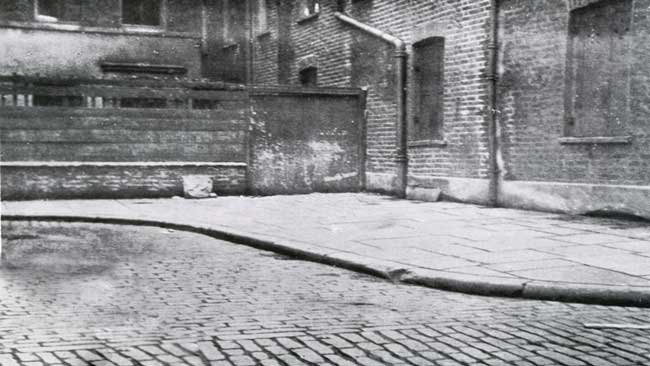
Mitre Square. The body of Catherine Eddowes was discovered close to the fence seen at the centre of this image on 30 September 1888

Before her release, Eddowes gave her name and address to Hutt as "Mary Ann Kelly of 6 Fashion Street".

=== 30 September ===
Upon leaving the station, instead of turning right to take the shortest route to her Flower and Dean Street lodging-house, Eddowes turned left in the general direction of Aldgate. She was last seen alive in a narrow walkway named Church Passage at 1:35 am by three witnesses: Joseph Lawende, Joseph Hyam Levy, and Harry Harris, who had just left the Imperial Club in Duke's Place on Duke Street.

Lawende later testified that Eddowes – wearing a black bonnet and jacket – was standing talking with a man of medium build with a fair moustache at the entrance to Church Passage, which led south-west from Duke Street into Mitre Square. She was facing the man, with one hand on his chest, although not in a manner to suggest she was resisting him. Only Lawende could furnish a clear description of the man, whom he described as about 30, approximately 5 feet 7 inches (1.70 metres) in height, and wearing a loose-fitting "pepper and salt colour loose jacket", a grey peaked cloth cap, and a "reddish" neckerchief. To Lawende, the man conveyed the overall appearance of a sailor. Lawende walked past the two and did not look back. (Note: The Chief Inspector of the Metropolitan Police, Donald Swanson, would intimate in his report into Eddowes's murder that Lawende's identification of the woman he had seen at the entrance to Church Passage as Eddowes was doubtful. Swanson wrote that Lawende had said that some clothing of the deceased's that he was shown resembled that of the woman he saw—"which was black ... that was the extent of his identity [sic]".)

== Murder ==
At 1:44 am, Eddowes's mutilated and disembowelled body was found lying on her back, with her head resting on a coal hole and turned towards her left shoulder, in the south-west corner of Mitre Square by the square's beat policeman, PC Edward Watkins, approximately fourteen minutes after he had previously passed through the square at 1:30 am. (Note: Watkins later testified at the inquest into Eddowes's murder that her body had been "cut up like a pig in the market", adding he instantly "knew the Whitechapel murderer had been our way.") Upon discovering the body, Watkins called for assistance from the night watchman at the Kearley and Tonge warehouse bordering Mitre Square, ex-policeman George James Morris. Morris had been sweeping the landings inside the warehouse, with the door to the square open, when Watkins knocked on the door and exclaimed: "For God's sake, mate, come to my assistance!" After viewing the body, Morris informed Watkins he had noted nothing unusual that evening.

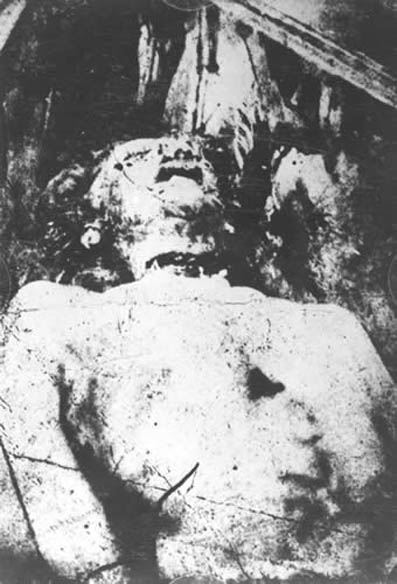
Eddowes's body, photographed prior to her post-mortem at the Golden Lane mortuary

Another watchman based at 5 Mitre Square, George Clapp, and an off-duty policeman who lived at 3 Mitre Square, Richard Pearse, later reported also having seen and heard nothing untoward. Another policeman whose beat required him to walk close to Mitre Square, PC James Harvey, had also walked down Church Passage from Duke Street shortly after Watkins had first passed through the square at 1:30 am, although his beat took him back down Church Passage and onto Duke Street without entering the square. Harvey had also seen nothing out of the ordinary. He was one of the first policemen to arrive at the crime scene in response to Morris's police whistle.

Another policeman to arrive in response to Morris's whistle, PC Holland, immediately summoned local surgeon George William Sequeira to the scene. Sequeira arrived at 1:55 am. Within minutes, police surgeon Frederick Gordon Brown had also arrived at the scene.

=== Goulston Street graffito ===
At approximately 2:55 am on 30 September, a blood-stained fragment of Eddowes's apron was discovered at the bottom of a common stairway at a tenement in Goulston Street, Whitechapel, by PC Alfred Long. The section was also contaminated with faecal matter, and Long was adamant the garment had not lain in the doorway when he had previously passed the location at 2:20 am. Scrawled upon the wall above the section of apron was a crude chalk graffito – the letters measuring approximately three-quarters of an inch – commonly held to have read: "The Juwes are the men that Will not be Blamed for nothing".

The message appeared to imply that a Jew or Jews in general were responsible for the series of murders, although it is unclear whether the graffito was written by the murderer upon dropping the section of apron or was merely present at the location. (Note: Goulston Street is located close to Petticoat Lane Market. In the 1880s, many Jewish vendors sold wares to the local Gentile populace six days a week at this street market.) Antisemitic graffiti was commonplace in and around Whitechapel. Although the City of London Police believed the graffito should be photographed, fearing potential antisemitic riots should members of the public view the writing at daybreak, the Metropolitan Police Commissioner, Charles Warren, ordered the graffito washed from the wall at approximately 5 am. Nonetheless, the words – including all grammatical errors – were copied before they were washed off the wall.

== Post-mortem ==
The subsequent post-mortem records of Frederick Gordon Brown – who arrived at the crime scene shortly after 2:00 am – state:

The body was on its back, the head turned to left shoulder. The arms by the side of the body as if they had fallen there. Both palms upwards, the fingers slightly bent. A thimble was lying off the finger on the right side. The clothes drawn up above the abdomen. The thighs were naked. Left leg extended in a line with the body. The abdomen was exposed. Right leg bent at the thigh and knee.
The bonnet was at the back of the head – great disfigurement of the face. The throat cut. Across below the throat was a neckerchief. ... The intestines were drawn out to a large extent and placed over the right shoulder – they were smeared over with some feculent matter. A piece of about two feet was quite detached from the body and placed between the body and the left arm, apparently by design. The lobe and auricle of the right ear were cut obliquely through. There was a quantity of clotted blood on the pavement on the left side of the neck round the shoulder and upper part of the arm, and fluid blood-coloured serum which had flowed under the neck to the right shoulder, the pavement sloping in that direction.
Body was quite warm. No death stiffening had taken place. She must have been dead most likely within the half hour. We looked for superficial bruises and saw none. No blood on the skin of the abdomen or secretion of any kind on the thighs. No spurting of blood on the bricks or pavement around. No marks of blood below the middle of the body. Several buttons were found in the clotted blood after the body was removed. There was no blood on the front of the clothes. There were no traces of recent connection.

Brown conducted the post-mortem upon Eddowes's body that afternoon, noting:

After washing the left hand carefully, a bruise the size of a sixpence, recent and red, was discovered on the back of the left hand between the thumb and first finger. A few small bruises on right shin of older date. The hands and arms were bronzed. No bruises on the scalp, the back of the body, or the elbows. The face was very much mutilated. There was a cut about a quarter of an inch through the lower left eyelid, dividing the structures completely through. The upper eyelid on that side, there was a scratch through the skin on the left upper eyelid, near to the angle of the nose. The right eyelid was cut through to about half an inch. There was a deep cut over the bridge of the nose, extending from the left border of the nasal bone down near the angle of the jaw on the right side of the cheek. This cut went into the bone and divided all the structures of the cheek except the mucous membrane of the mouth. The tip of the nose was quite detached by an oblique cut from the bottom of the nasal bone to where the wings of the nose join on to the face. A cut from this divided the upper lip and extended through the substance of the gum over the right upper lateral incisor tooth. ... There was on each side of cheek a cut which peeled up the skin, forming a triangular flap about an inch and a half. On the left cheek there were two abrasions of the epithelium under the left ear. ... The cause of death was haemorrhage from the left common carotid artery. The death was immediate and the mutilations were inflicted after death ... There would not be much blood on the murderer. The cut was made by someone on the right side of the body, kneeling below the middle of the body. ... The peritoneal lining was cut through on the left side and the left kidney carefully taken out and removed. ... I believe the perpetrator of the act must have had considerable knowledge of the position of the organs in the abdominal cavity and the way of removing them. The parts removed would be of no use for any professional purpose. It required a great deal of knowledge to have removed the kidney and to know where it was placed. Such a knowledge might be possessed by one in the habit of cutting up animals. I think the perpetrator of this act had sufficient time ... It would take at least five minutes. ... I believe it was the act of one person.

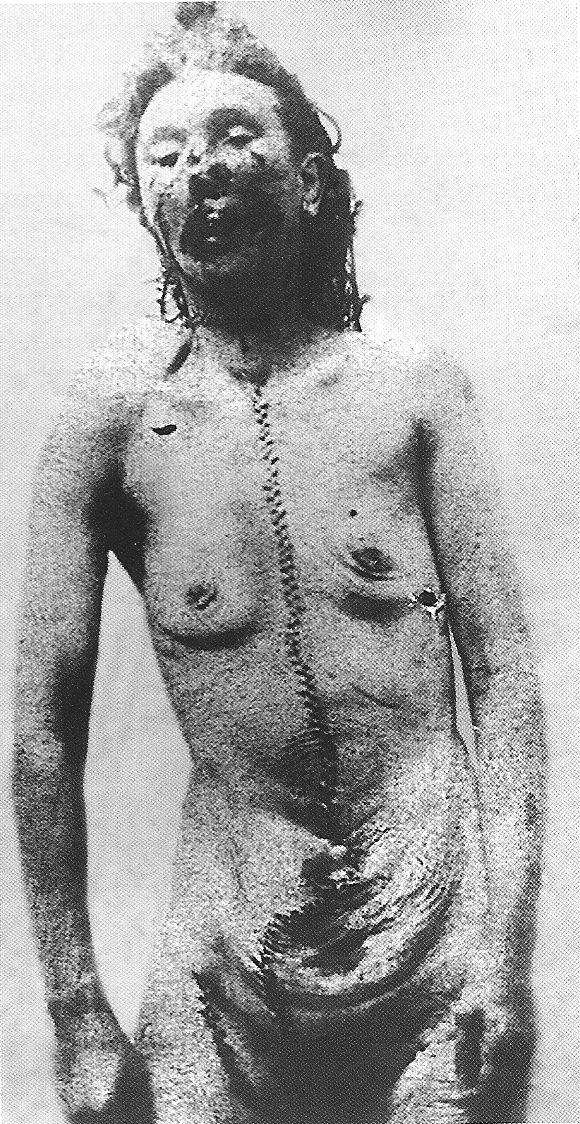
Mortuary photograph of Eddowes after her post-mortem

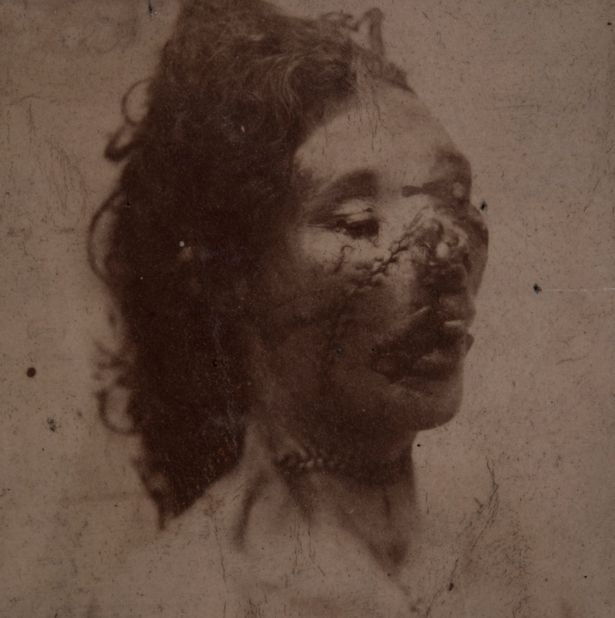
Mortuary photograph of Eddowes's face and neck

=== Disputed anatomical knowledge ===
Although George Bagster Phillips – who had been invited to attend Eddowes's autopsy – agreed with Brown that the degree of anatomical knowledge shown by the individual who performed the mutilations and eviscerations "gave no evidence of anatomical knowledge in the sense that it evidenced the hand of a qualified surgeon", he concurred that the perpetrator may have held the degree of knowledge expected of a butcher or slaughterman. However, police physician Thomas Bond disagreed with Brown's assessment of the perpetrator's anatomical skill. Bond's report to police stated: "In each case the mutilation was inflicted by a person who had no scientific nor anatomical knowledge. In my opinion he does not even possess the technical knowledge of a butcher or horse slaughterer or any person accustomed to cut up dead animals."

George Sequeira, the first doctor at the crime scene, and City medical officer William Sedgwick Saunders, who was also present at the autopsy, also opined that the killer lacked anatomical skill and did not seek particular organs.

== Inquest ==
The official inquest into Eddowes's death was opened in the inquest hall adjacent to the City of London Mortuary on the afternoon of 4 October. The inquest was presided over by the coroner for the City of London, Samuel F. Langham.

The first day of the inquest heard testimony from seven witnesses, including one of Eddowes's sisters, Eliza Gold, who testified she had positively identified the decedent as her sister and that she had last seen Eddowes "three or four weeks" prior to the inquest, when Eddowes had made a point of visiting her when she had been ill.

=== Character testimony ===
John Kelly also testified on the first day of the inquest. He positively identified the decedent as "Catherine Conway", adding he had lived with her for seven years and had last seen her alive at "about two o'clock" on 29 September. Kelly testified that Eddowes typically earned her living by hawking goods, that she never lived "by immoral purposes", and that she seldom drank.

Also to testify on the first day of the inquest was the deputy of Cooney's common lodging-house, Frederick Wilkinson, who stated he had known Eddowes for approximately seven years and that she lived "on good terms" with Kelly. Wilkinson confirmed Eddowes typically returned to the lodging-house in the early evening. His testimony was followed by that of the policeman who found Eddowes's body, Edward Watkins, who testified his beat typically took "twelve to fourteen minutes" to complete, and that when he had passed through Mitre Square at 1:30 am nothing had been amiss. Watkins then described his actions upon discovering the body fifteen minutes later and stated he was adamant nothing could have escaped his attention in the square.

Frederick Foster, an architect who had produced a plan of Mitre Square following Eddowes's murder, then testified that an individual could walk from Berner Street (site of the murder of Elizabeth Stride) to Mitre Street in twelve minutes. (Note: The Royal London Hospital preserves some of the contemporary crime scene drawings and plans of Mitre Square created by Frederick Foster; these were first brought to public attention in 1966 by Francis Camps, the Professor of Forensic Medicine at the University of London. Based on his analysis of the surviving documents, Camps concluded the cuts inflicted to Eddowes's body "could not have been [inflicted] by an expert.") His testimony was followed by that of Inspector Collard of the City Police, who described responding to the crime scene, the subsequent actions of police, and his accompanying Drs Sequeira and Brown to the Golden Lane mortuary in the presence of Eddowes's body.

=== Medical testimony ===
The final witness to testify on the first day of the inquest was Brown (who also testified on the second day of the inquest). Brown stated his belief that Eddowes had died very quickly as a result of haemorrhaging to her carotid artery resulting from the cut to her throat as she lay on the ground, and that death had occurred thirty to forty minutes prior to his arrival in Mitre Square at about 2:20 am. The mutilations to Eddowes's body had all been inflicted with a knife at least six inches in length after death, with the perpetrator most likely kneeling at the right side of Eddowes's body as he inflicted them. Brown further testified the perpetrator "must have had a good deal of knowledge as to the position of the abdominal organs, and the way of removing them."

Following Brown's testimony, proceedings were adjourned until Thursday 11 October. Fifteen witnesses testified on this date, including George Sequeira, who testified to being the first medical individual to arrive at the crime scene. Sequeira corroborated Brown's earlier testimony, although he added his opinion that the perpetrator "was not possessed of any great anatomical skill". Sequeira's testimony was followed by that of a medical officer named William Saunders, who testified no trace of poison existed in Eddowes's body.

=== Further witnesses ===
Eddowes's daughter, Catherine Phillips, then testified as to the acrimonious relationship between her parents, adding she had not seen her father for over a year and her mother for two years prior to her murder. Phillips added she had purposely kept her address a secret from her mother due to her frequently "applying for money" from her.

Four police officers then testified in succession. Three testified as to finding the decedent drunk on Aldgate High Street, her being brought to Bishopsgate Police Station, and her subsequent release in the early hours of 30 September. Their testimony was followed by that of George Morris, who testified to being informed by PC Watkins of his discovery in Mitre Square, stating: "The constable said, 'For God's sake, mate, come to my assistance.' I said, 'Stop till I get my lamp. What is the matter?' 'Oh, dear,' he exclaimed, 'here is another woman cut to pieces.'" Morris emphasised he had heard nothing amiss that evening and that, had Eddowes elicited a shout or scream, he would have heard. This testimony was then corroborated by PC James Harvey, who testified that although his own beat did not take him beyond Church Passage, he had "not seen anyone nor heard a cry" until hearing Morris's police whistle.

Following the testimony of watchman George Clapp and City constable Richard Pearce (who resided at 3 Mitre Square), Joseph Lawende testified to having "observed a man and woman together at the corner of Church Passage ... leading to Mitre Square" approximately "nine or ten feet" from him. Lawende testified he had provided a description of the individual he had seen in Eddowes's company, although he doubted he would be able to recognise this individual again. Lawende's testimony was followed by Joseph Levy, who confirmed the time he, Lawende and Harris had passed the two individuals at the corner of Church Passage, although Levy stated nothing about the two aroused any suspicion within him.

PC Alfred Long then testified to finding a "portion of white apron" at the doorway to numbers 106-119 Goulston Street, and the graffito upon the wall above, which he had noted in his pocket-book. Long stated he had searched the property within minutes of this discovery, finding nothing amiss, before proceeding to the police station, leaving another constable who had arrived at the scene to "keep observation on the dwelling house, and see if any one entered or left."

The final witness to testify, Detective Constable Daniel Halse, testified as to his issuing instructions "for the neighbourhood to be searched and every man stopped and examined" upon learning of Eddowes's murder. Halse also testified that, having proceeded to Goulston Street and viewed the graffito, he had heard gossip among police officers that the word "Juwes" should be erased from the wall and the remainder of the inscription remain, stating: "The fear on the part of the Metropolitan Police [was] that the writing might cause riot was the sole reason why [the graffito] was rubbed out." Halse also testified the graffito – "written with white chalk on a black facia" – was recently inscribed.

== Conclusion ==
The inquest into Eddowes's murder lasted two days, with the final day of hearings adjourned until 11 October. Following a short deliberation, the jury, having been instructed to consider precisely how, when, and by what means Eddowes came about her death, returned a verdict of wilful murder against some person unknown. Each juror agreed to present their fees to Eddowes's daughter.

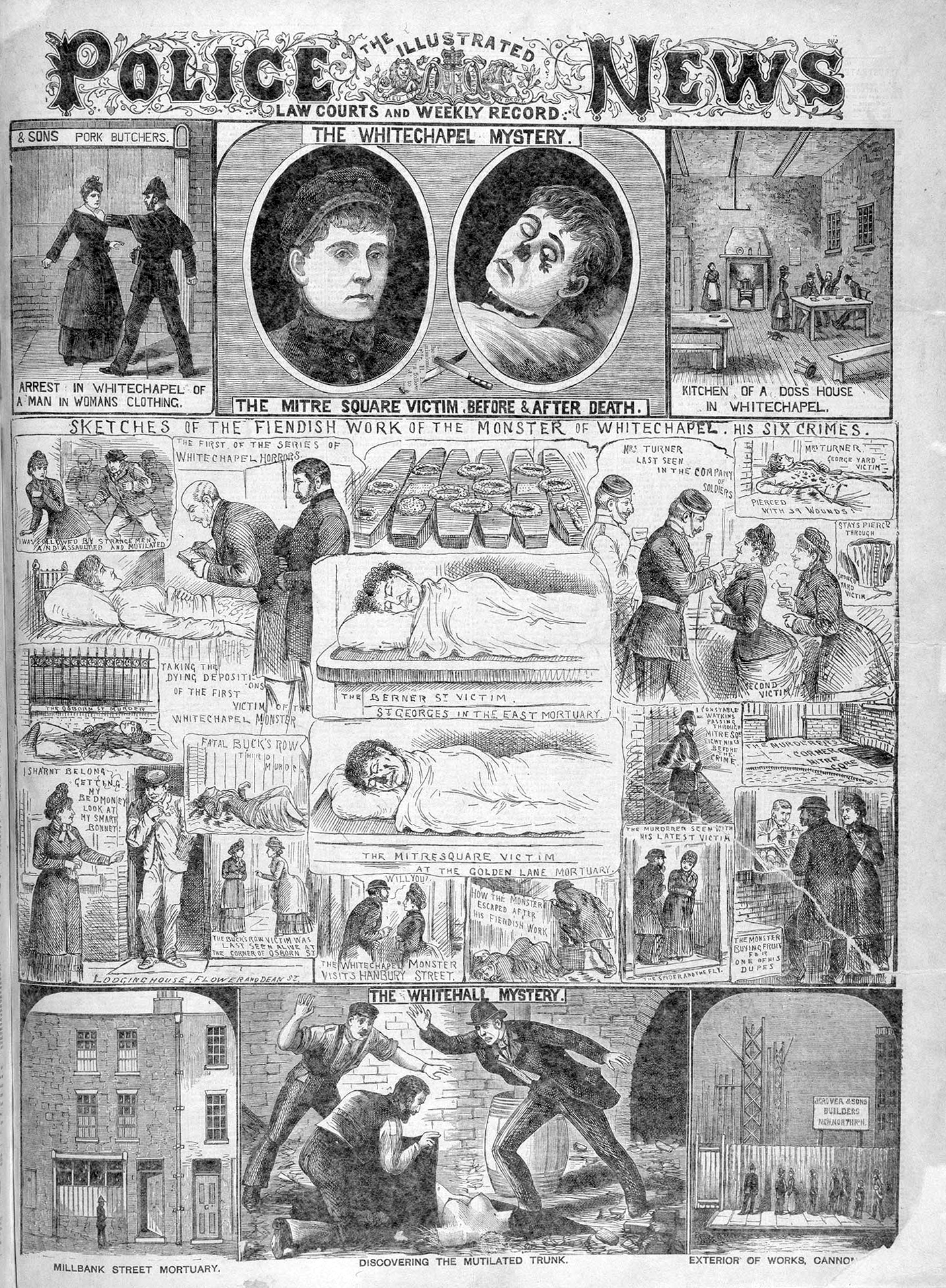
13 October 1888 edition of The Illustrated Police News depicting the discovery of Eddowes's body

== Investigation ==
Due to the location of Mitre Square, the City of London Police, under the command of Detective Inspector James McWilliam, joined the existing Metropolitan Police manhunt to identify and apprehend the perpetrator. A house-to-house search was conducted by the City Police, but nothing suspicious or of use to the enquiry was discovered.

A small mustard tin containing two pawn tickets was discovered among Eddowes's personal possessions. One ticket had been issued on 31 August to Emily Birell in relation to a flannel shirt; the other to a Church Street pawnbroker named Smith, issued on 29 September to Jane Kelly in relation to a pair of boots. Published details of these tickets led to John Kelly identifying the decedent as his common-law wife on 2 October after he read reports pertaining to the pawn tickets and the distinctive tattoo upon the victim's left forearm in the newspapers. His identification was soon confirmed by Eddowes's older sister, Eliza Gold. No money was found on her. Although the murder occurred within the City of London, it was close to the boundary of Whitechapel, where the previous Whitechapel murders had occurred. The mutilation of Eddowes's body and the abstraction of her left kidney and part of her womb bore the signature of Jack the Ripper and was very similar in nature to that of earlier victim Annie Chapman.

Mitre Square had three connecting streets: Church Passage to the north-east, Mitre Street to the south-west, and St James's Place to the north-west. As PC Harvey had seen no-one exiting from Church Passage, and PC Watkins saw no-one leaving the square from Mitre Street, the murderer must have left the square northwards through St James's Place towards Goulston Street, where he had dropped the section of Eddowes's blood-stained apron.

Goulston Street was within a quarter of an hour's walk from Mitre Square, on a direct route to Flower and Dean Street where Eddowes had lodged, indicating that her murderer likely also resided nearby and had headed in the direction of his home after the killing. The graffito found above the apron may or may not have been related to the murder, but either way it was washed away before dawn on the orders of Metropolitan Police Commissioner Sir Charles Warren, who had feared that, should members of the public see the inscription, anti-Jewish riots may ensue.

Major Henry Smith, acting Commissioner of the City Police, claimed in his memoirs to have discovered bloodied water in a public sink in a court off Dorset Street, and as the water was slowly running out of the basin, he calculated that the Ripper had been there only moments before. Ripper author Martin Fido thought it unlikely that the culprit would wait to wash his hands in a semi-public place about forty minutes after the crime, and Smith's memoirs are both unreliable and embellished for dramatic effect. There is no mention of the sink in the official police reports.

== Correspondence ==
=== "Saucy Jacky" postcard ===
On 1 October, a postcard, dubbed the "Saucy Jacky" postcard and signed "Jack the Ripper", was received by the Central News Agency. The author claimed responsibility for the murders of both Stride and Eddowes the previous day, describing the killing of the two women as the "double event", a designation which has endured. It has been argued that the postcard was mailed before the murders were publicised, making it unlikely that a crank would have such knowledge of the crime, but the correspondence was postmarked more than 24 hours after the killings – long after all details were known by journalists and residents of the area.

Police officials later claimed to have identified a London-based journalist as the author of this postcard, which they dismissed as a hoax, an assessment shared by most Ripper historians, many of whom believe that all correspondence received in the manhunt for the Ripper was fabricated by journalists and/or the public.

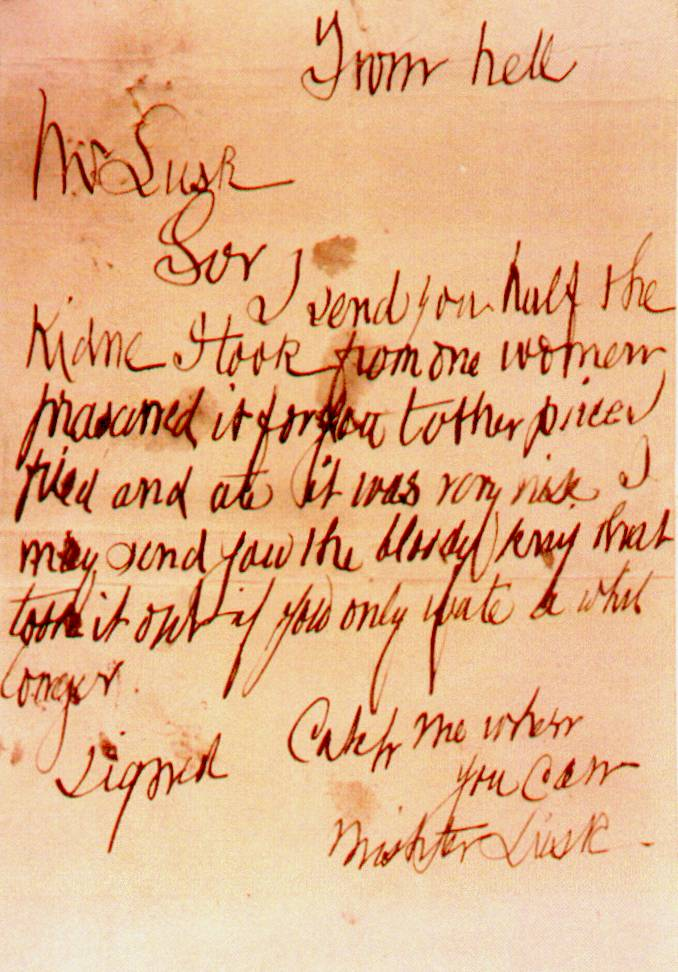
The "From Hell" letter, received by George Lusk of the Whitechapel Vigilance Committee on 16 October 1888

=== "From Hell" letter ===
On 16 October 1888, a cubical parcel measuring three-and-a-half inches and containing half a preserved human kidney was received by the Chairman of the Whitechapel Vigilance Committee, George Lusk. The parcel was accompanied by a note known as both the "Lusk letter" and the "From Hell" letter, owing to the phrase "from hell" used by the writer as the address of origin. The author claimed to have "fried and ate" the missing kidney half. The handwriting and style were unlike that of the "Saucy Jacky" postcard, and the linguistic characteristics indicated the author was either Irish, of Irish extraction, or intentionally mimicking Irish pronunciations.

==== Human kidney ====
The kidney was taken to Thomas Horrocks Openshaw at the nearby London Hospital. Openshaw believed the kidney was human, originated from the left side of the body, and had been preserved in spirits prior to being posted to Lusk on 15 October. The Daily Telegraph reported on 19 October that Openshaw had described the specimen as a recent "ginny kidney" from a 45-year-old female. However, the Star reported the same day that Openshaw strongly denied the report, saying it was impossible to detect the age or gender of the individual to whom the kidney had belonged, or how long the organ had been preserved in spirits. (Note: In an interview given to the Sunday Times, published on 21 October 1888, Frederick Gordon Brown stated the portion of kidney sent to George Lusk on 16 October had "not been [preserved] in spirits for more than a week", adding the section of kidney displayed no signs of decomposition. Brown then elaborated: "As it exhibits no trace of decomposition, when we consider the length of time that has elapsed since the commission of the murder, we come to the conclusion that the probability is slight of its being a portion of the murdered woman of Mitre Square.")

Major Henry Smith claimed in his memoirs that the kidney received by Lusk matched the one missing from Eddowes, because the length of renal artery attached to the kidney matched the missing length from the body, and both the body and kidney showed signs of Bright's disease. (Note: Eddowes had been buried one week prior to Lusk receiving the "From Hell" letter. As such, it was impossible to compare the length of renal artery attached to the kidney within the parcel to Eddowes's body to verify or discount the author's claims.) Smith's later recollection does not match the medical reports submitted by the examining pathologists or the police records. Police surgeon Brown said the kidney had been trimmed up and that the renal artery was entirely absent. Metropolitan police memos state that the kidney could have come from any body, such as those found in a hospital morgue.

Smith's account is thought by historians to be dramatic licence; the kidney itself could have been sent to Lusk as a medical student's prank. Saunders, who attended Eddowes's post-mortem, later stated to the press: "the right kidney of the woman Eddowes was perfectly normal in its structure and healthy ... my opinion is that it was a student's antic." Chief Inspector Donald Swanson, who co-ordinated the inquiry, wrote: "similar kidneys might and could be obtained from any dead person upon whom a post-mortem had been made for any cause, by students or dissecting room porter."

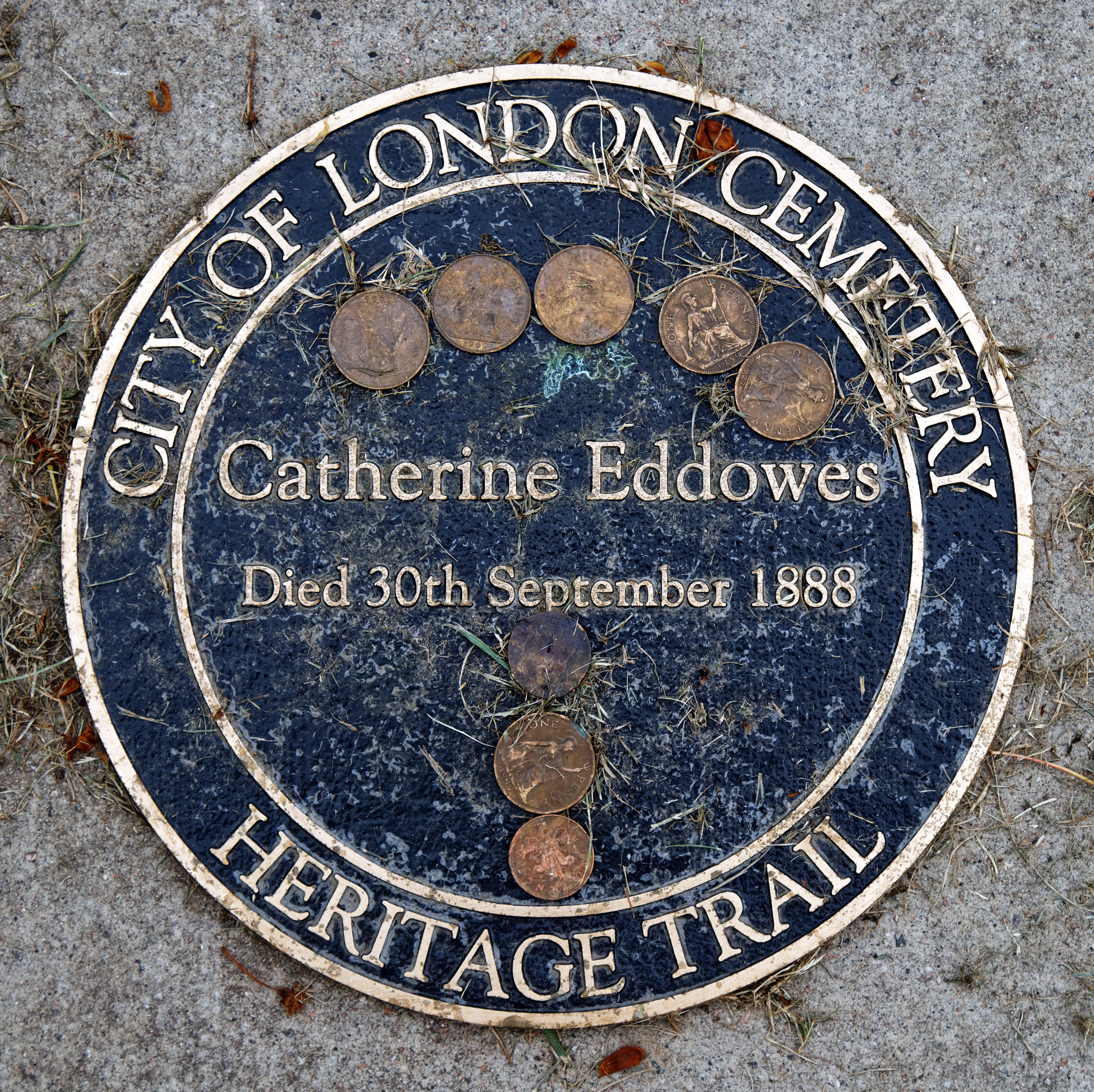
Catherine Eddowes's grave marker at the City of London Cemetery

== Funeral ==
Eddowes was buried on the afternoon of Monday, 8 October 1888. She was laid to rest in an unmarked public grave at no.49336, square 318, in the City of London Cemetery, in a service conducted by Reverend Dunscombe. Her coffin was of polished elm and bore a plate inscribed with the words "Catherine Eddowes, died Sept. 30, 1888, aged 43 years."

Numerous people lined the streets as the cortège – consisting of an open glass hearse drawn by horses – began the procession from the Golden Lane mortuary to the cemetery at precisely 1:30 pm. A mourning coach containing John Kelly, four of Eddowes's sisters, and two of her nieces followed the coffin. An estimated 500 people were present as the coffin arrived at the City of London Cemetery prior to interment.

Today, the section of the cemetery where Eddowes was interred has been re-used as part of the Memorial Gardens for cremated remains. Eddowes lies beside the Garden Way in front of Memorial Bed no.1849. In late 1996, the cemetery authorities decided to formally mark Eddowes's grave with a plaque.

== Later developments ==
In 2014, mitochondrial DNA matching that of one of Eddowes's descendants was extracted from an 8-foot section of shawl said to have come from the scene of her murder. The actual source of the stains upon the shawl used in the testing could not be definitively classified, although they are hypothesised to derive from blood spatter and, in one instance, possibly semen. The DNA on the shawl believed to originate from traces of semen matched DNA from a descendant of Ripper suspect Aaron Kosminski. This match was also based on a segment of mitochondrial DNA, although no information was given that would enable the commonness of the sequence to be estimated.

The shawl is alleged to have been retrieved by a policeman investigating the scene of Eddowes's murder and subsequently handed down successive family generations before being presented to Scotland Yard's Crime Museum in 1991. Unsure of the garment's authenticity, Scotland Yard never placed the shawl on display.

The alleged DNA match was based on one of seven small segments taken from the hypervariable regions within the DNA. The segment contained a sequence variation described as 314.1C, and claimed to be uncommon, with a frequency of only one in 290,000 worldwide. However, Professor Sir Alec Jeffreys and others pointed out this was an error in nomenclature for the common sequence variation 315.1C, which is present in more than 99% of the sequences in the EMPOP database.

The owner of the shawl, British author and amateur sleuth Russell Edwards, has since claimed these forensic results prove Kosminski was Jack the Ripper. He is quoted as saying: "Seven years after I bought the shawl, we had nailed Aaron Kosminski." However, other experts strongly disagree. Donald Rumbelow criticised Edwards' claims, noting that no shawl is listed among Eddowes's personal effects by the police, and that the policeman who allegedly retrieved the garment was based in North London in 1888, making him unlikely to have been present at any of the crime scenes.

Archaeological geneticists have also stated the forensic techniques used in reaching this conclusion are neither new nor scientifically accurate. Mitochondrial DNA expert Peter Gill has stated the shawl "is of dubious origin and has been handled by several people who could have shared that mitochondrial DNA profile." Two of Eddowes's descendants are also known to have been in the same room as the shawl for three days shortly after Edwards purchased the garment in 2007. In the words of one critic, "The shawl has been openly handled by loads of people and been touched, breathed on, spat upon. My DNA is probably on there. What's more, Kosminski is likely to have frequented prostitutes in the East End of London. ... If I examined that shawl, I'd probably find links to 150 other men from the area."

== Media ==
=== Film ===
- A Study in Terror (1965). This film casts Kay Walsh as Catherine Eddowes.
- Love Lies Bleeding (1999). A drama film directed by William Tannen. Eddowes is portrayed by Elin Spidlová.
- From Hell. (2001). Directed by the Hughes Brothers, the film casts Lesley Sharp as Catherine Eddowes.

=== Television ===
- Jack the Ripper (1973). A six-part BBC television drama series. This series casts Hilary Sesta as Catherine Eddowes.
- Jack the Ripper (1988). A Thames Television film drama series starring Michael Caine. Catherine Eddowes is played by actress Susan George.
- The Real Jack the Ripper (2010). Directed by David Mortin, this series casts Sarah Williamson as Catherine Eddowes and was first broadcast on 31 August 2010.
- Jack the Ripper: The Definitive Story (2011). A two-hour documentary which references original police reports and eyewitness accounts pertaining to the Whitechapel Murderer. Eddowes is portrayed by Caroline Waite.

=== Drama ===
- Jack, the Last Victim (2005). This musical casts Janet Wheeler as Catherine Eddowes.

== See also ==
- Cold case
- List of serial killers before 1900
- List of unsolved murders in the United Kingdom (before 1970)
