= Thomas Horrocks Openshaw =

British surgeon (1856–1929)

Thomas Horrocks Openshaw CB CMG TD FRCS
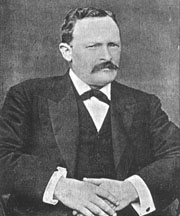
- Openshaw, c. 1902
- Born: 17 March 1856; Bury, Greater Manchester, Lancashire
- Died: 17 November 1929 (aged 73)
- Occupation: Surgeon
- Known for: Brief involvement in trying to solve Jack the Ripper murders of 1888

Thomas Horrocks Openshaw CB CMG TD FRCS (17 March 1856 – 17 November 1929) was an English Victorian and Edwardian era surgeon perhaps best known for his brief involvement in attempting to solve the notorious Jack the Ripper murders of 1888.

== Early life and medical career ==
Openshaw was born in Bury in Lancashire, England, and was educated at Bristol Grammar School. On leaving school he originally trained as an engineer, but then entered Durham University to study medicine. In 1877 he entered the London Hospital Medical College, where he was noted as a successful student and a good football player. In 1879 Openshaw won the Outpatient Dresser's Prize of £15, awarded to the best dresser of wounds in the Outpatients Department.

Having successfully completed his medical studies, Openshaw was awarded an MBBS (Durham) and, in 1883, was appointed a Member of the Royal College of Surgeons. Openshaw took the English Conjoint Diploma in 1884, and in 1886 became a Fellow of the Royal College of Surgeons. Among Openshaw's other qualifications at that time were Licentiate of the Society of Apothecaries and Master of Surgery (Durham).

Following his Fellowship, he was appointed Assistant Demonstrator of Anatomy at the London Hospital Medical College in 1886, and, after his subsequent appointment as Curator of the Pathology Museum in 1887, he extended and catalogued the Museum's collection of pathological specimens, thereby creating an important research facility for the college's medical students. Openshaw's medical career continued to develop at the London Hospital with his appointment as assistant surgeon in 1890 and surgeon in 1899. He founded the Orthopaedic Department at the London Hospital, and became a consulting surgeon in 1926.

== Jack the Ripper ==
When a kidney, purportedly from Jack the Ripper victim Catherine Eddowes, was posted to George Lusk, Chairman of the Whitechapel Vigilance Committee, together with the From Hell letter, Lusk was persuaded by his fellow Committee members to take them to Dr Frederick Wiles, who had a surgery nearby on the Mile End Road.

Wiles was out, so his assistant, F. S. Reed, examined the contents of the box and took the kidney to Openshaw at the nearby London Hospital. Openshaw believed that the kidney was from the left side of a human body.

As Openshaw was frequently mentioned in press reports at the time in connection with the kidney and From Hell letter, his name became known widely among the general public. On 29 October 1888 he received a letter through the post addressed to 'Dr Openshaw, Pathological curator, London Hospital, Whitechapel' and postmarked 'LONDON E', 'OC29 88'. The text of the letter reads as follows:

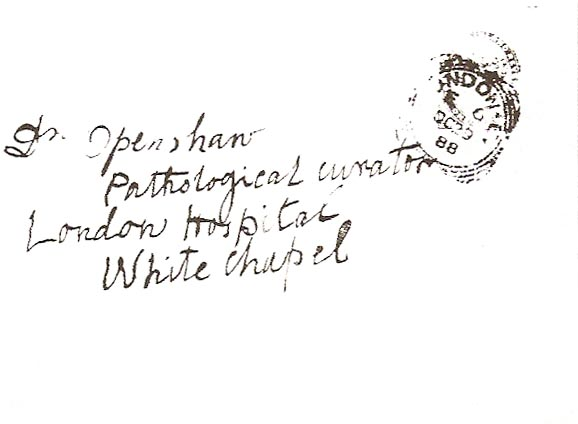
Envelope containing the "Openshaw Letter"

Old boss you was rite it was the left kidny i was goin to hoperate agin close to your ospitle just as i was going to dror mi nife along of er bloomin throte them cusses of coppers spoilt the game but i guess i wil be on the job soon and will send you another bit of innerds

Jack the Ripper

O have you seen the devle
with his mikerscope and scalpul
a-lookin at a kidney

with a slide cocked up.

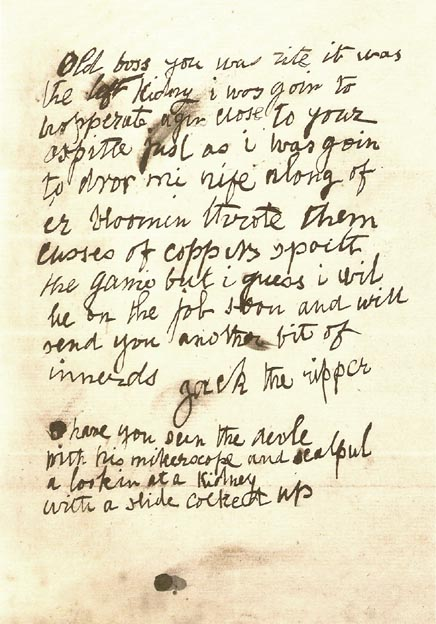
Copy of the "Openshaw Letter"

This letter has become known as the "Openshaw Letter". A copy of the letter is on display with other Ripper items in the Royal London Hospital's museum in Whitechapel.

The letter was also used by author Patricia Cornwell to try to substantiate her claim that Walter Sickert was the Ripper. She claims that the paper used for the Openshaw Letter came from the same manufacturers as paper used by Sickert. However, it was a brand of stationery that was widely available at the time. Also according to Cornwell, mitochondrial DNA extracted from the stamp on the envelope could not be ruled out as being the same as that found on other Sickert letters. Mitochondrial DNA, however, is not a definitive test of identity and the sequence found by Cornwell's team of experts could be from one of over 400,000 individuals.

== Military service ==
As a youth Openshaw became a member of the British Army's volunteer force (the then equivalent of the Territorial Army), eventually being appointed lieutenant colonel in the Lincolnshire Yeomanry. Having been appointed surgeon to the Volunteer Medical Staff Corps in 1888, when the Second Boer War broke out in South Africa in October 1899, Openshaw left his duties at the London Hospital and went there as surgeon to the Imperial Yeomanry Field Hospital. Openshaw was taken prisoner by the Boers, but was released after two weeks of confinement during an exchange of prisoners. He was subsequently appointed Principal Medical Officer at the Number Three Medical School Hospital in Pretoria. For his services during the Second Boer War Openshaw was awarded the Companion of the Most Distinguished Order of St Michael and St George (CMG) by Queen Victoria.

As Openshaw was 58 years old when the First World War broke out in 1914, he was considered too old to serve abroad in the front line. Nevertheless, he was determined to contribute to the war effort and therefore served with the rank of colonel in the Royal Army Medical Corps (Territorial Force) as a consulting surgeon based in the United Kingdom. Openshaw later received the Territorial Decoration (TD) for his services.

He was elected surgeon to the King Edward VII Hospital, and later, as an acknowledged expert in orthopaedic surgery, he was instrumental in establishing the Queen Mary Convalescent Auxiliary Hospital for the Limbless at Roehampton, where he oversaw the development of effective artificial limbs for the thousands of men who had become amputees because of injuries sustained during the war. In 1917 he was awarded the Companion of the Most Honourable Order of the Bath (CB) for this important work.

== Interests ==
Openshaw had numerous interests outside of medicine. For example, he was the Master of four guilds, the Worshipful Company of Wheelwrights, the Worshipful Company of Barber-Surgeons, the Worshipful Company of Glovers and the Worshipful Company of Shipwrights. He was also an enthusiastic Freemason and was a founder member of the London Hospital Lodge, and was also a founder of lodges at his old grammar school and university. In addition, he was a Fellow of the Old Time Cyclists Club, President of the Red Spinner Angling Society, President of the Association of Lancastrians in London and an early Master of the Lancastrian Lodge.

== Later years ==
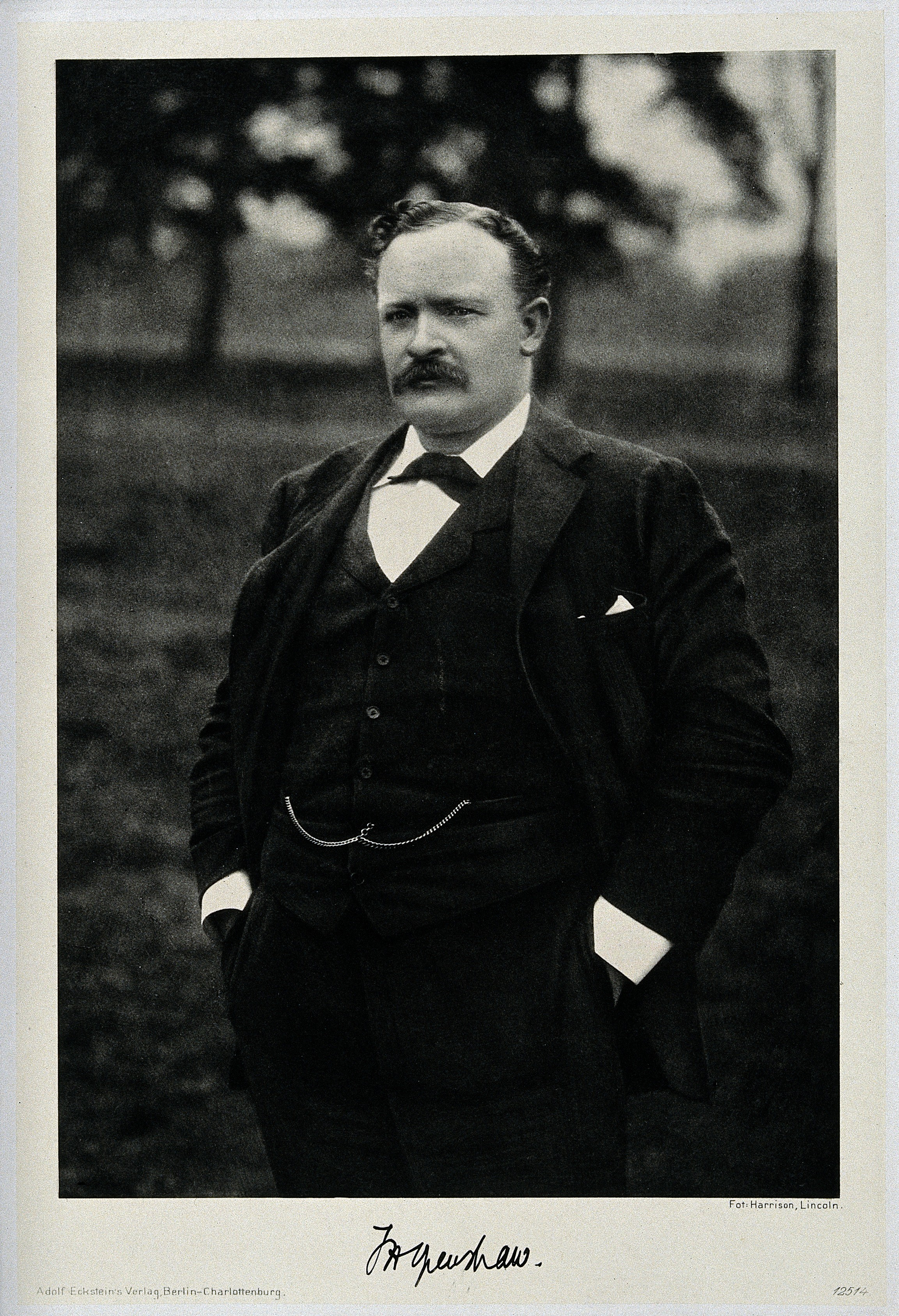
Openshaw after Harrison

Although he wrote no books or medical treatises, Openshaw was the joint editor of the Catalogue of the Pathological Collection at the London Hospital. From 1916 to 1924 he served on the Council of the Royal College of Surgeons. In addition, he was consulting surgeon to the Royal National Orthopaedic Hospital, the Poplar Hospital for Accidents, and the Cottage Hospitals of Tilbury, Sidcup and Woolwich. He was surgeon to the Royal Surgical Aid Society.

Openshaw had a son and daughter with his wife, Selina Gertrude Pratt, the daughter of William Pratt of Buern Abbey in Oxford, whom he met at the London Hospital where she had trained as a nurse. They married in 1890. His son, Major L.P. Openshaw, served in the Royal Air Force as a pilot and was killed in a mid-air collision during an air show in Bournemouth in June 1927.

A few months after his wife's death in 1929 Openshaw developed diabetes and died of pneumonia in a nursing home, aged 73.

== Openshaw Archive ==
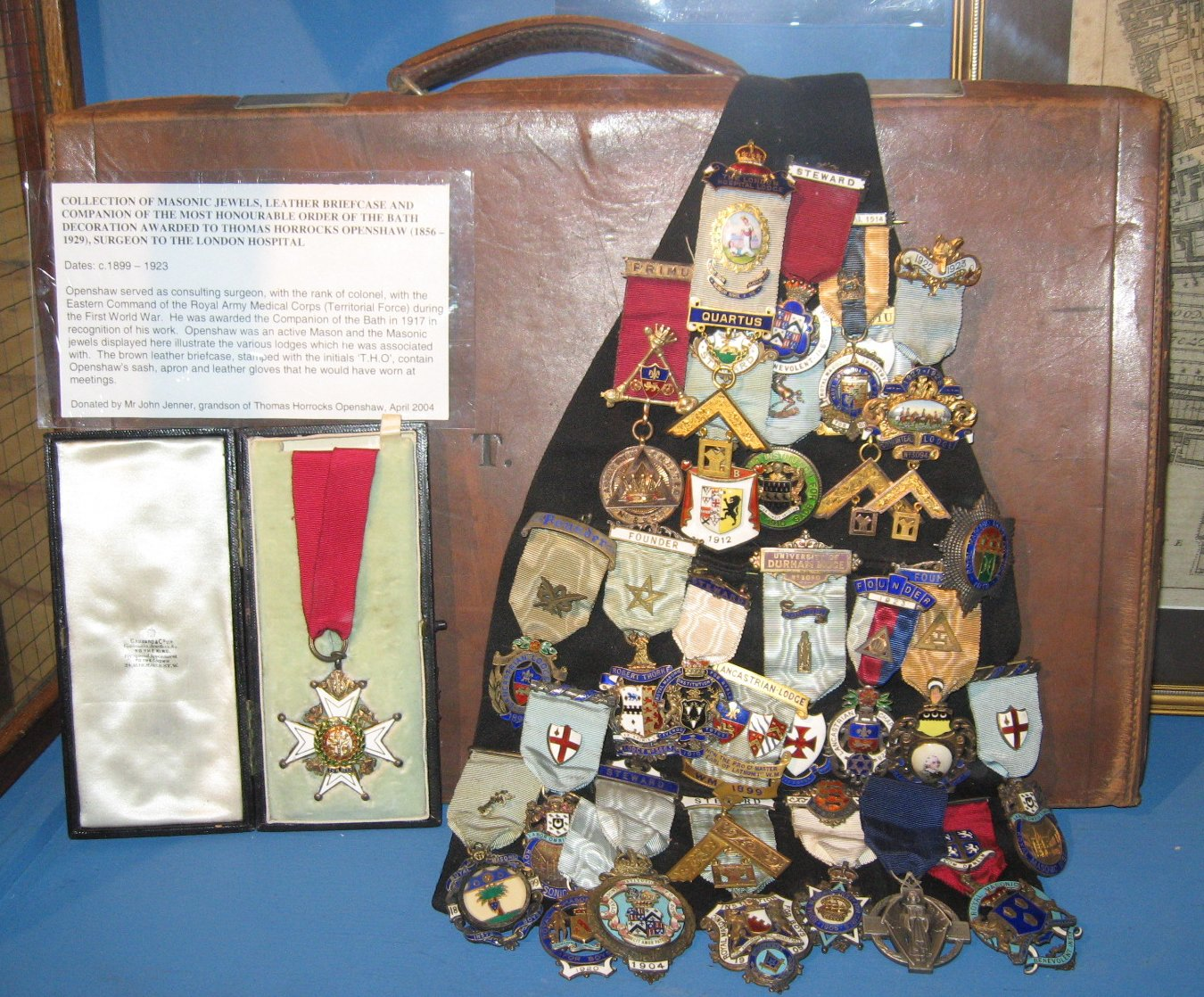
Openshaw's Companion of the Bath and his Freemasonry medals on display at the Royal London Hospital

Openshaw's photographs from the Second Boer War, his medals and certificates were donated to the Royal London Hospital Archives and Museum in 2004 by John Jenner, his grandson. A selection of Openshaw's medals and decorations were on display at the Museum until 2022.

The Museum holds Openshaw's campaign medal for the Second Boer War with bars for Cape Colony, Orange Free State and Transvaal, as well as his Queen Victoria Jubilee medal for 1897, Edward VII 1902 Ambulance Service Coronation medal, his British War Medal for service during the First World War and his Imperial Yeomanry Long Service and Good Conduct Medal.
