= From Hell letter =

Letter allegedly written by Jack the Ripper

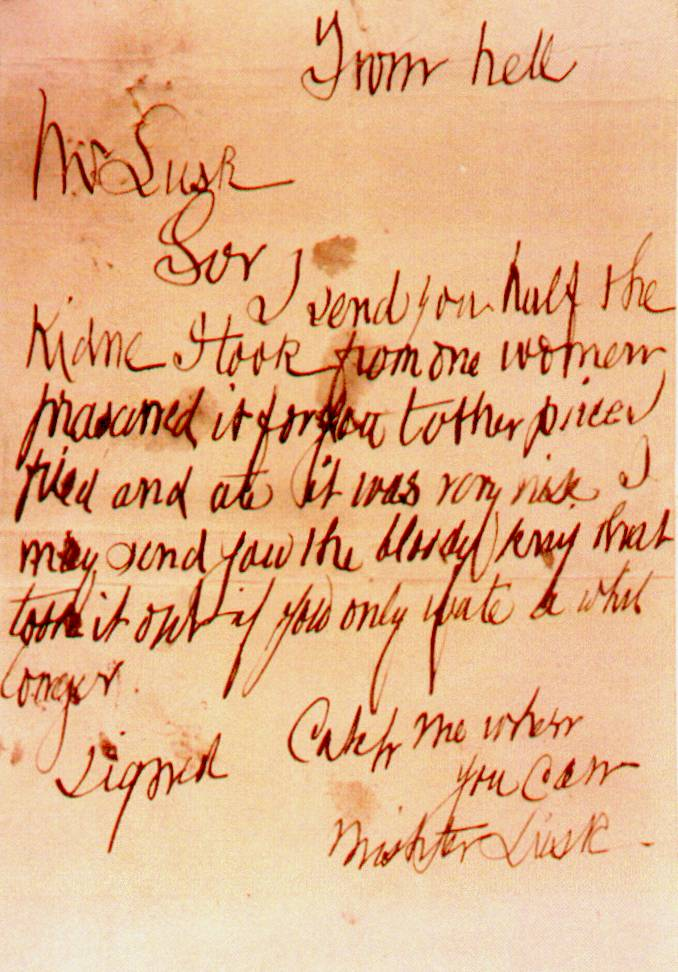
A photographic copy of the now-lost "From Hell" letter, postmarked 15 October 1888

The "From Hell" letter (also known as the "Lusk letter") was a letter sent with half of a preserved human kidney to George Lusk, the chairman of the Whitechapel Vigilance Committee, in October 1888. The author of this letter claimed to be the unidentified serial killer known as Jack the Ripper, who had murdered and mutilated at least four women in the Whitechapel and Spitalfields districts of London in the two months prior to Lusk receiving this letter, and whose vigilance committee Lusk led in civilian efforts to assist the police in identifying and apprehending the perpetrator.

The letter was postmarked 15 October 1888 and was received by Lusk the following day. An examination of the kidney revealed the individual from whom it originated had suffered from Bright's disease. The author of this letter claimed to have fried and eaten the other half.

Police, press, and public alike received many letters claiming to be from the Whitechapel Murderer, with investigators at one stage having to deal with an estimated 1,000 letters related to the case. However, the "From Hell" letter is one of the few articles of correspondence that has received serious consideration as to actually being genuine. Nonetheless, opinions remain divided with regard to the letter's authenticity.

The murders committed by Jack the Ripper have attracted much attention in popular culture for decades, with several factual and fictional works directly making reference to the "From Hell" letter.

== Background ==
The murder of Mary Ann Nichols on 31 August 1888 resulted in increased media attention focusing on the suspect known as "the Whitechapel murderer" and, later, "Leather Apron". The grotesque mutilation upon Nichols and later victims was generally described as involving their bodies having been "ripped up" and residents spoke of their worries of a "ripper" or "high rip" gang. The identification of the killer as Jack the Ripper occurred after 27 September, when the offices of Central News Ltd received the "Dear Boss" letter. The author of this letter signed the letter "Yours truly, Jack the Ripper", vowing to continue "ripping [prostitutes]" until his arrest. The author of this letter also threatened to remove and post the ears of his next victim to the police.

While newsmen considered this letter a mere joke, they decided after two days to notify Scotland Yard of the matter. The double murder of Elizabeth Stride and Catherine Eddowes took place the night that the police received the "Dear Boss" letter. The Central News people received a second communication known as the "Saucy Jacky" postcard on 1 October 1888, the day after the double murder, and the message was duly passed over to the authorities. Copies of both messages were soon posted to the public in the hopes that the writing style would be recognised. While the police felt determined to discover the author of both messages, they found themselves overwhelmed by the media circus around the Ripper killings and soon received a large amount of material, most of it useless.

== The letter ==
The letter reads:

From hell

Mr Lusk,
Sor
I send you half the Kidne I took from one women prasarved it for you tother piece I fried and ate it was very nise. I may send you the bloody knif that took it out if you only wate a whil longer
signed

Catch me when you can Mishter Lusk

=== Analysis ===
Hundreds of letters claiming to be from the killer were posted at the time of the Ripper murders, but many researchers argue that the "From Hell" letter is one of a handful of possibly authentic writings received from the murderer. The author did not sign this correspondence with the "Jack the Ripper" pseudonym, distinguishing it from the earlier "Dear Boss" letter and "Saucy Jacky" postcard, as well as their many imitators. Furthermore, the handwriting in the "Dear Boss" letter and "Saucy Jacky" postcard are markedly similar, but the handwriting of the "From Hell" letter is dissimilar. The letter was delivered to Lusk personally without reference to the police or to the British government, which could indicate animosity towards Lusk or the local Whitechapel community of which he was a member.

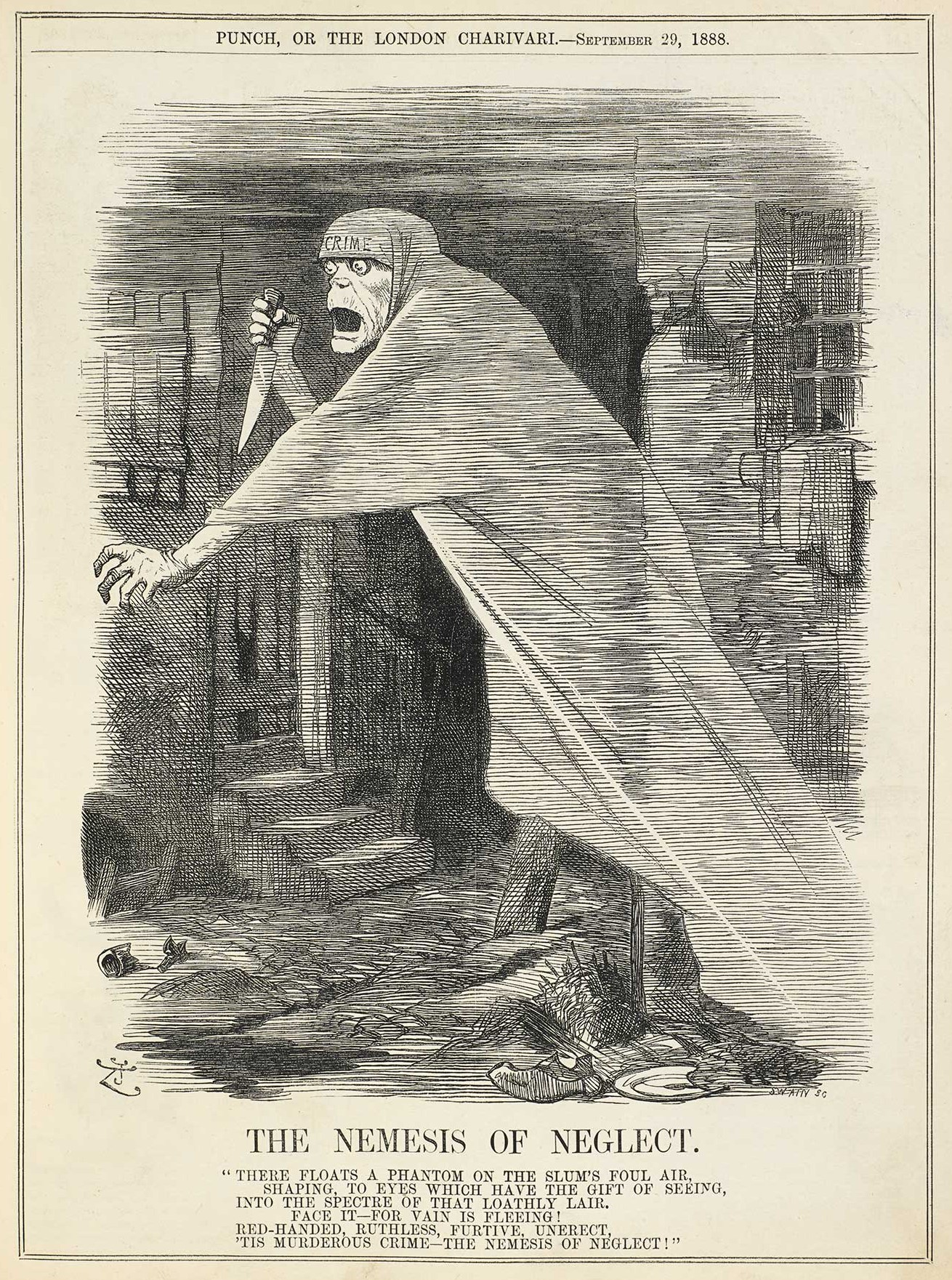
An 1888 Punch illustration depicts the murderer as a demonic spectral figure, the "Nemesis of Neglect", stalking London.

Opinions regarding the authenticity of the letter are divided. The possibility has been raised that all of the communications supposedly from the Whitechapel murderer are fraudulent, acts done by cranks or by journalists seeking to maintain the public interest in the murders and thus increase sales of their newspapers. Scotland Yard had reason to doubt the validity of the letter, yet ultimately did not take action against suspected reporters. However, the many differences between the "From Hell" letter and the vast majority of the messages received have been cited by some figures analysing the case, such as a forensic handwriting expert interviewed by the History Channel and another interviewed by the Discovery Channel, as evidence to view it as possibly the only authentic letter.

The primary reason this letter stands out more than any other is that it was delivered with a small box containing half of what doctors later determined was a human kidney which had been preserved in spirits. One of murder victim Catherine Eddowes's kidneys had been removed by the killer. Medical opinion at the time was that the organ could have been acquired by medical students and sent with the letter as part of a hoax. Lusk himself believed that this was the case and did not report the letter until he was urged to do so by friends.

Arguments in favour of the letter's genuineness sometimes state that contemporary analysis of the kidney by Dr Thomas Openshaw of the London Hospital found that it came from a sickly alcoholic woman who had died within the past three weeks, which would be consistent with Eddowes. However, these facts have been in dispute, as contemporary media reporting at the time and later recollections give contradictory information about Openshaw's opinions. Historian Philip Sugden has written that perhaps all that can be concluded, given the uncertainty, is that the kidney was human and from the left side of the body.

A contemporary police lead found that shopkeeper Emily Marsh had encountered a visitor at her shop, located in Mile End Road, with an odd, unsettling manner in both his appearance and speech. The visitor asked Marsh for the address of Mr Lusk, which he wrote in a personal notebook, before abruptly leaving. He was described as a slim man wearing a long black overcoat at about six feet in height who spoke with a distinct Irish accent, his face featuring a dark beard and moustache. While the event took place the day before Lusk received the "From Hell" message and occurred in the area in which it is considered to have been postmarked, the fact that Lusk received so many letters during this time suggests that the suspicious individual may have been another crank.

== Handwriting and linguistic analysis ==
The "From Hell" letter is written with a much lower level of literacy than other letters purporting to be from the murderer, in that this letter features numerous errors in spelling and grammar. Scholars have debated whether this is a deliberate misdirection, as the author observed the silent k in "knif[e]" and h in "whil[e]". The formatting of the letter also features a cramped writing style in which letters are pressed together haphazardly; many ink blots appear in a manner which might indicate that the writer was unfamiliar with using a pen. The formatting of the message might point to it being a hoax by a well-educated individual, but some researchers have argued that it is the genuine work of a partly functional but deranged individual.

Forensic handwriting expert Michelle Dresbold, working for the History Channel documentary series MysteryQuest, has argued that the letter is genuine, based on the peculiar characteristics of the handwriting, particularly the "invasive loop" letter "y"s. The criminal profiling experts in the programme also created a profile of the killer, stating that he possessed a deranged animosity towards women and skills in using a knife. Based on linguistic clues (including the use of the particular spelling of the word "prasarved" for "preserved"), Dresbold felt that the letter showed strong evidence that the writer was either Irish or of Irish extraction, indicating a possible link between the letter and known Ripper suspect Francis Tumblety. Tumblety was an itinerant Irish-American quack doctor who was mentally ill and who had resided in London during the year of the murders. He had had encounters with the law and a strong dislike of women, as well as a background of collecting body parts. However, after arresting him at the time as a suspect, the police ended up releasing him on bail, having failed to find hard evidence against him. He ultimately died of a heart condition in the U.S. in 1903. Sugden has also written that the author may have had an Irish background, but also stated that he may have had Cockney mannerisms.

The purported diary of James Maybrick, another man who has been proposed as a Ripper suspect, contains references to the "From Hell" letter, particularly the alleged cannibalism. However, even if the diary is assumed to be genuine, the handwriting does not match that of the letter at all. A Kirkus Reviews article has referred to the diary rumour as a "hoax" that is one of several "bizarre hypotheses" relating to the case.

== In popular culture ==
The Jack the Ripper murders are regarded as the first internationally publicised set of serial killings, with the perpetrator never conclusively identified. They have attracted much attention for decades, with fictional works referring specifically to the Lusk letter. The graphic novel From Hell, created by Alan Moore and Eddie Campbell, concerns the Ripper murders and takes its name from the letter. The work was originally published in serial form from 1989 to 1996, first collected as a single piece in 1999, and adapted into a 2001 feature film starring Johnny Depp, Ian Holm and Heather Graham. The series features the actual killer as a main protagonist, going into his tortured mind and warped justifications for the murders. Cultural commentators such as Professor Elizabeth Ho have highlighted the way in which the work comments "on the present's relationship to the past", with text and image placed "in critical tension".

== See also ==
- Jack the Ripper suspects
- Offender profiling
- Whitechapel Vigilance Committee
- List of incidents of cannibalism

== Cited works and further reading ==
- Begg, Paul (2004). Jack the Ripper: The Facts. United States: Barnes & Noble Books. ISBN 978-0-760-77121-1.
- Begg, Paul; Fido, Martin (2015) [2010]. The Complete Jack The Ripper A–Z – The Ultimate Guide to The Ripper Mystery. Marylebone: John Blake Publishing Ltd. ISBN 978-1-844-54797-5.
- Douglas, John; Olshaker, Mark (2002). The Cases That Haunt Us. New York City: Simon & Schuster. ISBN 978-0-671-01830-6.
- Evans, Stewart; Skinner, Keith (2001). Jack the Ripper: Letters From Hell. Stroud, Gloucestershire: Sutton Publishing. ISBN 978-0-7509-2549-5.
- Gibson, Dirk C. (2013). Jack the Writer: A Verbal & Visual Analysis of the Ripper Correspondence. Bentham Science Publishers. ISBN 978-1-608-05751-1.
- Jones, Richard (2008). Jack the Ripper: The Casebook. Andre Deutsch Publishing. ISBN 978-0-233-00257-6.
- Sugden, Philip (2002). The Complete History of Jack the Ripper. New York: Carroll & Graf. ISBN 978-0-7867-0932-8.
- Trow, M. J. (2019). Interpreting the Ripper Letters: Missed Clues and Reflections on Victorian Society. Barnsley: Pen & Sword Books Limited. ISBN 978-1-526-73929-2.
- Whittington-Egan, Richard (2013). Jack the Ripper: The Definitive Casebook. Stroud: Amberley Publishing. ISBN 978-1-445-61768-8.
