= George Lusk =

Chairman of the Whitechapel Vigilance Committee (1839–1919)

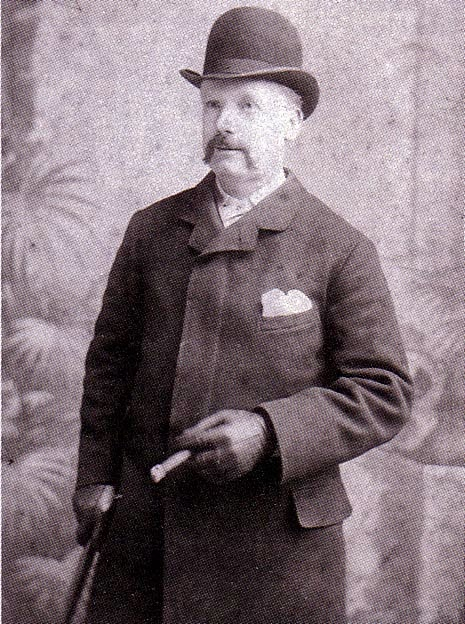
- Lusk, c. 1885
- Born: George Akin Lusk; 1839; Stepney, London, England
- Died: October 25, 1919 (aged 79–80); London, England
- Occupations: Interior decorator, chairman of the Whitechapel Vigilance Committee
- Spouse: Susannah Price (m. 1863; died 1888)
- Children: 7

George Akin Lusk (1839 – 25 October 1919) was a British builder and decorator who specialised in music hall restoration. He was the chairman of the Whitechapel Vigilance Committee during the Whitechapel murders, including the killings ascribed to Jack the Ripper, in 1888.

== Background ==
George Lusk was born in 1839, the son of Margaret Elizabeth (née Murray) and John Arthur Lusk, a solicitor's clerk. In January 1863, he married Susannah Price in Stepney. They had seven children: Albert Arthur Lusk (1863–1930); Walter Leopold Lusk (1865–1923); George Alfred Lusk (1870–1918); Edith Rose Lusk (1872–?); Maud Florence B. Lusk (1875–1967); Selina Grace Lusk (1877–?), and Lilian Violet Lusk (1881–1962).

Lusk was a Freemason, having been initiated into the Doric Lodge on 14 April 1882, but he was excluded from his membership of the Lodge in 1889 for non-payment of dues. He was also the churchwarden of his local church.

== Chairman of the Whitechapel Vigilance Committee ==
Lusk was elected chairman of the Whitechapel Vigilance Committee by other members of the committee, all local businessmen, on 10 September 1888. His name was printed on the numerous posters pasted up around Whitechapel appealing for information during the murders. He and the committee's treasurer, Joseph Aarons, wrote a letter to The Daily Telegraph, addressed to the then-Home Secretary, Henry Matthews, stating that the offer of a substantial reward from the government would "convince the poor and humble residents of our East-end that the government authorities are as much anxious to avenge the blood of these unfortunate women as they were the assassination of Lord Cavendish and Mr Burke."

== From Hell letter ==
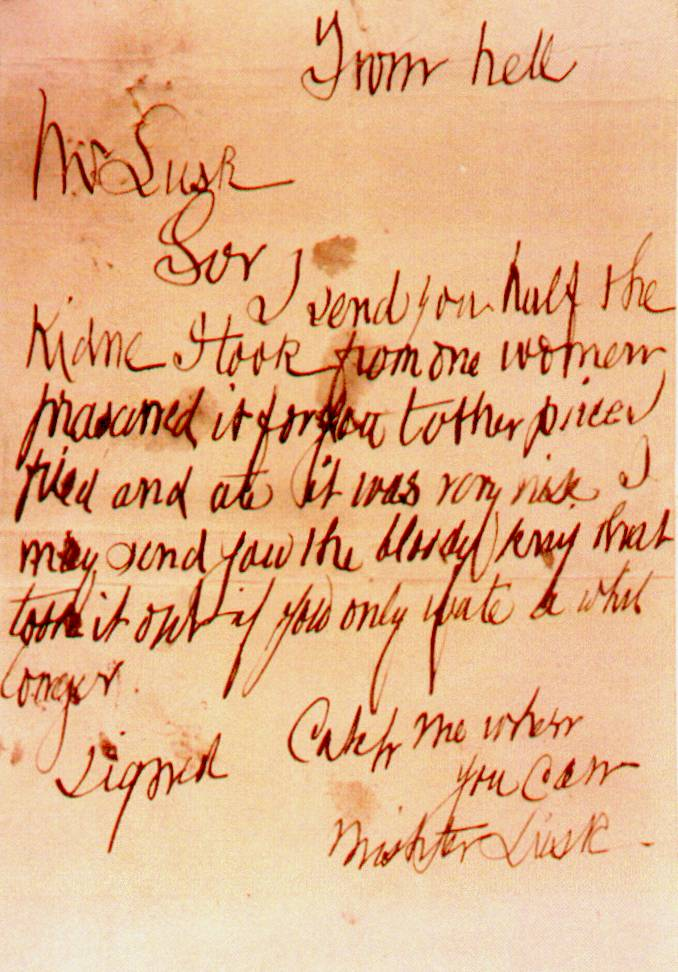
The 'From Hell' letter sent to Lusk

In October 1888 Lusk came to believe that his house was being watched by a sinister bearded man, and requested police protection. He received a small package in the evening mail at his home, 1 Alderney Road, Mile End. On opening the package he found a letter addressed to himself, inside which was half a human kidney. The letter read:

"From hell

Mr Lusk
Sor
I send you half the Kidne I took from one women prasarved it for you tother pirce I fried and ate it was very nise I may send you the bloody knif that took it out if you only wate a whil longer.

signed Catch me when
you Can
Mishter Lusk."

This letter is referred to as the "From Hell letter" by Ripperologists.

Convinced the letter was a practical joke, Lusk placed the box and the kidney in his desk drawer. At a meeting of the committee the next day he showed it to other members. Joseph Aarons, W Harris and two other members called Reeves and Lawton visited Lusk at home to inspect the letter and the kidney. Lusk wanted to throw both away, but he was persuaded to take them to Dr Frederick Wiles, who had a surgery nearby on the Mile End Road.

Wiles was out, so his assistant, F S Reed examined the contents of the box and took the kidney to Dr. Thomas Horrocks Openshaw at the nearby London Hospital. The kidney was handed over to the City Police in whose jurisdiction Catherine Eddowes had been murdered.

Lusk is also mentioned in the 17 September 1888 'Dear Boss' letter, but this letter is regarded by many Ripperologists as being a modern hoax, surreptitiously placed into archived records.

== Film and television portrayals ==
- In the 1988 made for TV film Jack the Ripper, starring Michael Caine, Lusk was played by Michael Gothard. In the film, Lusk is portrayed as a violent Marxist and power-hungry politician, though in real life he was known for his peaceful nature.
- In the 2001 film From Hell, starring Johnny Depp, Lusk was played by Vincent Franklin.
- In BBC One's Ripper Street (2013) he was played by Michael Smiley, who reconvenes the Vigilance Committee, in spite of its official disbandment, to persecute a young boy suspected of a violent murder.
