= 1888 in the United Kingdom =

Events from the year 1888 in the United Kingdom. This year is noted for the first Whitechapel murders.

== Incumbents ==
- Monarch – Victoria
- Prime Minister – Robert Gascoyne-Cecil, 3rd Marquess of Salisbury (Conservative)

== Events ==
- 26 January – the Lawn Tennis Association is founded.
- 13 February – the first issue of the Financial Times goes on sale (originally launched on 9 January by Horatio Bottomley as the London Financial Guide).
- 23 March – a meeting called by William McGregor to discuss establishment of The Football League is held in London.
- 24 March – West Bromwich Albion F.C. beat Preston North End 2–1 to win the FA cup.
- 27 March – "Goschen's Conversion" (National Debt (Conversion) Act): George Goschen, Chancellor of the Exchequer, consolidates Consolidated 3% Annuities (consols) into a new bond, 2.75% Consolidated Stock, the first change in the coupon rate since 1757.
- 3 April – London prostitute Emma Elizabeth Smith is brutally attacked by two or three men, dying of her injuries the following day, first of the Whitechapel murders but probably not a victim of Jack the Ripper.
- 28 April–3 October – 1888 British Lions tour to New Zealand and Australia: First British ("English Footballers") rugby union tour of Australasia, an unofficial predecessor of the British Lions.
- 8 May – royal opening of the International Exhibition of Science, Art and Industry in Kelvingrove Park, Glasgow (continues to November).
- 12 May – the North Borneo Chartered Company's territories (including Sarawak) become the British protectorate of North Borneo.
- 14 May – Order of Saint John chartered.
- 28 May – Celtic Football Club of Glasgow play their first official match, beating Rangers 5–2.
- 2 June – Edward King (bishop of Lincoln) is called to account for using ritualistic practices in Anglican worship.
- 11 July – snow falls across the country.
- 2–27 July – London matchgirls strike of 1888: About 200 workers, mainly teenaged girls, strike following the dismissal of three colleagues from the Bryant and May match factory, precipitated by an article on their working conditions published on 23 June by campaigning journalist Annie Besant, and the workers unionise on 27 July.
- 7 August – Whitechapel murders: the body of London prostitute Martha Tabram is found, a possible victim of Jack the Ripper.
- 9 August – Oaths Act permits all required oaths, including the oath of allegiance taken to the Sovereign by Members of Parliament, to be affirmed rather than sworn to God, thus confirming the ability of atheists to sit in the House of Commons.
- 13 August – the Local Government Act, effective from 1889, establishes county councils and county borough councils in England and Wales, redraws some county boundaries (including creation of the Soke of Peterborough as an administrative county and absorption of liberties), and gives women the vote in local elections.
- 31 August – Whitechapel murders: the mutilated body of London prostitute Mary Ann Nichols is found, perhaps the first victim of Jack the Ripper.
- 6 September – Australian cricketer Charles Turner becomes the first bowler to take 250 wickets in an English season, a feat since accomplished only by Tom Richardson (twice), J. T. Hearne, Wilfred Rhodes (twice) and Tich Freeman (six times).
- 8 September
  - Whitechapel murders: The mutilated body of London prostitute Annie Chapman is found. She is considered to be the second victim of Jack the Ripper.
  - In England, the first six Football League matches are played. The 12 members of the new league are Aston Villa, Blackburn Rovers, Bolton Wanderers, Preston North End, West Bromwich Albion, Everton, Burnley, Accrington, Wolverhampton Wanderers, Notts County, Derby County and Stoke City, all from the north of England or the midlands. The first goal in the League is scored by Kenny Davenport of Bolton Wanderers.
- 27 September – Whitechapel murders: the 'Dear Boss letter' signed "Jack the Ripper", the first time the name is used, is received by London's Central News Agency.
- 30 September – Whitechapel murders: the bodies of London prostitutes Elizabeth Stride and Catherine Eddowes, the latter mutilated, are found. They are generally considered Jack the Ripper's third and fourth victim respectively.
- October – Salt Union Ltd formed to achieve an effective monopoly over British salt production.
- 2 October – the Whitehall Mystery, one of the Thames Torso Murders: dismembered remains of a woman's body are discovered at three central London locations, one being the construction site of New Scotland Yard.
- 14 October – the first recorded film, Roundhay Garden Scene, is made in Roundhay in Leeds. The film is two seconds and 18 frames in length.
- 3 November – the Great Sheep Panic, in which thousands of sheep across Oxfordshire stampede.
- 5 November – Belfast is granted city status by Queen Victoria.
- 8 November – Joseph Assheton Fincher files a patent for the parlour game which he calls "Tiddledy-Winks".
- 9 November – Whitechapel murders: the mutilated body of London prostitute Mary Jane Kelly is found. She is considered to be the fifth, and last, of Jack the Ripper's victims. A number of similar murders in England follows, but the police attribute them to copy-cat killers.
- 7 December – John Boyd Dunlop patents the pneumatic bicycle tyre.
- 17 December – the Lyric Theatre (London) opens.
- c. December – completion of first stage of Edinburgh Museum of Science and Art.

=== Undated ===
- Camborne School of Mines founded in Cornwall.
- University College of North Wales, Bangor, opens its agriculture department – the first in a British university.
- Letitia Alice Walkington becomes the first woman in the United Kingdom to receive a degree of Bachelor of Laws, from the Royal University of Ireland at Queen's College, Belfast.
- W.D. & H.O. Wills launch the Woodbine brand of cigarette.
- The board game Snakes and Ladders is introduced from India to the U.K. by Jaques of London.

== Publications ==
- Thomas Hardy's short story collection Wessex Tales.
- W. E. Henley's A Book of Verses, containing the first publication of the poem "Invictus".
- Henry James' novella The Aspern Papers.
- Rudyard Kipling's short story collection Plain Tales from the Hills (in Calcutta).
- Mrs Humphry Ward's 'novel of doubt' Robert Elsmere.
- Oscar Wilde's collection of children's fairy stories The Happy Prince and Other Tales.

== Births ==
- 18 January – Thomas Sopwith, aviation pioneer and yachtsman (died 1989)
- 8 February – Edith Evans, actress (died 1976)
- 13 February – Desmond FitzGerald, Irish revolutionary, poet, publicist and politician (died 1947 in Ireland)
- 1 March – Ewart Astill, cricketer (Leicestershire) (died 1948)
- 2 April – Neville Cardus, writer on cricket and music (died 1975)
- 30 April – David Jacobs, Welsh athlete (died 1976)
- 17 May – Tich Freeman, cricketer (died 1965)
- 25 May – Miles Malleson, actor (died 1969)
- 7 June – Hilda Matheson, pioneering radio talks producer (died 1940)
- 15 June – Martin D'Arcy, Catholic intellectual (died 1976)
- 9 July – Simon Marks, businessman (died 1964)
- 14 August – John Logie Baird, inventor (died 1946)
- 16 August – T. E. Lawrence ("Lawrence of Arabia") liaison officer during the Arab Revolt, writer and academic (died 1935)
- 4 September – Margaret Henley, J. M. Barrie's inspiration for the name "Wendy" in Peter Pan (died 1894)
- 18 September – Grey Owl (Archibald Belaney), pioneer conservationist and imposter (died 1938 in Canada)
- 25 September – Vera Laughton Mathews, naval officer (died 1959)
- 6 December – Will Hay, actor and comedian (died 1949)
- 7 December – Joyce Cary, author (died 1957)
- 18 December – Gladys Cooper, actress (died 1971)
- 22 December – J. Arthur Rank, film magnate (died 1972)
- 25 December – Michael Sadleir, novelist (died 1957)

== Deaths ==
- 13 January – John William Inchbold, artist (born 1830)
- 29 January – Edward Lear, artist and writer (born 1812)
- 30 January – Mary Howitt, writer, poet and translator (born 1799)
- 3 February – Sir Henry Maine, legal historian (born 1822)
- 22 February – Anna Kingsford, qualified physician, anti-vivisection, health and women's rights campaigner (born 1846)
- 14 March – James Hogg, publisher (born 1806)
- 22 March – Henry Robertson, engineer and industrialist (born 1816)
- 15 April – Matthew Arnold, poet and cultural critic (born 1822)
- 19 April – Thomas Russell Crampton, engineer (born 1816)
- 8 June – Sir Duncan Cameron, general (born 1808)
- 23 June – Edmund Gurney, psychologist (born 1847)
- 31 July – Frank Holl, painter (born 1845)
- 20 August – Henry Richard, Welsh politician and peace campaigner (born 1812)
- 23 August – Philip Henry Gosse, marine biologist and creationist (born 1810)
- 10 November – George Bingham, 3rd Earl of Lucan, army officer (born 1800)
- 8 December – Frederick Apthorp Paley, classical scholar (born 1815)
- 11 December – John Rylands, weaver, entrepreneur and philanthropist (born 1801)
- 23 December – Laurence Oliphant, novelist, traveller, diplomat and Christian mystic (born 1829)
- 26 December – Alfred Vance, music hall performer (born 1839)
