= Saucy Jacky postcard =

Letter allegedly written by Jack the Ripper

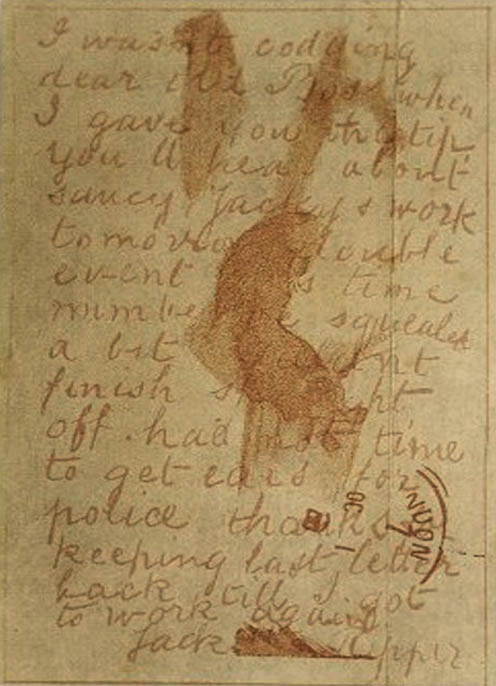
The text upon the "Saucy Jacky" postcard, dated 1 October 1888

The "Saucy Jacky" postcard is the name given to a postcard received by the Central News Agency of London and postmarked 1 October 1888. The author of the postcard claims to have been the unidentified serial killer known as Jack the Ripper.

Because so many hoax letters were received by Scotland Yard, the press and others, it is unknown whether this was an authentic letter written by the Whitechapel murderer. The postcard did contain information deemed compelling enough to lead investigators to publish a facsimile of the communication in hopes that someone might recognise the handwriting.

== Text ==
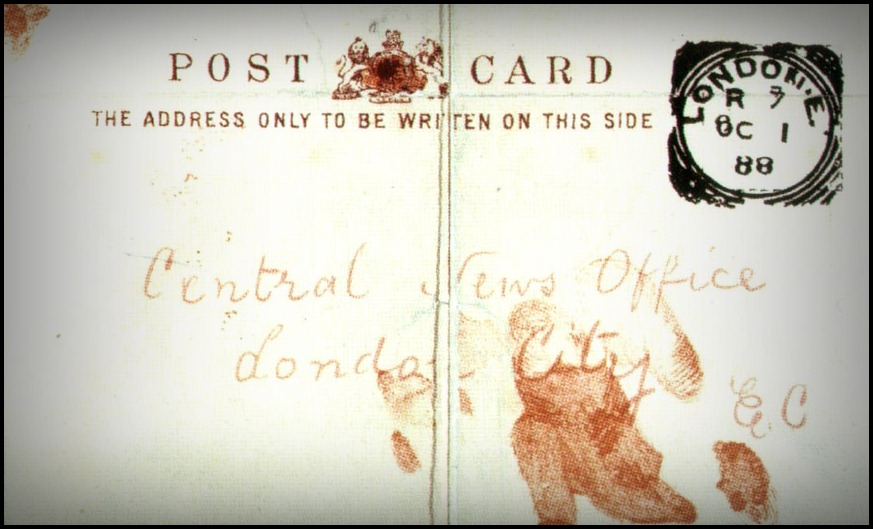
Facsimile of the front of the "Saucy Jacky" postcard

Postmarked and received on 1 October 1888, the postcard mentions that the two victims murdered on 30 September, Elizabeth Stride and Catherine Eddowes, were both killed in the early morning of 30 September and that the author had insufficient time to sever his victim's ears to send to the police as promised in a previous letter received by the Central News Agency. The lobe and auricle of Eddowes' right ear was found detached at the crime scene as a result of facial mutilations that the killer had performed, although this was not public knowledge.

The text of the postcard reads:

I was not codding dear old Boss when I gave you the tip, you'll hear about Saucy Jacky's work tomorrow double event this time number one squealed a bit couldn't finish straight off. Had not time to get ears off for police thanks for keeping last letter back till I got to work again.
Jack the Ripper

Some authors have argued that the postcard was sent before the murders were publicised, making it unlikely that any hoaxer would have such knowledge of the crime; however the correspondence was postmarked more than 24 hours after the killings had occurred, and long after many details of the murders were known by journalists and residents of the area.

== Later revelations ==
Police officials later claimed to have identified a specific journalist as the author of this postcard and the earlier "Dear Boss" letter. In 1931, journalist Fred Best of The Star claimed he and a colleague at the newspaper (apparently named Tom Bullen (Note: Chief Inspector John Littlechild is known to have stated in 1913 that senior Scotland Yard investigators had "generally believed" Bullen, whose full name was Thomas J. Bulling, to be responsible for the letters.)) had written all the letters signed "Jack the Ripper" in order to "keep the business alive".

In the years after the Ripper murders, the Saucy Jacky postcard disappeared from the police files. Although the "Dear Boss" letter was recovered in 1987, the "Saucy Jacky" postcard is still missing.

In 2018, a forensic linguistic analysis found strong linguistic evidence suggesting that this postcard and the "Dear Boss" letter were written by the same person.

== Sources ==
- "Casebook: Jack the Ripper - Ripper Letters". casebook.org.
- Evans, Stewart; Keith Skinner (2001). Jack the Ripper: Letters From Hell. Stroud: Sutton Publishing. ISBN 978-0-7509-2549-5.
- Sugden, Philip (2002). The Complete History of Jack the Ripper. New York: Carroll & Graf. ISBN 978-0-7867-0932-8.
