= Central Press =

Central Press may refer to:

- Central News Agency (London), an English news distribution service founded as Central Press in 1863
- Central Press Association, an American newspaper syndicate that operated from 1910 to 1971
