= Lambeth Pier =

Pier on the River Thames in London

Coordinates: 51.4949127°N 0.1219824°W

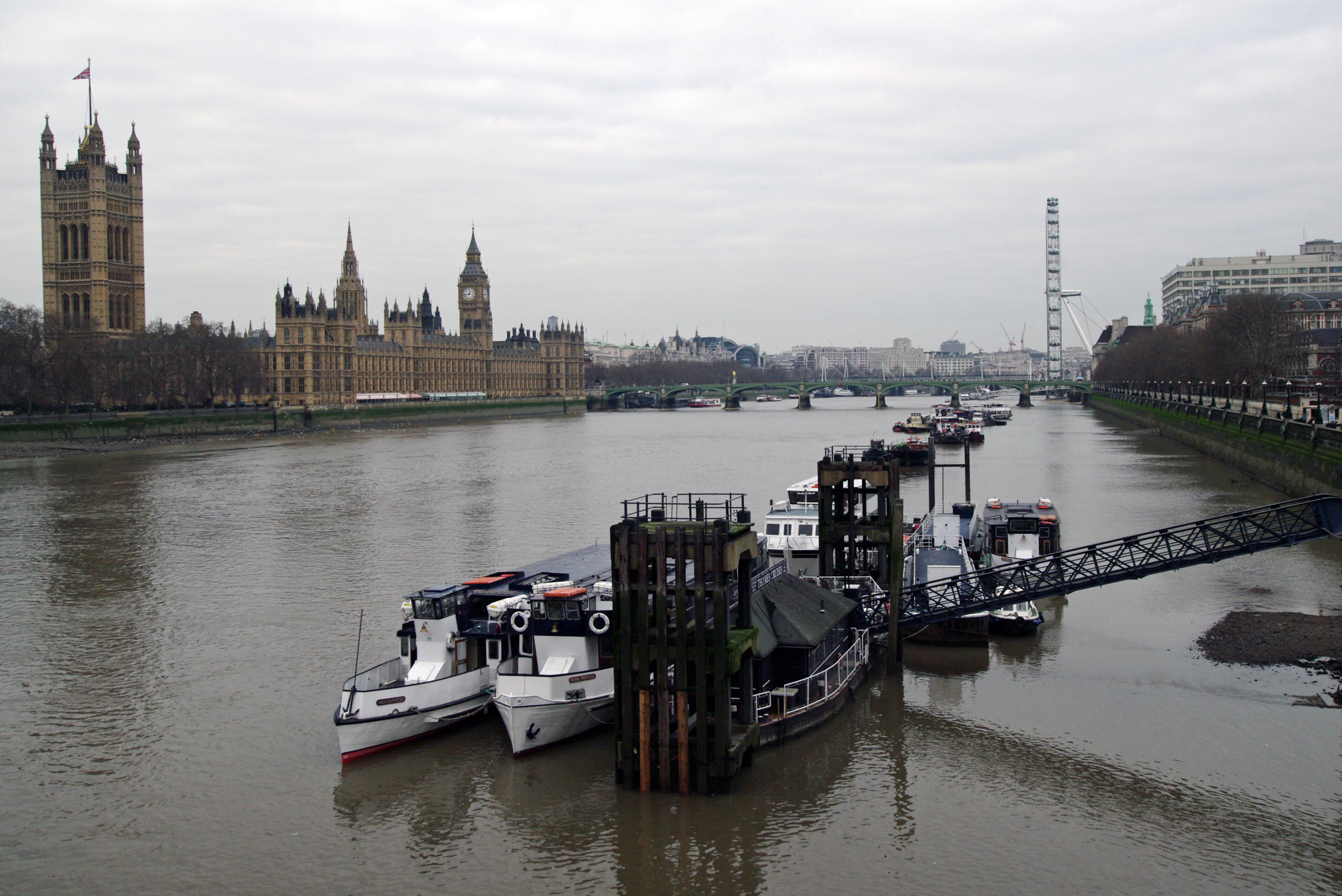
Lambeth Pier

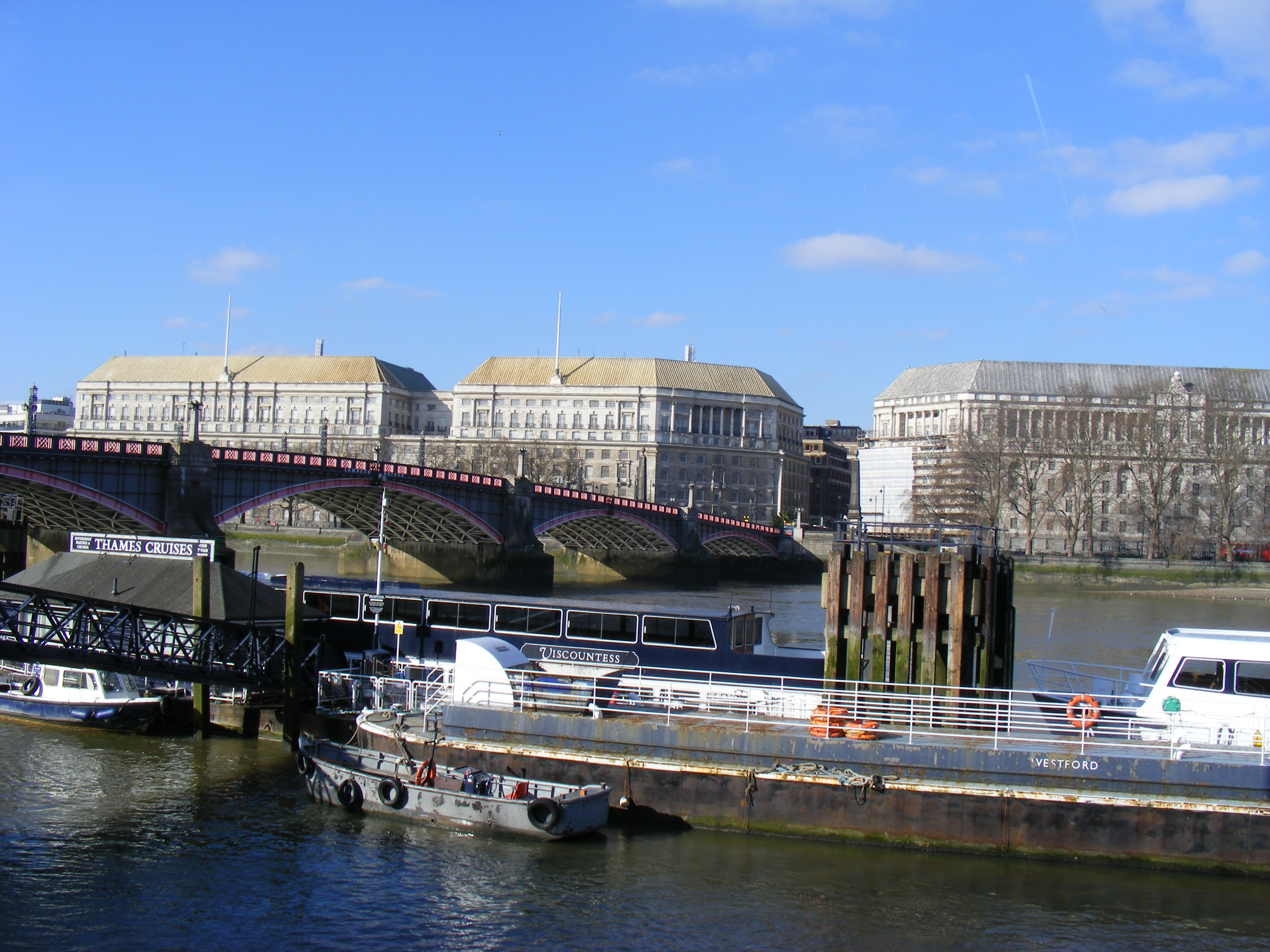
Boats docked at Lambeth Pier

Lambeth Pier is a pier on the Albert Embankment, near Lambeth Bridge, on the south side of the Thames in London, England. It has been part of a ferry service up to the mid-18th century, and now serves pleasure rides and cruises along the river.

== History ==
=== Ferry services ===
There has been a landing facility for boats here since Roman Britain. It became the primary crossing point between Lambeth Palace and Westminster Palace for the Archbishop of Canterbury. A horse ferry was in operation by 1513, as it was one of the few places along the Thames that accommodate such a service. It sank in 1633, and again in 1656 while carrying Oliver Cromwell's coach. Mary of Modena used the ferry to escape to France during the Glorious Revolution. The service closed following the opening of Westminster Bridge in 1750.

=== Leisure services ===
Since the closure of the ferry service, the pier has been used for leisure trips along the Thames. In the 19th century there were "constant stoppages" of steamboats at the pier. In 1961 Decca Radar's training school moved to the area from Blackfriars. In 1860, the pier was moved further out into the river following the construction of the Albert Embankment.

Capital Cruises were operating at Lambeth and Tower Piers by the 1980s. Today, Thames Cruises operate from the pier. Tidal Cruises has run pleasure services from Lambeth Pier since the 1980s.

== Incidents ==
On 9 October 1888, a body was found floating in the Thames, from where it was taken to Lambeth Pier and identified as a woman aged about 29, before being transported to the mortuary. Although the incident occurred at the height of the Whitechapel Murders, and the similar Whitehall Mystery murder around the same time, it is not believed to be linked to any of these.

On 20 August 1989, the Tidal Cruises-owned Marchioness sank when it collided with a dredger, killing 51 people. In 1999, 120 passengers and crew on the Symphony were evacuated at Lambeth Pier after the vessel struck Lambeth Bridge. There were no injuries.

== Charging ==
Since November 2023 it has been home to a high-voltage Shore Power connection for recharging battery powered boats.
