= Torso Murders =

Torso Murders can refer to the following murders, and Torso Killer or Torso Murderer can refer to their perpetrators:

- Cleveland Torso Murders, in the 1930s in Cleveland, Ohio, United States
- Thames Torso Murders, in the 1880s on the River Thames in London, England, United Kingdom
- Richard Cottingham, convicted New Jersey serial killer known as the "Torso Killer" believed to be responsible for multiple murders from 1967–1980 in New Jersey and New York
