= Central News Agency (London) =

English news distribution service

The Central News Agency was a news distribution service founded as Central Press in 1863 by William Saunders and his brother-in-law, Edward Spender. In 1870–71, it adopted the name Central News Agency.

By undercutting its competitors, the Press Association and Reuters, and by distributing sensational and imaginative stories, it developed a reputation amongst newsmen for "underhand practices and stories of dubious veracity". In 1895, The Times directly accused the Central News Agency of embellishing its reports, and published a comparison between the original telegrams received by the agency and those that were distributed by it. A 200-word dispatch about a naval battle in the Far East had been expanded with details of the battle though hardly any information was given in the original. The agency confirmed that words had been added, and The Times declared that: "More than two-thirds of the message was, therefore, admittedly manufactured in London."

One of its sensational and probably invented stories involved the so-called "Dear Boss" letter, dated 25 September 1888, in which a figure calling himself "Jack the Ripper" claimed responsibility for the Whitechapel murders. Police officials later claimed to have identified a specific journalist as the author of both the "Dear Boss" letter and a later postcard called the "Saucy Jacky" postcard, also supposedly written by the killer. The journalist was named as "Tom Bullen" in a letter from one of the investigating inspectors to another journalist. "Tom Bullen" was almost certainly Thomas John Bulling, who worked for Central News and claimed to have received a third letter from the Ripper in a message to police in October 1888. "Jack the Ripper" was adopted as a name to refer to the murderer, and the international media frenzy, partly fed by Central News, bestowed enduring notoriety on the killer.

That story also helped establish CNA, forcing the Press Association and all newspapers wanting to use the letters to advertise the Agency. This was under the general management and later chairmanship of John Moore, who was said by at least one London journalist of the time to have been the origin of the story. Moore was also responsible for introducing the Wright-Moore Column Printing Telegraph machine, which printed telegraph messages in columns, rather than on a single-line tape. Moore was elected chairman in 1891, having been General Manager since 1888. He retired in 1907, and was succeeded by Henry McAuliffe (later Sir), with John Gennings as Manager.
