= Whitehall Mystery =

1888 unsolved murder in London, England

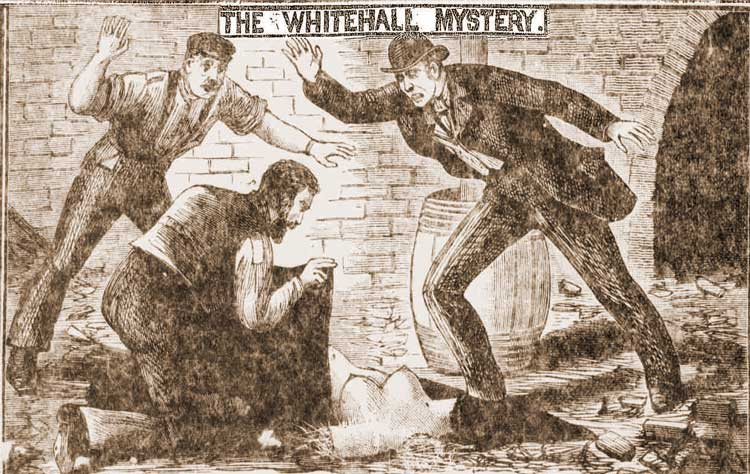
Contemporary newspaper illustration of the Whitehall Mystery, depicting the discovery of the victim's torso

The Whitehall Mystery is an unsolved murder that took place in London in 1888. The dismembered remains of a woman were discovered at three sites in the centre of the city, including the construction site of New Scotland Yard, the new police headquarters. The incident belongs to the so-called Thames Torso Murders.

== Discoveries ==
On 11 September 1888, a right arm and shoulder were discovered on the muddy shore of the River Thames in Pimlico. The Times newspaper had initially suspected that the arm was placed in the water as a medical students' prank.

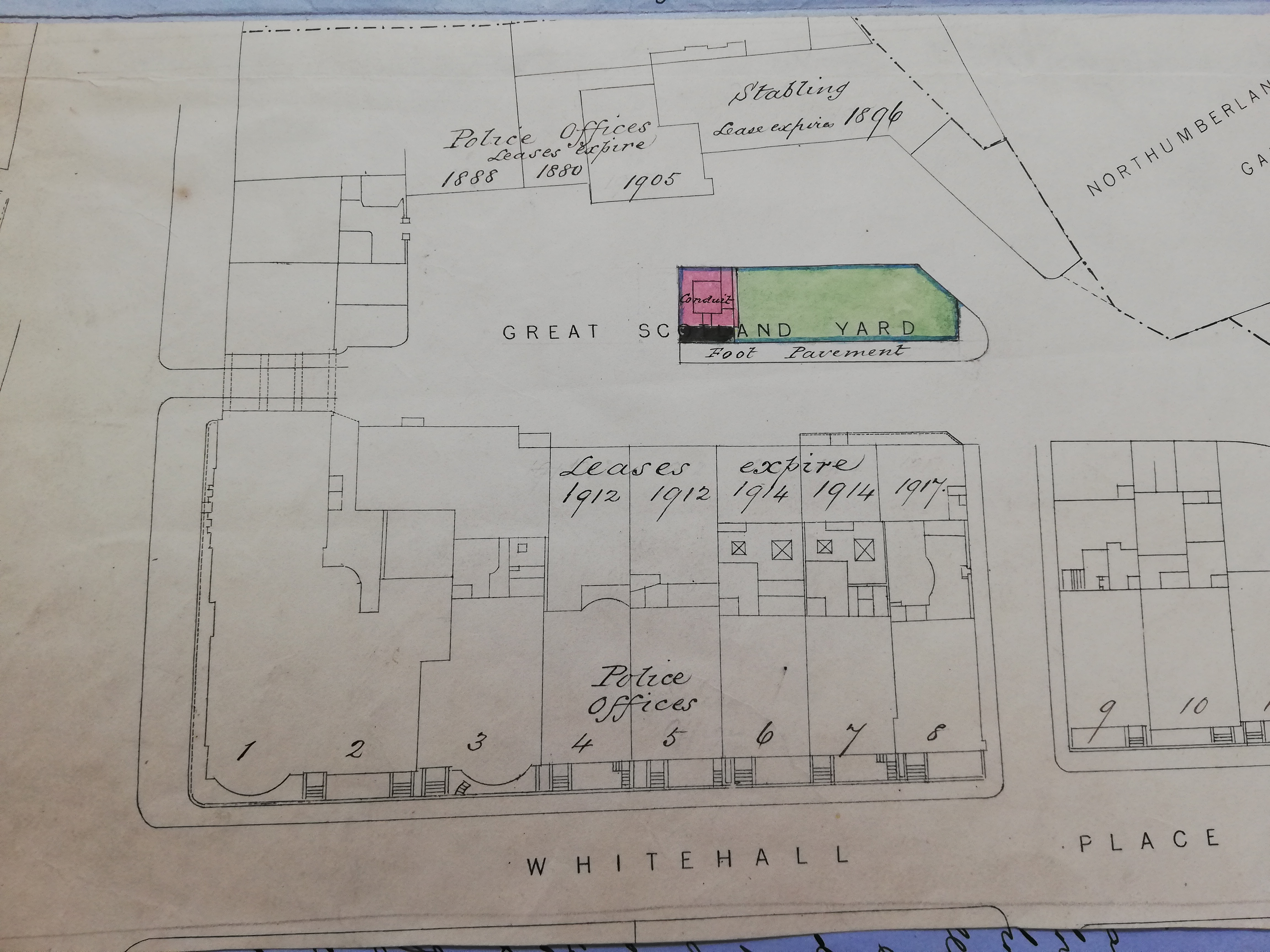
1837 illustration of the premises occupied by the Metropolitan Police

On 2 October 1888, during construction of the Metropolitan Police's new headquarters, to be known as New Scotland Yard, on the Victoria Embankment near Whitehall in Westminster, a worker found a parcel containing human remains. The female torso was discovered in a three-month-old vault that made up part of the cellar. It was placed there at some point after 29 September when Richard Lawrence, a workman, had last been inside the unlocked vault. The body had been wrapped in cloth, possibly a black petticoat, and tied with string. The torso was matched by police surgeon Thomas Bond to the previously found arm and shoulder.

On 17 October 1888, reporter Jasper Waring used a Spitsbergen dog, with the permission of the police and the help of a labourer, to find a left leg cut above the knee that was buried near the construction site.

The head and remaining limbs were never found, and the identity of the victim was never established.

== Speculation ==
Newspapers suggested a connection between this murder and the Jack the Ripper murders in and around the Whitechapel district that were occurring simultaneously, but the Metropolitan Police ruled out any connection between the cases. An inquest was opened by Westminster's coroner, John Troutbeck, on 8 October. It determined that the woman had been "of large stature and well-nourished", and suggested that she had been approximately 24 years old and 5 feet 8 inches in height. The uterus had been removed from the body. The right arm had been severed by someone with knowledge of human anatomy, had been tourniqueted to stem blood flow, and due to the lack of muscle contraction, was removed post-mortem. It was also revealed that the victim had been wearing a broché satin dress at the time of death.

The dress had been manufactured in Bradford, England, from a pattern estimated as three years old. Pieces of newspaper found with the remains were from the Echo of 24 August and an issue of the Chronicle of unknown date. Although the cause of death was unknown, the victim had not suffocated or drowned. However, the coroner was unable to exclude haemorrhaging as the cause of death.

Besides the uterus being absent, the left lung had severe pleurisy; nothing was found to indicate that the victim had borne children; the heart was healthy and the right lung, liver, stomach, kidneys and spleen were normal. She had been dead for around six weeks to two months and had fair skin and dark hair. Furthermore, the condition of the hand recovered suggested the decedent was not an individual who was accustomed to manual labour.

== Popular culture ==
The board game Whitehall Mystery (published in 2017 by Fantasy Flight Games) is based on the case. Players represent either the police (cooperating to hunt and arrest the murderer) or the culprit (who tries to evade the police and reach three locations on the board – a map of London).

It has become a point of trivia and irony that Scotland Yard was originally built (it later moved to a new location) on a crime scene related to an unsolved murder.

== See also ==
- List of unsolved murders (before the 20th century)
