= Great Sheep Panic =

Livestock disturbance across southern England

The Great Sheep Panic (also known as the Great Sheep Panic of 1888) was an event that occurred on 3 November 1888 across southern England, when tens of thousands of sheep fled from various fields across some 200 square miles of Oxfordshire.

== Event ==
At about 8 pm, thousands of sheep burst from their bonds, fields, and dwellings by a simultaneous impulse. They were found widely scattered the next morning, many of them miles away from where they had been left. Sheep were found crowded into corners of fields, and some were panting with terror under hedges. The Great Sheep Panic occurred across about 200 square miles (520 km^{2}),

The Times reported on 20 November 1888 that "malicious mischief was out of the question because a thousand men could not have frightened and released all these sheep." Another panic occurred in 1889, in Berkshire (southern England), not far from Reading.

== Possible explanation ==
In 1921, the scientific journal Nature noted that the night of 3 November 1888 had been "an intensely dark night, with occasional flashes of lightning" and explained that "panics have often occurred, for sheep are notoriously timid and nervous animals".
