= Thomas Bond (English surgeon) =

British surgeon (1841–1901)

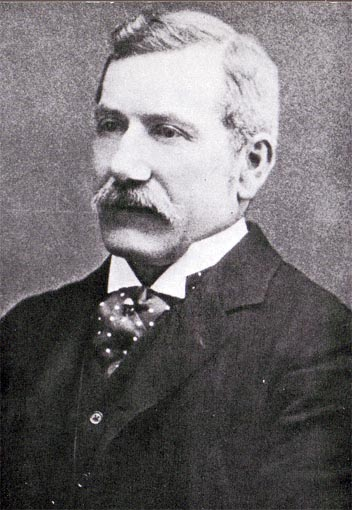
Dr Thomas Bond

Thomas Bond FRCS, MB BS (London), (7 October 1841 – 6 June 1901) was an English surgeon considered by some to be the first offender profiler, and best known for his association with the notorious Jack the Ripper murders of 1888.

== Early life ==
Born at Durston Lodge at Durston in Somerset in 1841, he was the son of Thomas Bond (1806-), a gentleman farmer, and Mary née Hearne (1810–1878). Bond was educated at King Edward VI Grammar School at Taunton. Bond was a student to his maternal uncle, Dr McCann of Southampton, before training at King's College and King's College Hospital in London where he won the Gold Medal of the University of London for his Bachelor of Surgery examination. In 1864 Bond was appointed MRCS, graduated MB BS in 1865, and in 1866 FRCS. In 1866 he joined the Prussian Military Service in which he attended the sick during a cholera epidemic. During the Austro-Prussian War he carried a despatch from the Prussian Army through the Austrian lines to the Italian lines.

== Medical career ==
Returning to London, Bond set up practice in Westminster, and was appointed Surgeon to the Metropolitan Police's A Division (Westminster) in 1867. He won a post at the Westminster Hospital in 1873 after several failed elections, and he spent his entire career at that hospital, firstly as an assistant surgeon and, from 1895, as a Full Surgeon.

As surgeon to the Metropolitan Police's 'A Division' he dealt with many important cases, including those of the Battersea Mystery, Mary Jane Kelly, Kate Webster, Percy Lefroy Mapleton and the "Thames Torso Murders" investigations of 1887–1889. Bond also examined the bodies of Rose Mylett and Alice Mackenzie and submitted reports on both. Bond was described as being among the best of medical witnesses as his evidence was always clear. Bond was an early offender profiler, and attempted to profile the personality of Jack the Ripper in 1888.

Bond was railway surgeon or consulting railway surgeon to the Great Western Railway and the Great Eastern Railway. Bond's function for the railways was primarily as medico-legal consultant regarding injury claims rather than practical surgery. He did, however, treat the injured of an overturned train on which he was himself a passenger. Bond's last major work for the railways was investigations in connection with the Slough rail accident of 1900. Bond also wrote a lengthy article on railway injuries for Heath's Dictionary of Practical Surgery.

== Jack the Ripper ==
On 25 October 1888, Robert Anderson wrote to Bond asking him to examine material connected with the Jack the Ripper investigation. In his letter Anderson enclosed copies of the evidence given at the inquests into the murders of Polly Nichols, Annie Chapman, Elizabeth Stride and Catherine Eddowes, and asked Bond to deliver his "opinion on the matter."

Bond examined the papers for two weeks and replied to Anderson on 10 November 1888. Mary Jane Kelly had been killed the morning before in Dorset Street, and Bond had spent much of that day performing her autopsy.

Bond's report said:

"I beg to report that I have read the notes of the 4 Whitechapel Murders viz:

1. Buck's Row.
2. Hanbury Street.
3. Berner's Street.
4. Mitre Square.

I have also made a Post Mortem Examination of the mutilated remains of a woman found yesterday in a small room in Dorset Street –

1. All five murders were no doubt committed by the same hand. In the first four the throats appear to have been cut from left to right. In the last case owing to the extensive mutilation it is impossible to say in what direction the fatal cut was made, but arterial blood was found on the wall in splashes close to where the woman's head must have been lying.

2. All the circumstances surrounding the murders lead me to form the opinion that the women must have been lying down when murdered and in every case the throat was first cut.

3. In the four murders of which I have seen the notes only, I cannot form a very definite opinion as to the time that had elapsed between the murder and the discovering of the body.

In one case, that of Berner's Street, the discovery appears to have been made immediately after the deed - In Buck's Row, Hanbury Street, and Mitre Square three or four hours only could have elapsed. In the Dorset Street case the body was lying on the bed at the time of my visit, 2 o'clock, quite naked and mutilated as in the annexed report -

Rigor Mortis had set in, but increased during the progress of the examination. From this it is difficult to say with any degree of certainty the exact time that had elapsed since death as the period varies from 6 to 12 hours before rigidity sets in. The body was comparatively cold at 2 o'clock and the remains of a recently taken meal were found in the stomach and scattered about over the intestines. It is, therefore, pretty certain that the woman must have been dead about 12 hours and the partly digested food would indicate: that death took place about 3 or 4 hours after the food was taken, so one or two o'clock in the morning would be the probable time of the murder.

4. In all the cases there appears to be no evidence of struggling and the attacks were probably so sudden and made in such a position that the women could neither resist nor cry out. In the Dorset Street case the corner of the sheet to the right of the woman's head was much cut and saturated with blood, indicating that the face may have been covered with the sheet at the time of the attack.

5. In the four first cases the murderer must have attacked from the right side of the victim. In the Dorset Street case, he must have attacked from in front or from the left, as there would be no room for him between the wall and the part of the bed on which the woman was lying. Again, the blood had flowed down on the right side of the woman and spurted on to the wall.

6. The murderer would not necessarily be splashed or deluged with blood, but his hands' and arms must have been covered and parts of his clothing must certainly have been smeared with blood.

7. The mutilations in each case excepting the Berner's Street one were all of the same character and shewed clearly that in all the murders, the object was mutilation.

8. In each case the mutilation was inflicted by a person who had no scientific nor anatomical knowledge. In my opinion he does not even possess the technical knowledge of a butcher or horse slaughterer or any person accustomed to cut up dead animals.

9. The instrument must have been a strong knife at least six inches long, very sharp, pointed at the top and about an inch in width. It may have been a clasp knife, a butcher's knife or a surgeon's knife. I think it was no doubt a straight knife.

10. The murderer must have been a man of physical strength and of great coolness and daring. There is no evidence that he had an accomplice. He must in my opinion be a man subject to periodical attacks of Homicidal and erotic mania. The character of the mutilations indicate that the man may be in a condition sexually, that may be called satyriasis. It is of course possible that the Homicidal impulse may have developed from a revengeful or brooding condition of the mind, or that Religious Mania may have been the original disease, but I do not think either hypothesis is likely. The murderer in external appearance is quite likely to be a quiet inoffensive looking man probably middleaged and neatly and respectably dressed. I think he must be in the habit of wearing a cloak or overcoat or he could hardly have escaped notice in the streets if the blood on his hands or clothes were visible.

11. Assuming the murderer to be such a person as I have just described he would probably be solitary and eccentric in his habits, also he is most likely to be a man without regular occupation, but with some small income or pension. He is possibly living among respectable persons who have some knowledge of his character and habits and who may have grounds for suspicion that he is not quite right in his mind at times. Such persons would probably be unwilling to communicate suspicions to the Police for fear of trouble or notoriety, whereas if there were a prospect of reward it might overcome their scruples.

I am, Dear Sir,
Yours faithfully,
Thos. Bond.

== Later years ==
The suicide of Dr Thomas Bond in 1901 - The Penny Illustrated Paper 15 June 1901

Bond married twice; firstly in 1870 to Rosa Sophia Hayes (1844–1899) a daughter of Mr. Justice Hayes, with whom he had six children: Lucy Elizabeth Bond (1872–1940, who married the music educator Percy Buck in 1896); Mabel Alice Bond (1874–1961); Mary H H Bond (1878–); Harold Thomas Hearne Bond (1879–1941); Arthur G H Bond (1881–), and Ivor Reginald Beviss Bond (1886–1960). In 1900 he married his second wife, Mrs. Louisa Dashwood Nairne Imrie (1849-), daughter of the late Mr. Lancelot Dashwood of Overstrand.

A keen huntsman, Bond rode with the Badminton Hounds at Chippenham and the Devon and Somerset Staghounds on Exmoor. He once recommended a tired City businessman: 'You will hunt with the Devon & Somerset staghounds three days a week in August and four in September, and you will drink each alternate evening a pint of Champagne and a pint of Burgundy.’ He was also a regular judge at horse shows.

At age 59, Bond committed suicide on 6 June 1901 when, clad only in his nightdress, he threw himself from a bedroom window of his home at 7, the Sanctuary, Westminster, following a long period of insomnia caused by pain he had been suffering since middle-age, and which he had treated with narcotics.

Thomas Bond was buried in Orchard Portman churchyard in Somerset.
