= Jack the Ripper =

Unidentified serial killer in London in 1888

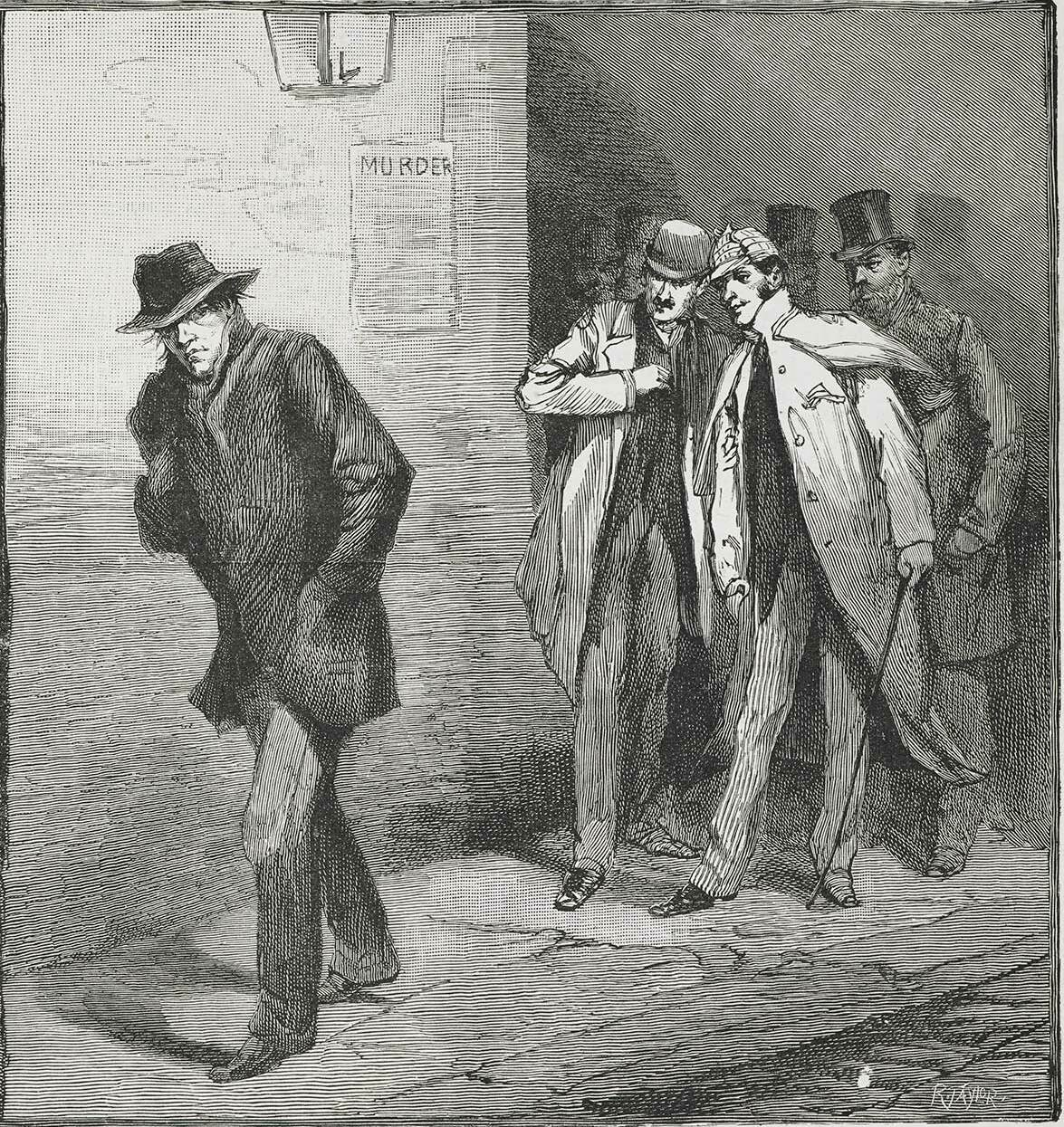
- "With the Vigilance Committee in the East End: A Suspicious Character" from The Illustrated London News, 13 October 1888
- Other names: "The Whitechapel Murderer"; "Leather Apron"

Details
- Victims: Unknown (5 canonical)
- Date: 1888–1891 (1888: 5 canonical)
- Locations: Whitechapel and Spitalfields, London, England (5 canonical)

Jack the Ripper was an unidentified serial killer active in and around the impoverished Whitechapel district of the East End of London, in 1888. In both criminal case files and the contemporaneous journalistic accounts, the killer was also called the Whitechapel Murderer and Leather Apron.

Attacks ascribed to Jack the Ripper typically involved women working as prostitutes who lived in the slums of the East End of London. Their throats were cut prior to abdominal mutilations. The removal of internal organs from at least three of the victims led to speculation that the killer had some anatomical or surgical knowledge. Rumours that the murders were connected intensified in September and October 1888, and numerous letters were received by media outlets and Scotland Yard from people purporting to be the murderer.

The name "Jack the Ripper" originated in the "Dear Boss letter" written by someone claiming to be the murderer, which was disseminated in the press. The letter is widely believed to have been a hoax and may have been written by journalists to heighten interest in the story and increase their newspapers' circulation. Another, the "From Hell letter", was received by George Lusk of the Whitechapel Vigilance Committee and came with half a preserved human kidney, purportedly taken from one of the victims. The public came to believe in the existence of a single serial killer known as Jack the Ripper, mainly because of both the extraordinarily brutal nature of the murders and extensive media coverage of the crimes.

Extensive newspaper coverage bestowed enduring international notoriety on the Ripper, and the legend solidified. A police investigation into a series of eleven brutal murders committed in Whitechapel and Spitalfields between 1888 and 1891 was unable to connect all the killings conclusively to the 1888 murders. Five victims – Mary Ann Nichols, Annie Chapman, Elizabeth Stride, Catherine Eddowes and Mary Jane Kelly – are known as the "canonical five", and their murders between 31 August and 9 November 1888 are often considered the most likely to be linked. The murders were never solved, and the legends surrounding these crimes have since become a combination of historical research, folklore and pseudohistory, capturing public imagination to the present day.

== Background ==
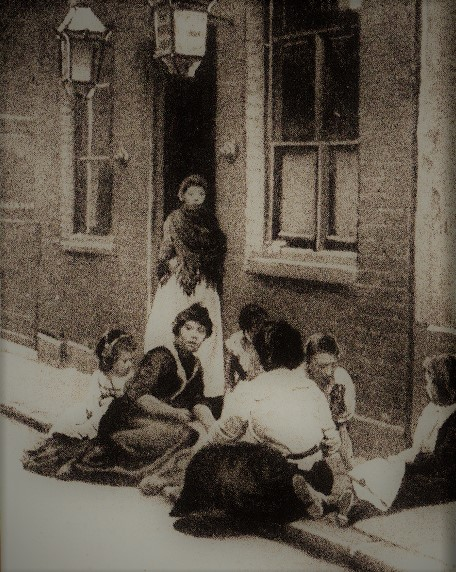
Women and children congregate in front of one of the Whitechapel common lodging-houses close to where Jack the Ripper murdered two of his victims.

In the mid-19th century, England experienced an influx of Irish immigrants who swelled the populations of the major cities, including the East End of London. From 1882, Jewish refugees fleeing pogroms in the Russian Empire and other parts of Eastern Europe immigrated into the same area. The parish of Whitechapel in the East End became increasingly overcrowded, with the population rising to approximately 80,000 inhabitants by 1888. Work and housing conditions deteriorated, and a substantial economic underclass developed. Fifty-five per cent of children born in the East End died before the age of five. Robbery, violence, and alcohol dependency were commonplace, and the endemic poverty drove many women to prostitution to survive on a daily basis.

In October 1888, London's Metropolitan Police Service estimated that there were 62 brothels and 1,200 women working as prostitutes in Whitechapel. Approximately 8,500 people resided in the 233 common lodging-houses within Whitechapel every night, with the nightly price for a coffin bed being fourpence (equivalent to £2 in 2025) and the cost of sleeping upon a "lean-to" or "hang-over" rope stretched across the dormitory being two pence per person.

The economic problems in Whitechapel were accompanied by a steady rise in social tensions. Between 1886 and 1889, frequent demonstrations led to police intervention and public unrest, such as Bloody Sunday (1887). Antisemitism, crime, nativism, racism, social unrest, and severe deprivation influenced public perceptions that Whitechapel was a notorious den of immorality. These perceptions were strengthened in 1888 when the series of vicious and grotesque murders attributed to "Jack the Ripper" received unprecedented coverage in the media.

== Murders ==
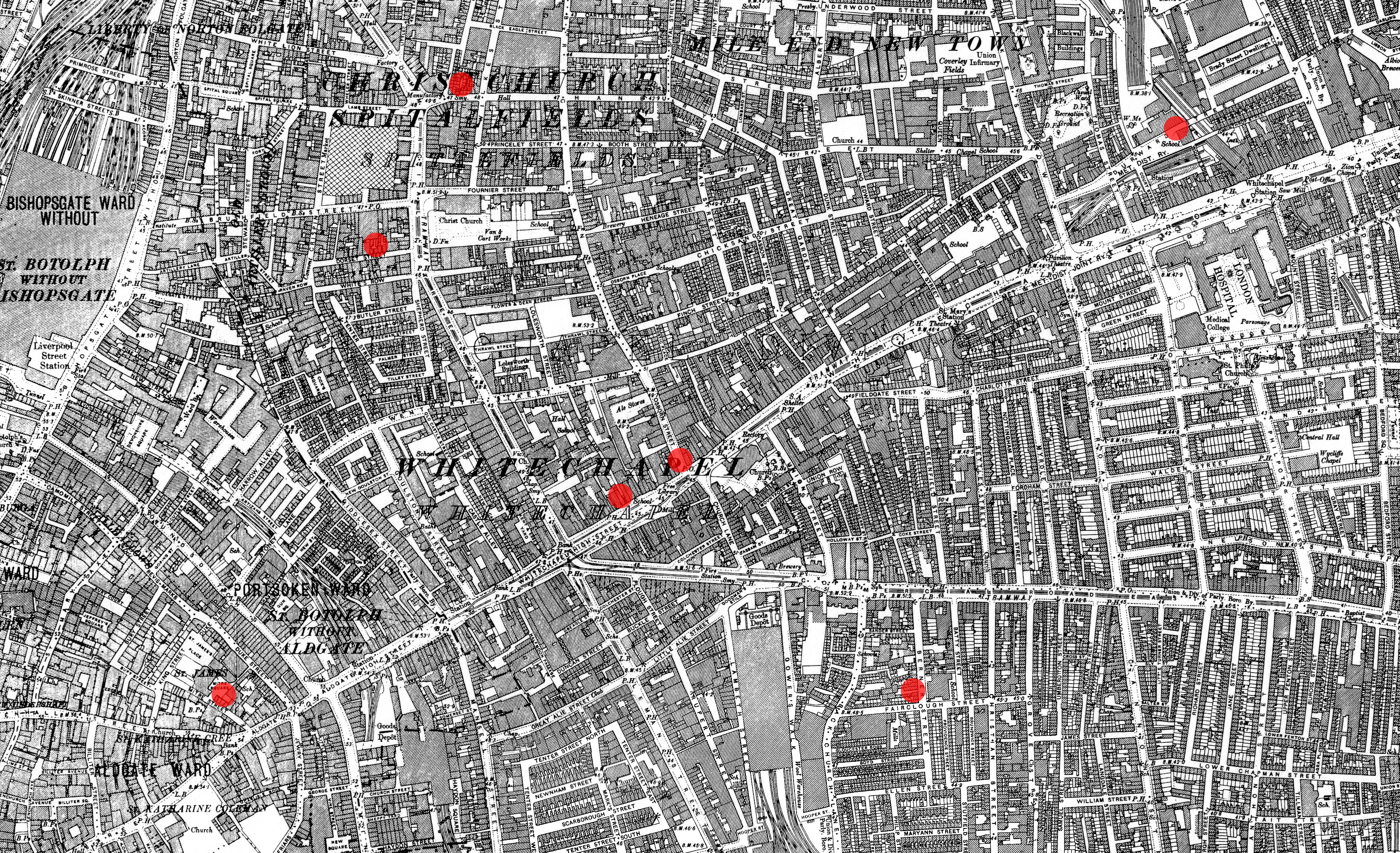
The sites of the first seven Whitechapel murders – Osborn Street (centre right), George Yard (centre left), Hanbury Street (top), Buck's Row (far right), Berner Street (bottom right), Mitre Square (bottom left), and Dorset Street (middle left)

The large number of attacks against women in the East End during this time adds uncertainty to how many victims were murdered by the same person. Eleven separate murders, stretching from 3 April 1888 to 13 February 1891, were included in a Metropolitan Police investigation and were known collectively in the police docket as the "Whitechapel murders". Opinions vary as to whether these murders should be linked to the same culprit, but five of the eleven Whitechapel murders, known as the "canonical five", are widely believed to be the work of the Ripper. Most experts point to deep slash wounds to the throat, followed by extensive abdominal and genital-area mutilation, the removal of internal organs, and progressive facial mutilations as the distinctive features of the Ripper's modus operandi. The first two cases in the Whitechapel murders file, those of Emma Elizabeth Smith and Martha Tabram, are not included in the canonical five.

Smith was robbed and sexually assaulted in Osborn Street, Whitechapel, at approximately 1:30 am on 3 April 1888. She had been bludgeoned about the face and received a cut to her ear. A blunt object was also inserted into her vagina, rupturing her peritoneum. She developed peritonitis and died the following day at London Hospital. Smith stated that she had been attacked by two or three men, one of whom she described as a teenager. This attack was linked to the later murders by the press, but most authors attribute this murder to general East End gang violence unrelated to the Ripper case.

Tabram was murdered on a staircase landing in George Yard, Whitechapel, on 7 August 1888; she had suffered 39 stab wounds to her throat, lungs, heart, liver, spleen, stomach, and abdomen, with additional knife wounds inflicted to her breasts and vagina. All but one of Tabram's wounds had been inflicted with a bladed instrument such as a penknife, and with one possible exception, all the wounds had been inflicted by a right-handed person.

The savagery of the Tabram murder, the lack of an obvious motive, and the closeness of the location and date to the later canonical Ripper murders led police to link this murder to those later committed by Jack the Ripper. However, this murder differs from the later canonical murders because although Tabram had been repeatedly stabbed, she had not suffered any slash wounds to her throat or abdomen. Many experts do not connect Tabram's murder with the later murders because of this difference in the wound pattern.

=== Canonical five ===
The "canonical five" Ripper victims are Mary Ann Nichols, Annie Chapman, Elizabeth Stride, Catherine Eddowes, and Mary Jane Kelly.

The body of Mary Ann Nichols was discovered at about 3:40 am on Friday 31 August 1888 in Buck's Row (now Durward Street), Whitechapel. Nichols had last been seen alive approximately one hour before the discovery of her body by a Mrs. Emily Holland, with whom she had previously shared a bed at a common lodging-house in Thrawl Street, Spitalfields, walking in the direction of Whitechapel Road. Her throat was severed by two deep cuts, one of which completely severed all the tissue down to the vertebrae. Her vagina had been stabbed twice, and the lower part of her abdomen was partly ripped open by a deep, jagged wound, causing her bowels to protrude. Several other incisions inflicted to both sides of her abdomen had also been caused by the same knife; each of these wounds had been inflicted in a downward thrusting manner.

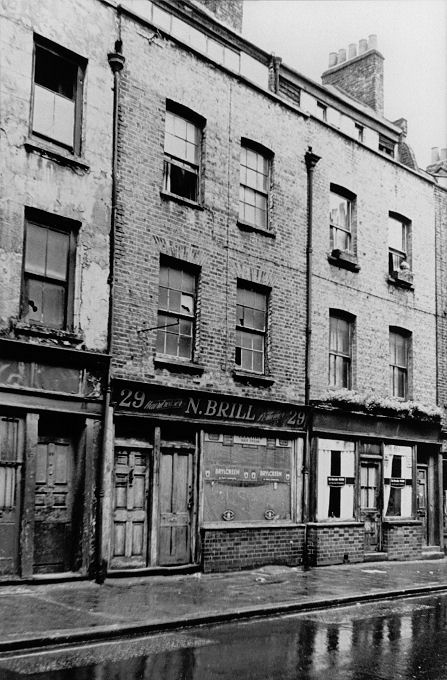
29 Hanbury Street. The door through which Annie Chapman and her murderer walked to the yard where her body was discovered is beneath the numerals of the property sign.

One week later, on Saturday 8 September 1888, the body of Annie Chapman was discovered at approximately 6 am near the steps to the doorway of the back yard of 29 Hanbury Street, Spitalfields. As in the case of Nichols, the throat was severed by two deep cuts. Her abdomen had been cut entirely open, with a section of the flesh from her stomach being placed upon her left shoulder and another section of skin and flesh – plus her small intestines – being removed and placed above her right shoulder. Chapman's autopsy also revealed that her uterus and sections of her bladder and vagina had been removed.

At the inquest into Chapman's murder, Elizabeth Long described having seen Chapman standing outside 29 Hanbury Street at about 5:30 am in the company of a dark-haired man wearing a brown deerstalker hat and dark overcoat, and of a "shabby-genteel" appearance. According to this eyewitness, the man had asked Chapman, "Will you?" to which Chapman had replied, "Yes."

Elizabeth Stride and Catherine Eddowes were both killed in the early morning hours of Sunday 30 September 1888. Stride's body was discovered at approximately 1 am in Dutfield's Yard, off Berner Street (now Henriques Street) in Whitechapel. The cause of death was a single clear-cut incision, measuring six inches across her neck which had severed her left carotid artery and her trachea before terminating beneath her right jaw. The absence of any further mutilations to her body has led to uncertainty as to whether Stride's murder was committed by the Ripper, or whether he was interrupted during the attack. Several witnesses later informed police they had seen Stride in the company of a man in or close to Berner Street on the evening of 29 September and in the early hours of 30 September, but each gave differing descriptions: some said that her companion was fair, others dark; some said that he was shabbily dressed, others well-dressed.

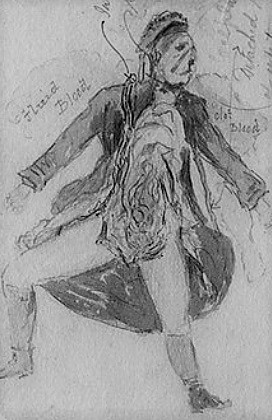
Contemporaneous police drawing of the body of Catherine Eddowes, as discovered in Mitre Square

Eddowes's body was found in a corner of Mitre Square in the City of London, three-quarters of an hour after the discovery of the body of Elizabeth Stride. Her throat was severed from ear to ear and her abdomen ripped open by a long, deep and jagged wound before her intestines had been placed over her right shoulder, with a section of the intestine being completely detached and placed between her body and left arm.

The left kidney and the major part of Eddowes's uterus had been removed, and her face had been disfigured, with her nose severed, her cheek slashed, and cuts measuring a quarter of an inch and a half an inch respectively vertically incised through each of her eyelids. A triangular incision – the apex of which pointed towards Eddowes's eye – had also been carved upon each of her cheeks, and a section of the auricle and lobe of her right ear was later recovered from her clothing. The police surgeon who conducted the post mortem upon Eddowes's body stated his opinion these mutilations would have taken "at least five minutes" to complete.

A local cigarette salesman named Joseph Lawende had passed by a narrow walkway to Mitre Square named Church Passage with two friends shortly before the murder; he later described seeing a fair-haired man of medium build with a shabby appearance with a woman who may have been Eddowes. Lawende's companions were unable to confirm his description. The murders of Stride and Eddowes ultimately became known as the "double event".

A section of Eddowes's bloodied apron was found at the entrance to a tenement in Goulston Street, Whitechapel, at 2:55 am. A chalk inscription upon the wall directly above this piece of apron read: "The Juwes are The men That Will not be Blamed for nothing." This graffito became known as the Goulston Street graffito. The message appeared to imply that a Jew or Jews in general were responsible for the series of murders, but it is unclear whether the graffito was written by the murderer on dropping the section of apron, or was merely incidental and nothing to do with the case. Such graffiti were commonplace in Whitechapel. Sir Charles Warren, the Police Commissioner, feared that the graffito might spark antisemitic riots and ordered the writing washed away before dawn.

The extensively mutilated and disembowelled body of Mary Jane Kelly was discovered lying on the bed in the single room where she lived at 13 Miller's Court, off Dorset Street, Spitalfields, at 10:45 am on Friday 9 November 1888. Her face had been "hacked beyond all recognition", with her throat severed down to the spine, and the abdomen almost emptied of its organs. Her uterus, kidneys and one breast had been placed beneath her head, and other viscera from her body placed beside her foot, about the bed and sections of her abdomen and thighs upon a bedside table. The heart was missing from the crime scene. Multiple ashes found within the fireplace at 13 Miller's Court suggested Kelly's murderer had burned several combustible items to illuminate the single room as he mutilated her body. A recent fire had been severe enough to melt the solder between a kettle and its spout, which had fallen into the grate of the fireplace.

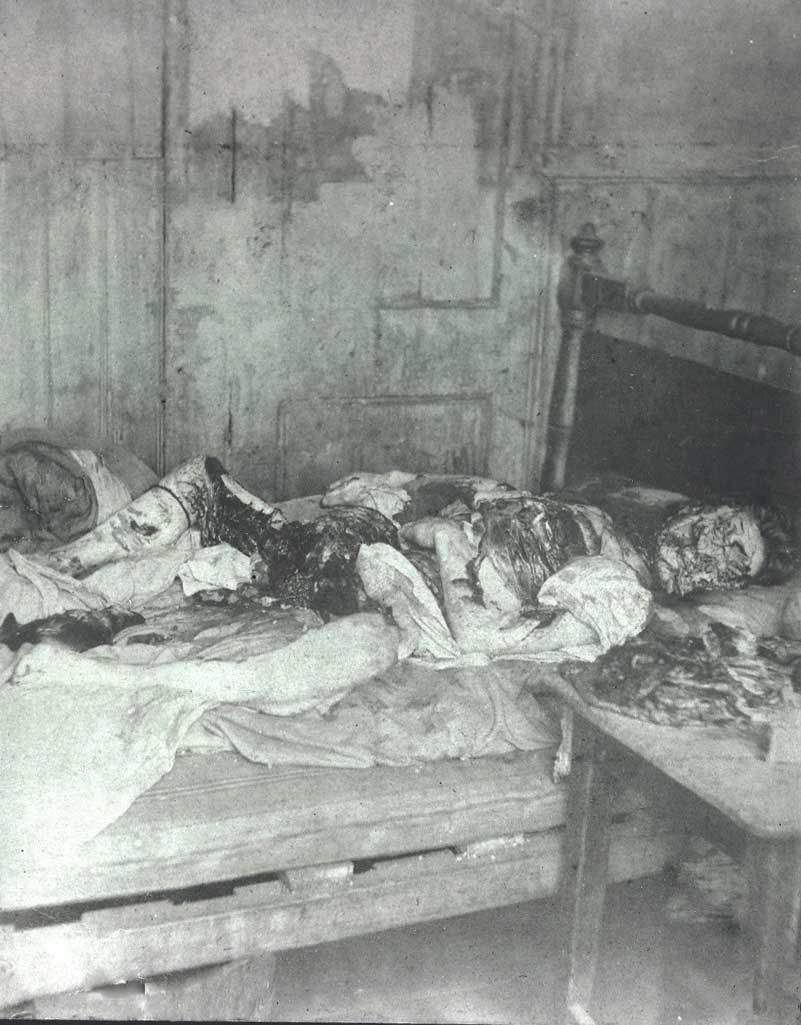
Police photograph of the body of Mary Jane Kelly as discovered in 13 Miller's Court, Spitalfields, 9 November 1888

Each of the canonical five murders was perpetrated at night, on or close to a weekend, either at the end of a month or a week (or so) after. The mutilations became increasingly severe as the series of murders proceeded, except for that of Stride, whose attacker may have been interrupted. Nichols was not missing any organs; Chapman's uterus and sections of her bladder and vagina were taken; Eddowes had her uterus and left kidney removed and her face mutilated; and Kelly's body was extensively eviscerated, with her face "gashed in all directions" and the tissue of her neck being severed to the bone, although the heart was the sole body organ missing from this crime scene.

Historically, the belief that these five canonical murders were committed by the same perpetrator is derived from contemporaneous documents which link them together to the exclusion of others. In 1894, Sir Melville Macnaghten, Assistant Chief Constable of the Metropolitan Police Service and Head of the Criminal Investigation Department (CID), wrote a report that stated: "the Whitechapel murderer had 5 victims – & 5 victims only". Similarly, the canonical five victims were linked together in a letter written by police surgeon Thomas Bond to Robert Anderson, head of the London CID, on 10 November 1888.

Some researchers have posited that some of the murders were undoubtedly the work of a single killer, but an unknown larger number of killers acting independently were responsible for the other crimes. Authors Stewart P. Evans and Donald Rumbelow argue that the canonical five is a "Ripper myth" and that three cases (Nichols, Chapman, and Eddowes) can be definitely linked to the same perpetrator, but that less certainty exists as to whether Stride and Kelly were also murdered by the same person. Conversely, others suppose that the six murders between Tabram and Kelly were the work of a single killer. Percy Clark, assistant to the examining pathologist George Bagster Phillips, linked only three of the murders and thought that the others were perpetrated by "weak-minded individual[s] ... induced to emulate the crime". Macnaghten did not join the police force until the year after the murders, and his memorandum contains serious factual errors about possible suspects.

=== Later Whitechapel murders ===
Mary Jane Kelly is generally considered to be the Ripper's final victim, and it is assumed that the crimes ended because of the culprit's death, imprisonment, institutionalisation, or emigration. The Whitechapel murders file details another four murders that occurred after the canonical five: those of Rose Mylett, Alice McKenzie, the Pinchin Street torso, and Frances Coles.

The strangled body of 26-year-old Rose Mylett was found in Clarke's Yard, High Street, Poplar on 20 December 1888. There was no sign of a struggle, and the police believed that she had either accidentally hanged herself with her collar while in a drunken stupor or committed suicide. However, faint markings left by a cord on one side of her neck suggested Mylett had been strangled. At the inquest into Mylett's death, the jury returned a verdict of murder.

Alice McKenzie was murdered shortly after midnight on 17 July 1889 in Castle Alley, Whitechapel. She had suffered two stab wounds to her neck, and her left carotid artery had been severed. Several minor bruises and cuts were found on her body, which also bore a seven-inch long superficial wound extending from her left breast to her navel. One of the examining pathologists, Thomas Bond, believed this to be a Ripper murder, though his colleague George Bagster Phillips, who had examined the bodies of three previous victims, disagreed. Opinions among writers are also divided between those who suspect McKenzie's murderer copied the modus operandi of Jack the Ripper to deflect suspicion from himself, and those who ascribe this murder to Jack the Ripper.

"The Pinchin Street torso" was a decomposing headless and legless torso of an unidentified woman aged between 30 and 40 discovered beneath a railway arch in Pinchin Street, Whitechapel, on 10 September 1889. Bruising about the victim's back, hip, and arm indicated the decedent had been extensively beaten shortly before her death. The victim's abdomen was also extensively mutilated, although her genitals had not been wounded. She appeared to have been killed approximately one day prior to the discovery of her torso. The dismembered sections of the body are believed to have been transported to the railway arch, hidden under an old chemise.

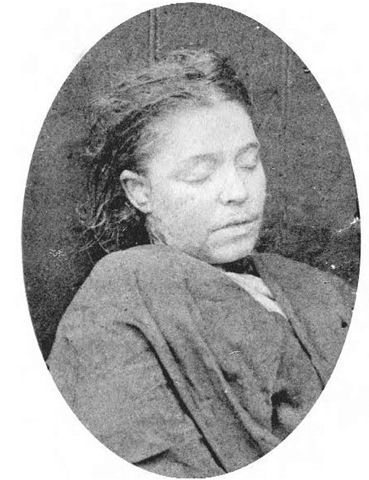
Frances Coles was found with her throat cut under a railway arch in Whitechapel on 13 February 1891.

At 2:15 am on 13 February 1891, PC Ernest Thompson discovered a 31-year-old prostitute named Frances Coles lying beneath a railway arch at Swallow Gardens, Whitechapel. Her throat had been deeply cut but her body was not mutilated, leading some to believe Thompson had disturbed her assailant. Coles was still alive, although she died before medical help could arrive. A 53-year-old stoker, James Thomas Sadler, had earlier been seen drinking with Coles, and the two are known to have argued approximately three hours before her death. Sadler – a known client of Coles – was arrested by the police and charged with her murder. He was briefly thought to be the Ripper, but was later discharged from court for lack of evidence on 3 March 1891.

=== Other alleged victims ===
In addition to the eleven Whitechapel murders, commentators have linked other attacks to the Ripper. In the case of "Fairy Fay", it is unclear whether this attack was real or fabricated as a part of Ripper lore. "Fairy Fay" was a nickname given to an unidentified woman whose body was allegedly found in a doorway close to Commercial Road on 26 December 1887, "after a stake had been thrust through her abdomen", but there were no recorded murders in Whitechapel at or around Christmas 1887. "Fairy Fay" seems to have been created through a confused press report of the murder of Emma Elizabeth Smith, who had a stick or other blunt object shoved into her vagina. Most authors agree that the victim "Fairy Fay" never existed.

A 38-year-old widow named Annie Millwood was admitted to the Whitechapel Workhouse Infirmary with numerous stab wounds to her legs and lower torso on 25 February 1888, informing staff she had been attacked with a clasp knife by an unknown man. She was later discharged, but died from apparently natural causes on 31 March. Millwood was later postulated to be the Ripper's first victim, although this attack cannot be definitively linked to the perpetrator.

Another suspected precanonical victim was a young dressmaker named Ada Wilson, who reportedly survived being stabbed twice in the neck with a clasp knife upon the doorstep of her home in Bow on 28 March 1888 by a man who had demanded money from her. A further possible victim, 40-year-old Annie Farmer, resided at the same lodging house as Martha Tabram and reported an attack on 21 November 1888. She had received a superficial cut to her throat. Although an unknown man with blood on his mouth and hands had run out of this lodging house, shouting, "Look at what she has done!" before two eyewitnesses heard Farmer scream, her wound was light, and possibly self-inflicted.

"The Whitehall Mystery" was a term coined for the discovery of a headless torso of a woman on 2 October 1888 in the basement of the new Metropolitan Police headquarters being built in Whitehall. An arm and shoulder belonging to the body were previously discovered floating in the River Thames near Pimlico on 11 September, and the left leg was subsequently discovered buried near where the torso was found on 17 October. The other limbs and head were never recovered and the body was never identified. The mutilations were similar to those in the Pinchin Street torso case, where the legs and head were severed but not the arms.

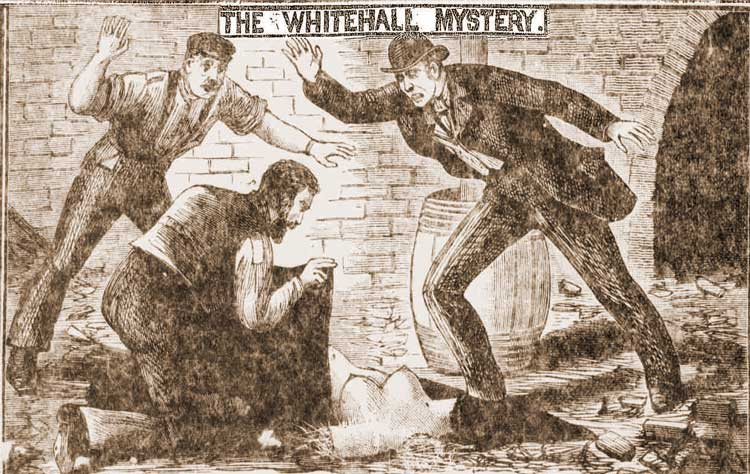
"The Whitehall Mystery" of October 1888

Both the Whitehall Mystery and the Pinchin Street case may have been part of a series of murders known as the "Thames Mysteries", committed by a single serial killer dubbed the "Torso killer". It is debatable whether Jack the Ripper and the "Torso killer" were the same person or separate serial killers active in the same area. The modus operandi of the Torso killer differed from that of the Ripper, and police at the time discounted any connection between the two. Only one of the four victims linked to the Torso killer, Elizabeth Jackson, was ever identified. Jackson was a 24-year-old prostitute from Chelsea whose various body parts were collected from the River Thames over a three-week period between 31 May and 25 June 1889.

On 29 December 1888, the body of a seven-year-old boy named John Gill was discovered in a stable block in Manningham, Bradford. Gill had been missing since the morning of 27 December. His legs had been severed, his abdomen opened, his intestines partly drawn out, and his heart and one ear were missing. Similarities with the Ripper murders led to press speculation that the Ripper had killed him. The boy's employer, 23-year-old milkman William Barrett, was twice arrested for the murder but was released due to insufficient evidence. No-one was ever prosecuted.

Carrie Brown (nicknamed "Shakespeare", reportedly for her habit of quoting Shakespeare's sonnets) was strangled with clothing and then mutilated with a knife on 24 April 1891 in New York City. Her body was found with a large tear through her groin area and superficial cuts on her legs and back. No organs were removed from the scene, though an ovary was found on the bed, either purposely removed or unintentionally dislodged. At the time, the murder was compared to those in Whitechapel, though the Metropolitan Police eventually ruled out any connection.

== Investigation ==
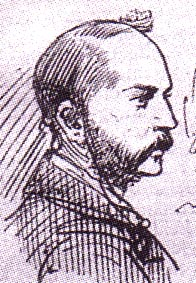
Inspector Frederick Abberline

The vast majority of the City of London Police files relating to their investigation into the Whitechapel murders were destroyed in the Blitz. The surviving Metropolitan Police files allow a detailed view of investigative procedures in the Victorian era. A large team of policemen conducted house-to-house inquiries throughout Whitechapel. Forensic material was collected and examined. Suspects were identified, traced, and either examined more closely or eliminated from the inquiry. Modern police work follows the same pattern. More than 2,000 people were interviewed, "upwards of 300" people were investigated, and 80 people were detained. Following the murders of Stride and Eddowes, the Commissioner of the City Police, Sir James Fraser, offered a reward of £500 for the arrest of the Ripper.

The investigation was initially conducted by the Metropolitan Police Whitechapel (H) Division Criminal Investigation Department (CID) headed by Detective Inspector Edmund Reid. After the murder of Nichols, Detective Inspectors Frederick Abberline, Henry Moore, and Walter Andrews were sent from Central Office at Scotland Yard to assist. The City Police were involved under Detective Inspector James McWilliam after the Eddowes murder, which occurred within the City of London. The overall direction of the murder enquiries was hampered by the fact that the newly appointed head of the CID, Assistant Commissioner Robert Anderson, was on leave in Switzerland between 7 September and 6 October, during the time when Chapman, Stride, and Eddowes were killed. This prompted Colonel Sir Charles Warren, the Commissioner of the Metropolitan Police, to appoint Chief Inspector Donald Swanson to coordinate the enquiry from Scotland Yard.

Butchers, slaughterers, surgeons, and physicians were suspected because of the manner of the mutilations. A surviving note from Major Henry Smith, Acting Commissioner of the City Police, indicates that the alibis of local butchers and slaughterers were investigated, with the result that they were eliminated from the inquiry. A report from Inspector Swanson to the Home Office confirms that 76 butchers and slaughterers were visited, and that the inquiry encompassed all their employees for the previous six months. Some contemporaneous figures, including Queen Victoria, thought the pattern of the murders indicated that the culprit was a butcher or cattle drover on one of the cattle boats that plied between London and mainland Europe. Whitechapel was close to the London Docks, and usually such boats docked on Thursday or Friday and departed on Saturday or Sunday. The cattle boats were examined but the dates of the murders did not coincide with a single boat's movements and the transfer of a crewman between boats was also ruled out.

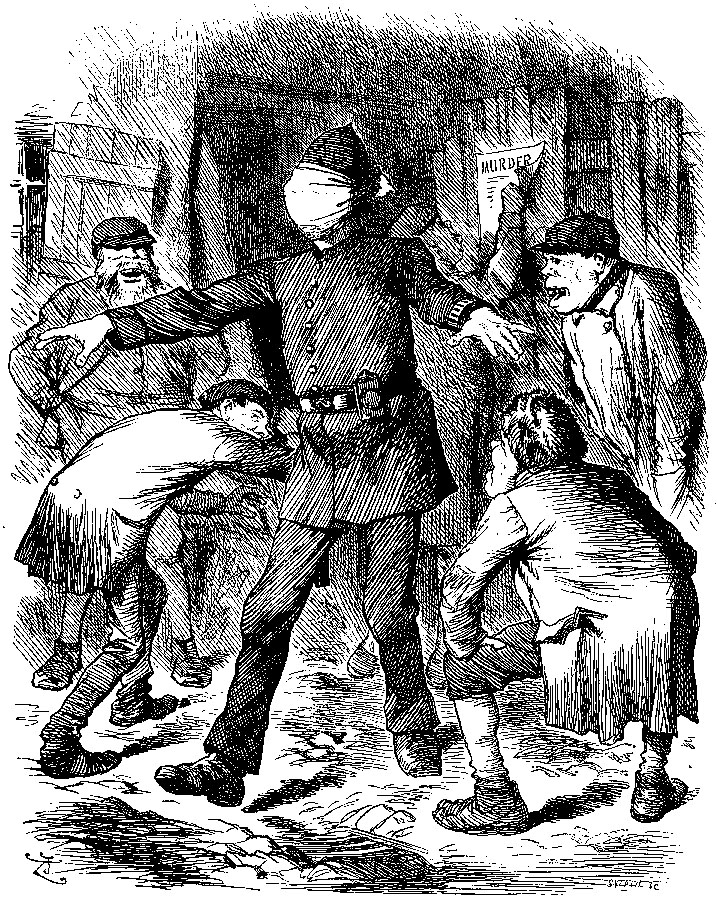
"Blind man's buff": Punch cartoon by John Tenniel (22 September 1888) criticising the police's alleged incompetence. The failure of the police to capture the killer reinforced the attitude held by radicals that the police were inept and mismanaged.

=== Whitechapel Vigilance Committee ===
In September 1888, a group of volunteer citizens in London's East End formed the Whitechapel Vigilance Committee. They patrolled the streets looking for suspicious characters, partly because of dissatisfaction with the failure of police to apprehend the perpetrator, and also because some members were concerned that the murders were affecting businesses in the area. The Committee petitioned the government to raise a reward for information leading to the arrest of the killer, offered their own reward of £50 – the equivalent of between £5,900 (inflation adjusted) and £86,000 (as a percent of GDP) in 2021 – for information leading to his capture, and hired private detectives to question witnesses independently.

=== Criminal profiling ===
At the end of October, Robert Anderson asked police surgeon Thomas Bond to give his opinion on the extent of the murderer's surgical skill and knowledge. The opinion offered by Bond on the character of the "Whitechapel murderer" is the earliest surviving offender profile. Bond's assessment was based on his own examination of the most extensively mutilated victim and the post mortem notes from the four previous canonical murders. He wrote:

All five murders no doubt were committed by the same hand. In the first four the throats appear to have been cut from left to right, in the last case owing to the extensive mutilation it is impossible to say in what direction the fatal cut was made, but arterial blood was found on the wall in splashes close to where the woman's head must have been lying.

All the circumstances surrounding the murders lead me to form the opinion that the women must have been lying down when murdered and in every case the throat was first cut.

Bond was strongly opposed to the idea that the murderer possessed any kind of scientific or anatomical knowledge, or even "the technical knowledge of a butcher or horse slaughterer". In his opinion, the killer must have been a man of solitary habits, subject to "periodical attacks of homicidal and erotic mania", with the character of the mutilations possibly indicating "satyriasis". Bond also stated that "the homicidal impulse may have developed from a revengeful or brooding condition of the mind, or that religious mania may have been the original disease but I do not think either hypothesis is likely".

There is no evidence the perpetrator engaged in sexual activity with any of the victims, yet psychologists have suggested that the penetration of the victims with a knife and "leaving them on display in sexually degrading positions with the wounds exposed" indicates that the perpetrator derived sexual pleasure from the attacks. This view is challenged by others, who dismiss such hypotheses as insupportable supposition.

== Suspects ==
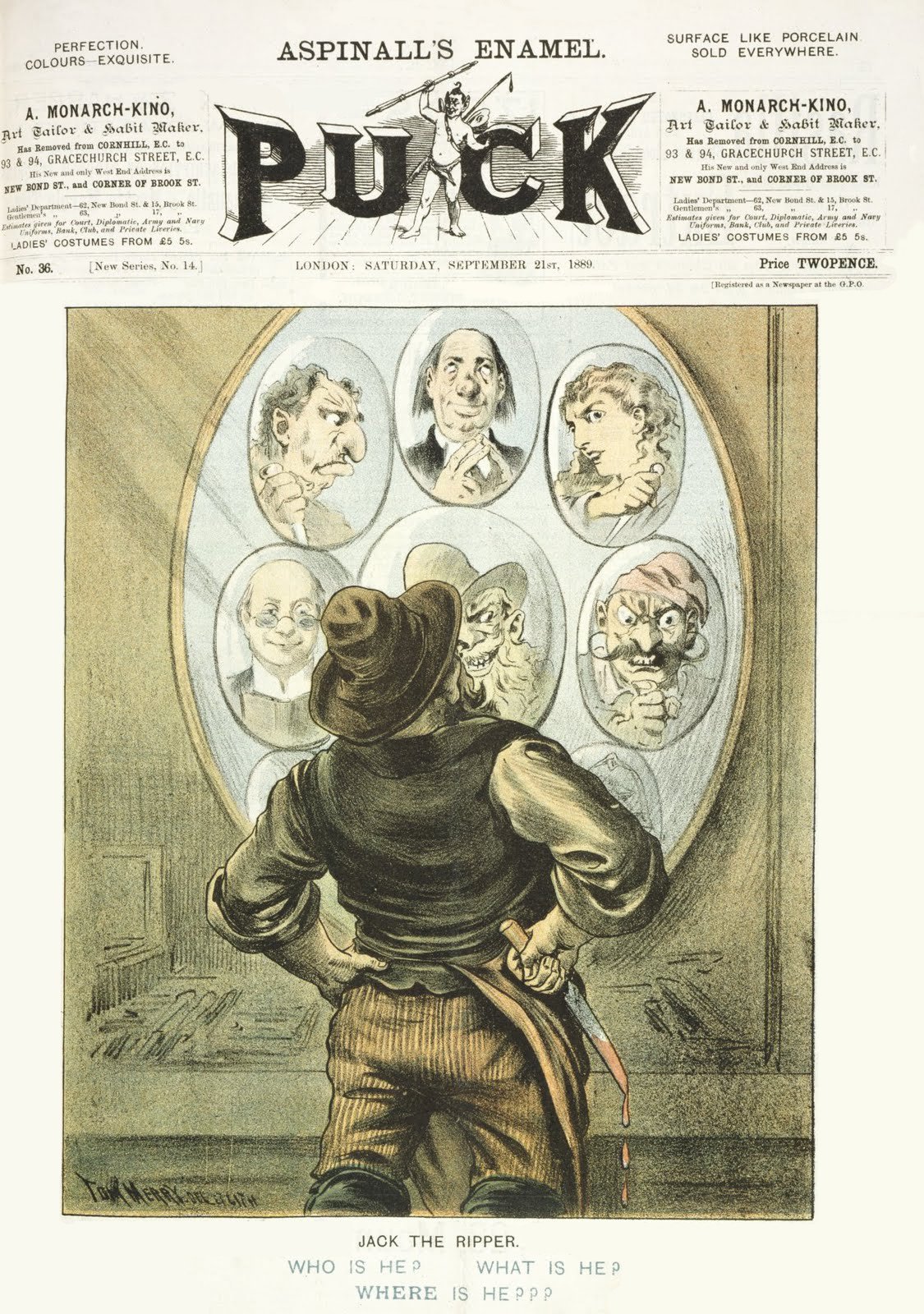
Speculation as to the identity of Jack the Ripper: cover of the 21 September 1889 issue of Puck magazine, by cartoonist Tom Merry

The concentration of the killings around weekends and public holidays and within a short distance of each other has indicated to many that the Ripper was in regular employment and lived locally. Others have opined that the killer was an educated upper-class man, possibly a doctor or an aristocrat who ventured into Whitechapel from a more well-to-do area. Such theories draw on cultural perceptions such as fear of the medical profession, a mistrust of modern science, or the exploitation of the poor by the rich. The term "ripperology" was coined in the 1970s to describe the study and analysis of the Ripper case in an effort to determine his identity, and the murders have inspired numerous works of fiction.

Suspects proposed years after the murders include almost anyone remotely connected to the case by contemporaneous documents, as well as many famous individuals who were never considered in the police investigation, including artist Walter Sickert and author Lewis Carroll. Everyone alive at the time is now long dead, and modern authors are free to accuse anyone "without any need for any supporting historical evidence". Suspects named in contemporaneous police documents include three in Sir Melville Macnaghten's 1894 memorandum, but the evidence against each of them is at best circumstantial.

In addition to the contradictions and unreliability of contemporaneous accounts, attempts to identify the murderer are hampered by the lack of any confirmed surviving forensic evidence. DNA analysis has attempted to tie Aaron Kosminski (a Whitechapel barber) to crime scene evidence and Walter Sickert to letters (possibly hoaxes) claiming to be from the Ripper. The scientific methodology used to advance these mutually incompatible claims has been criticised. The mitochondrial DNA recovered from the uncorroborated crime scene evidence compared with undisclosed descendants of Kosminski (who had no children) is considered questionable. DNA tests on extant letters have been inconclusive; the available material has been handled many times and is too contaminated to provide meaningful results. The study linking Kosminski could not be replicated and the original data could not be located, leading the Journal of Forensic Sciences to later publish an official expression of concern.

There are numerous and varied theories about the actual identity and profession of Jack the Ripper; however, authorities are not agreed upon any of them, and the number of named suspects reaches over one hundred. Despite continued interest in the case, the Ripper's identity remains unknown.

== Letters ==
Over the course of the Whitechapel murders, the police, newspapers, and other members of the public received hundreds of letters regarding the case. Some letters were well-intentioned offers of advice as to how to catch the killer, but the vast majority were either hoaxes or generally useless. Hundreds of letters claimed to have been written by the killer himself, and three of these in particular are prominent: the "Dear Boss" letter, the "Saucy Jacky" postcard, and the "From Hell" letter.

The "Dear Boss" letter, dated 25 September and postmarked 27 September 1888, was received that day by the Central News Agency, and was forwarded to Scotland Yard on 29 September. Initially, it was considered a hoax, but when Eddowes was found three days after the letter's postmark with a section of one ear obliquely cut from her body, the promise of the author to "clip the ladys [sic] ears off" gained attention. Eddowes's ear appears to have been nicked by the killer incidentally during his attack, and the letter writer's threat to send the ears to the police was never carried out. The name "Jack the Ripper" was first used in this letter by the signatory and gained worldwide notoriety after its publication. Most of the letters that followed copied this letter's tone, with some authors adopting pseudonyms such as "George of the High Rip Gang" and "Jack Sheridan, the Ripper". Some sources claim that another letter dated 17 September 1888 was the first to use the name "Jack the Ripper", but most experts believe that this was a fake inserted into police records in the 20th century.

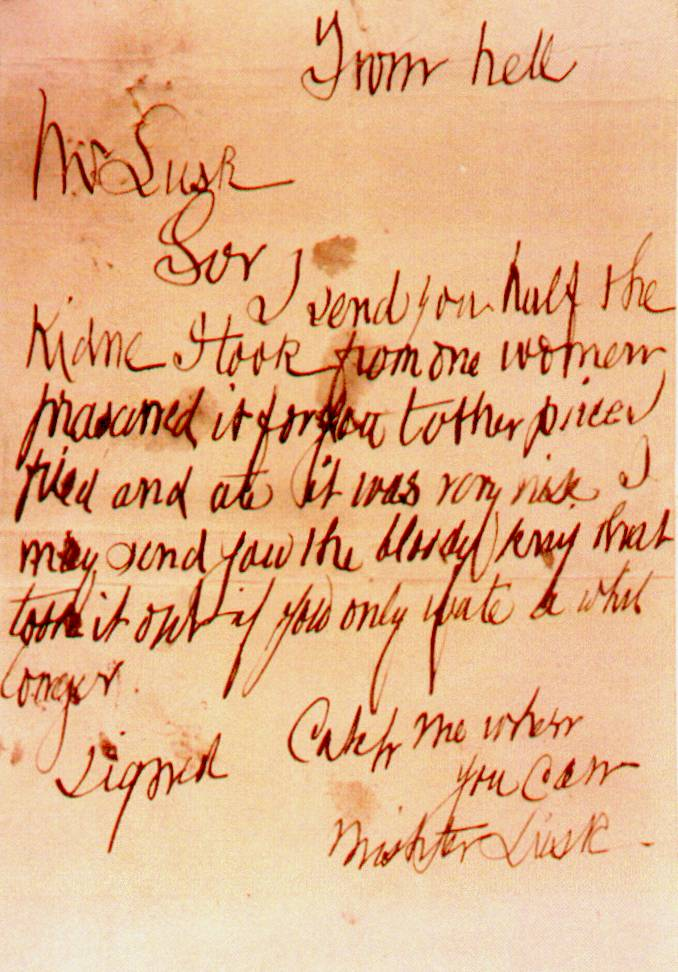
The "From Hell" letter

The "Saucy Jacky" postcard was postmarked 1 October 1888 and was received the same day by the Central News Agency. The handwriting was similar to that of the "Dear Boss" letter, and mentioned the canonical murders committed on 30 September, which the author refers to by writing "double event this time". It has been argued that the postcard was posted before the murders were widely publicised, making it unlikely that a crank would hold such knowledge of the crimes; however, it was postmarked more than 24 hours after the killings occurred, by which time details of the murders had been reported in the press and had become general community gossip among Whitechapel residents.

The "From Hell" letter was received by George Lusk, leader of the Whitechapel Vigilance Committee, on 16 October 1888. Its handwriting and style is markedly different from that of the "Dear Boss" letter and "Saucy Jacky" postcard. The letter came with a small box in which Lusk discovered half of a human kidney, preserved in "spirits of wine" (ethanol). Eddowes's left kidney had been removed by the killer. The writer claimed that he "fried and ate" the missing kidney half. There is disagreement over the kidney; some contend that it belonged to Eddowes, while others argue that it was a macabre practical joke. The kidney was examined by Thomas Openshaw of the London Hospital, who determined that it was human and from the left side, but (contrary to false newspaper reports) he could not determine any other biological characteristics. Openshaw subsequently also received a letter signed "Jack the Ripper".

Scotland Yard published facsimiles of the "Dear Boss" letter and the postcard on 3 October, in the ultimately vain hope that a member of the public would recognise the handwriting. Charles Warren explained in a letter to Godfrey Lushington, Permanent Under-Secretary of State for the Home Department: "I think the whole thing a hoax but of course we are bound to try & ascertain the writer in any case." On 7 October 1888, George R. Sims in the Sunday newspaper Referee implied scathingly that the letter was written by a journalist "to hurl the circulation of a newspaper sky high". Police officials later claimed to have identified a specific journalist as the author of both the "Dear Boss" letter and the postcard. The journalist was identified as Tom Bullen in a letter from Chief Inspector John Littlechild to George R. Sims dated 23 September 1913. (Note: The full name of this journalist is believed to be Thomas John Bulling.) A journalist named Fred Best reportedly confessed in 1931 that he and a colleague at The Star had written the letters signed "Jack the Ripper" to heighten interest in the murders and "keep the business alive".

== Media ==
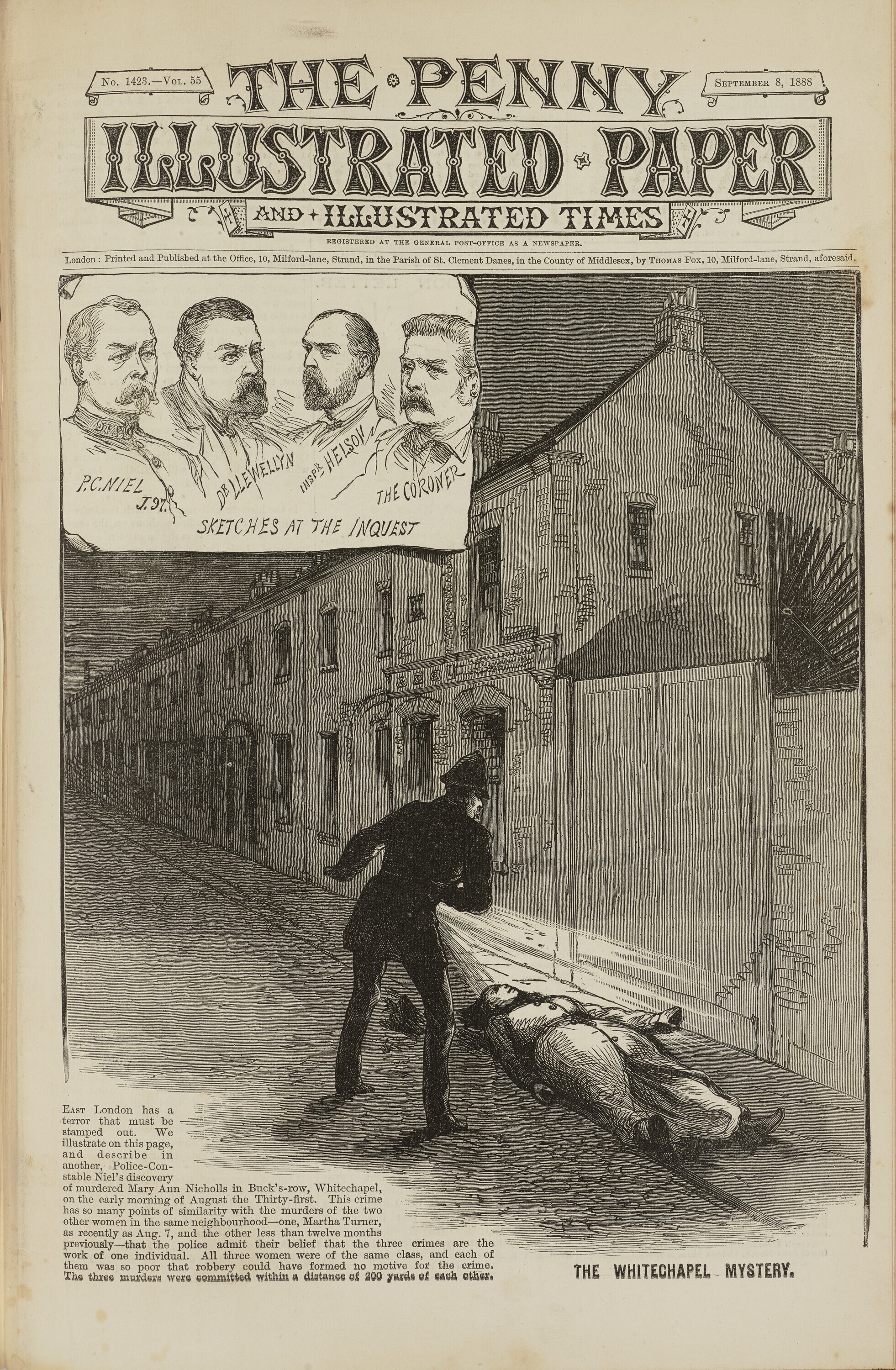
8 September 1888 edition of the Penny Illustrated Paper depicting the discovery of the body of the first canonical Ripper victim, Mary Ann Nichols

The Ripper murders mark an important watershed in the treatment of crime by journalists. Jack the Ripper was not the first serial killer, but his case was the first to create a worldwide media frenzy. The Elementary Education Act 1880 (which had extended upon a previous Act) made school attendance compulsory regardless of class. In consequence, by 1888, more working-class people in England and Wales were literate.

Tax reforms in the 1850s had enabled the publication of inexpensive newspapers with a wider circulation. These mushroomed in the later Victorian era to include mass-circulation newspapers costing as little as a halfpenny, along with popular magazines such as The Illustrated Police News which made the Ripper the beneficiary of previously unparalleled publicity. Consequently, at the height of the investigation, over one million copies of newspapers with extensive coverage devoted to the Whitechapel murders were sold each day. However, many of the articles were sensationalistic and speculative, and false information was regularly printed as fact. In addition, several articles speculating as to the identity of the Ripper alluded to local xenophobic rumours that the perpetrator was either Jewish or foreign.

In early September, six days after the murder of Mary Ann Nichols, The Manchester Guardian reported: "Whatever information may be in the possession of the police they deem it necessary to keep secret ... It is believed their attention is particularly directed to ... a notorious character known as 'Leather Apron'." Journalists were frustrated by the unwillingness of the CID to reveal details of their investigation to the public, and so resorted to writing reports of questionable veracity. Imaginative descriptions of "Leather Apron" appeared in the press, but rival journalists dismissed these as "a mythical outgrowth of the reporter's fancy". John Pizer, a local Jew who made footwear from leather, was known by the name "Leather Apron" and was arrested, even though the investigating inspector reported that "at present there is no evidence whatsoever against him". He was soon released after the confirmation of his alibis.

After the publication of the "Dear Boss" letter, "Jack the Ripper" supplanted "Leather Apron" as the name adopted by the press and public to describe the killer. The name "Jack" was already used to describe another fabled London attacker: "Spring-heeled Jack", who supposedly leapt over walls to strike at his victims and escape as quickly as he came. The invention and adoption of a nickname for a particular killer became standard media practice with examples such as the Axeman of New Orleans, the Boston Strangler, and the Beltway Sniper. Examples derived from Jack the Ripper include the French Ripper, the Düsseldorf Ripper, the Camden Ripper, the Blackout Ripper, Jack the Stripper, the Yorkshire Ripper, and the Rostov Ripper. Sensational press reports combined with the fact that no one was ever convicted of the murders have confused scholarly analysis and created a legend that casts a shadow over later serial killers.

== Legacy ==
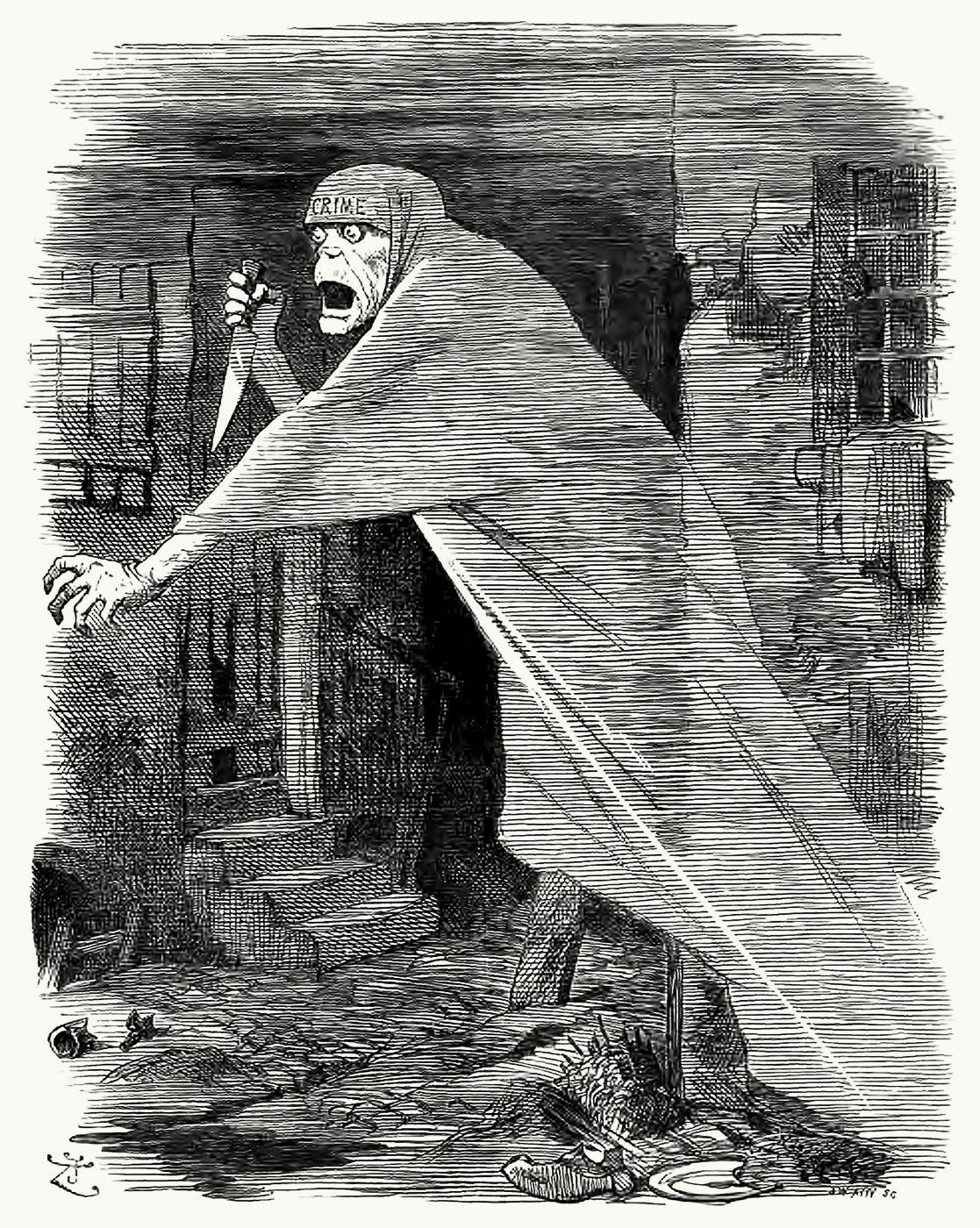
The "Nemesis of Neglect": Jack the Ripper depicted as a phantom stalking Whitechapel, and as an embodiment of social neglect, in an 1888 Punch cartoon

The nature of the Ripper murders, as well as the impoverished lifestyle of the victims, drew attention to the poor living conditions in the East End, and galvanised public opinion against the overcrowded, insanitary slums. In the two decades after the murders, the worst of the slums were cleared and demolished; the streets and some buildings survive, and the legend of the Ripper is still promoted by various guided tours of the murder sites and other locations pertaining to the case. For many years, the Ten Bells public house in Commercial Street (which had been frequented by at least one of the canonical Ripper victims) was the focus of such tours.

In the immediate aftermath of the murders and later, "Jack the Ripper became the children's bogey man." Depictions were often phantasmic or monstrous. In the 1920s and 1930s, he was depicted in film dressed in everyday clothes as a man with a hidden secret, preying on his unsuspecting victims; atmosphere and evil were suggested through lighting effects and shadowplay. By the 1960s, the Ripper had become "the symbol of a predatory aristocracy", and was more often portrayed in a top hat dressed as a gentleman. The Establishment as a whole became the villain, with the Ripper acting as a manifestation of upper-class exploitation. The image of the Ripper merged with or borrowed symbols from horror stories, such as Dracula's cloak or Victor Frankenstein's organ harvest. The fictional world of the Ripper can fuse with multiple genres, ranging from Sherlock Holmes to Japanese erotic horror such as Assault! Jack the Ripper.

Jack the Ripper features in hundreds of works of fiction and works which straddle the boundaries between fact and fiction, including the Ripper letters and a hoax diary: The Diary of Jack the Ripper. The Ripper appears in novels, short stories, poems, comic books, games, songs, plays, operas, television programmes, and films. More than 100 non-fiction works deal exclusively with the Jack the Ripper murders, making this case one of the most written-about in the true-crime genre. The term "ripperology" was coined by philosopher-novelist Colin Wilson in the 1970s to describe the study of the case by both professionals and amateurs. The periodicals Ripperana, Ripperologist, and Ripper Notes publish their research. Authors noted for their non-fiction Jack the Ripper related work include Donald Rumbelow, Paul Begg, Martin Fido and Hallie Rubenhold.

In 2006, a BBC History magazine poll selected Jack the Ripper as the worst Briton in history. In 2015, the Jack the Ripper Museum opened in east London. It attracted criticism from both Tower Hamlets mayor John Biggs and protesters. Similar protests occurred in 2021 when the second of two "Jack The Chipper" fish and chip shops opened in Greenwich, with some locals threatening to boycott the shop.

== See also ==
- List of fugitives from justice who disappeared
- List of murderers by number of victims
- List of serial killers before 1900
- List of serial killers in the United Kingdom
