= John Littlechild =

British police officer (1848–1923)

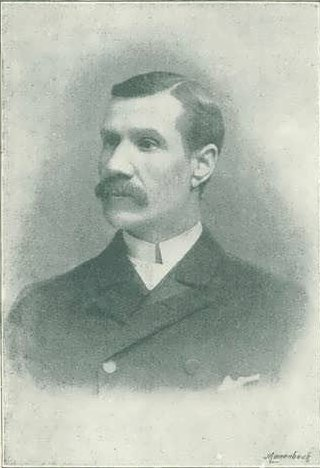
- Detective Chief Inspector John Littlechild in 1893
- Born: John George Littlechild; 21 December 1848; Royston, Hertfordshire, England
- Died: 2 January 1923 (aged 74); London, England
- Known for: First commander of the London Metropolitan Police Special Irish Branch

Detective Chief Inspector John George Littlechild (21 December 1848 – 2 January 1923) was the first commander of the London Metropolitan Police Special Irish Branch, renamed Special Branch in 1888.

Littlechild was born in Royston, Hertfordshire. By 1871, he was a Detective Sergeant. He was promoted to Detective Inspector in 1878.

The Special Irish Branch was formed in 1883. It was technically under the command of Detective Chief Inspector Adolphus Williamson, but since he was also responsible for the whole Criminal Investigation Department (CID), Littlechild, as his deputy, was always in effective control. Although he is not thought to have had any direct involvement in the Jack the Ripper investigation, in September 1913 he wrote a letter to journalist G. R. Sims, in which he identified a "Doctor T" (whom he described as "an American quack named Tumblety") as a likely suspect.

Littlechild was promoted to Detective Chief Inspector in 1891. He resigned from the Met in 1893 and worked as a private investigator. He worked for the prosecution in the Oscar Wilde case. In November 1902 he served divorce papers on Arthur Reginald Baker, who days later was murdered by his lover Kitty Byron.

Police appointments
| Preceded by First incumbent | Head of Special Branch, Metropolitan Police; 1883–1893 | Succeeded by William Melville |

== Notes ==
- Various contemporary articles in The Times
