= Thames Torso Murders =

1873–1889 unsolved murders in London, England

The Thames Torso Murders, often called the Thames Mysteries or the Embankment Murders, were a sequence of unsolved murders of women occurring in London, England from 1887 to 1889. The series included four incidents which were filed as belonging to the same series. None of the cases were solved, and only one of the four victims was identified. In addition, other murders of a similar kind, taking place between 1873 and 1902, have also been associated with the same murder series.

Speculations have linked the Thames murder series to that of the contemporary Whitechapel murders and Jack the Ripper. However, the modus operandi of the perpetrator of the Thames Torso Murders differs from the other unidentified criminal, in that the victims of Jack the Ripper suffered progressive abdominal- and genital-area mutilation, whereas the Thames Torso Murderer dismembered the bodies of his victims.

== The canonical four ==
The series included four incidents which were filed as belonging to the same series. These cases were the Rainham Mystery, the Whitehall Mystery, the murder of Elizabeth Jackson, and the Pinchin Street Torso Murder.

=== Rainham Mystery ===
Between May and June 1887, the remains of a woman's body were found in the River Thames near Rainham. On 11 May 1887 at about 11:30 a lighterman named Edward Hughes fished a sack containing a human torso from the Thames at Rainham. At the inquest into the murder, general practitioner and surgeon Edward Callaway believed that woman had been around 27 to 29 years of age and noted her body was in a "very well nourished condition". Callaway was certain that a "very skilful person had cut up the body" and was "thoroughly acquainted" with anatomy. He would later state that the body had been dismembered very soon after death, but he could not find any indication of how the woman had died.

On 5 June 1887, pierman John Morris found a floating right thigh with patella close to Temple Pier in central London. On the same day a lower thorax and upper abdomen were found as one piece on the south bank of the Thames near Battersea pier. Doctor Calloway confirmed these body parts fitted with the Torso found at Rainham. In the following three weeks further body parts were found at St Pancras Lock and Regent's Canal. Two arms and two lower legs with feet were found at the latter location. The head and upper chest were never found.

Doctor Callaway believed that the woman had died at the end of April or beginning of May.

The investigation concluded that the body had not been dissected for medical purposes but that a degree of medical knowledge had been necessary to perform the dissection. Because the doctors could not state a cause of death, the jury was forced to return a verdict of "Found Dead".

=== Whitehall Mystery ===
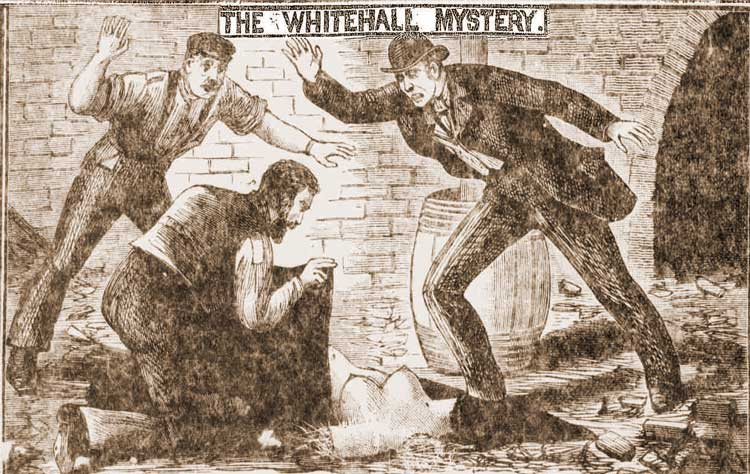
Contemporary newspaper illustration of the Whitehall Mystery

Between 11 September and 17 October 1888, the dismembered remains of a woman were discovered at three different sites in the centre of the city, including the future site of Scotland Yard, the police's headquarters. The torso was matched by police surgeon Thomas Bond to a right arm and shoulder that had previously been discovered on the muddy shore of the River Thames in Pimlico on 11 September. The Times newspaper had initially suspected that the arm was placed in the water as a medical students' prank. On 17 October 1888, reporter Jasper Waring used a Spitsbergen dog, with the permission of the police and the help of a labourer, to find a left leg cut above the knee that was buried near the construction site.

=== Elizabeth Jackson ===
On 4 June 1889, a female torso was found in the Thames, and more body parts were soon found in the Thames the next week.

The Times reported on 11 June that the remains found so far "are as follows: Tuesday, left leg and thigh off Battersea, lower part of the abdomen at Horsleydown; Thursday, the liver near Nine Elms, upper part of the body in Battersea Park, neck and shoulders off Battersea; Friday, right foot and part of leg at Wandsworth, left leg and foot at Limehouse; Saturday, left arm and hand at Bankside, buttocks and pelvis off Battersea, right thigh at Chelsea Embankment, yesterday, right arm and hand at Bankside." The investigation concluded that medical knowledge had been necessary to perform the dismemberment. At the inquest held by Mr Braxton Hicks on 17 June, it was stated: "the division of the parts showed skill and design: not, however, the anatomical skill of a surgeon, but the practical knowledge of a butcher or a knacker. There was a great similarity between the condition, as regarded cutting up, of the remains and that of those found at Rainham and at the new police building on the Thames Embankment." The Times of 5 June reported that "in the opinion of the doctors the women had been dead only 48 hours, and the body had been dissected somewhat roughly by a person who must have had some knowledge of the joints of the human body."

She was about eight months pregnant. The doctors were also this time unable to establish a cause of death. The coroner's jury, however, reached the decision of "Wilful murder against some person or persons unknown".

Though the head was never found, the victim was identified as Elizabeth Jackson, a homeless prostitute from Chelsea. She was conclusively identified on 25 June 1889. Jackson's boyfriend John Faircloth was arrested in Devon on suspicion of murder, having left the city around the time of Elizabeth's disappearance. However, it was proved that Faircloth had left London a full ten days before the discovery of Jackson's remains, whereas Jackson was seen alive after that date. No other suspect was identified.

=== Pinchin Street Torso Murder ===
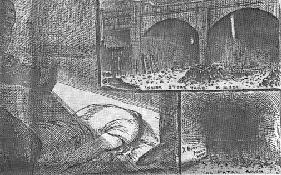
Contemporary illustration of the discovery of the Pinchin Street torso

On 10 September 1889, Police Constable William Pennett found the headless and legless torso of an unidentified woman under a railway arch at Pinchin Street, Whitechapel. It seems probable that the murder was committed elsewhere and that parts of the dismembered body were dispersed for disposal.

Extensive bruising about the victim's back, hip, and arm indicated that she had been severely assaulted shortly before her death, which had occurred approximately one day prior to the discovery of her torso. The victim's abdomen was also extensively mutilated in a manner reminiscent of the Ripper, although her genitals had not been wounded. The dismembered sections of the body are believed to have been transported to the railway arch, hidden under an old chemise. The age of the victim was estimated at 30–40 years. Despite a search of the area, no other sections of her body were ever found, and neither the victim nor the culprit were ever identified.

Chief Inspector Swanson and Commissioner Monro observed that the presence of blood within the torso indicated that death was not from haemorrhage or cutting of the throat. The pathologists, however, said that the general bloodlessness of the tissues and vessels indicated that haemorrhage was the cause of death. Newspaper speculation that the body belonged to Lydia Hart, who had disappeared, was refuted after she was found recovering in hospital after "a bit of a spree". Another claim that the victim was a missing girl called Emily Barker was also refuted, as the torso was from an older and taller woman.

Swanson did not consider this a Ripper case, and instead suggested a link to the Thames Torso Murders in Rainham and Chelsea, as well as the "Whitehall Mystery". Monro agreed with Swanson's assessment. These three murders and the Pinchin Street case are suggested to be the work of a serial killer, nicknamed the "Torso killer", who could either be the same person as "Jack the Ripper" or a separate killer of uncertain connection. Links between these and three further murders—the "Battersea Mystery" of 1873 and 1874, in which two women were found dismembered, and the 1884 "Tottenham Court Road Mystery"—have also been postulated. Experts on the murders, such as Stewart Evans, Keith Skinner, Martin Fido, Donald Rumbelow, and more recently Sarah Bax Horton discount any connection between the torso and Ripper killings on the basis of their different modi operandi.

== Associated cases ==
Outside the four canonical cases which were filed by the police as belonging to the same series, there were additional cases which have been linked to the Thames Torso Murders.

=== Battersea Mystery ===
The Battersea Mystery is the name given to two unsolved murders that took place in London in 1873–74.

On 5 September 1873, the left quarter of a woman's trunk was discovered by a Thames Police patrol near Battersea. Subsequently, a right breast was found at Nine Elms, a prised-off face and scalp at Limehouse, a left forearm at Battersea, a pelvis at Woolwich, until an almost complete body of a dismembered woman had been found. The head itself was never found.

Under the leadership of the Acting Chief Surgeon, Metropolitan Police, Thomas Bond, the corpse was reconstructed. The attempts to identify the remains were disturbed by the curiosity of the public, and the police first showed a photograph to any potential witness.

The Lancet reported:

"Contrary to the popular opinion, the body had not been hacked, but dexterously cut up; the joints have been opened, and the bones neatly disarticulated, even the complicated joints at the ankle and the elbow, and it is only at the articulations of the hip-joint and shoulder that the bones have been sawn through."

The jury passed a verdict of "Wilful murder against some person or persons unknown". The case remained unsolved, despite a £200 reward being offered for information.

In June 1874, the dismembered body of a female was discovered in the River Thames at Putney. The corpse lacked a head, both arms, and one leg, and had been treated with lime before being thrown in the river. The jury returned an open verdict. The case remained unsolved.

=== Tottenham Court Road and Bedford Square Mystery ===
The Tottenham Court Road Mystery was reported by The Times on 24 October 1884, relating to the discovery of parts of a woman's body:

- A skull, still with flesh attached to it
- A chunk of flesh from a thighbone.

Near Tottenham Court Road, in Bedford Square, a woman's arm was found in a parcel. This arm had been tattooed, showing that it might have belonged to a prostitute.

A human torso was found in a parcel by a police constable as he passed 33 Fitzroy Square five days later. The parcel was believed to have been placed at the location between the hours of 10:00 and 10:15.

Evidence was presented in an inquest on 11 November, held at St. Giles Coroner's Court. This concluded that the body parts came from a woman and that they might have been divided by someone who was skilled, but not for the purpose of anatomy.

The inquest resumed on 9 December. More evidence was presented and showed, as stated by Dr Jenkins, how the body, from a woman, was skillfully dissected. This evidence was the right arm, both feet, and the right forearm of a single individual.

These two mysteries still remain unsolved.

=== Le mystere de Montrouge and Lambeth Mystery ===
In his 2002 book The Thames Torso Murders of Victorian London, R. Michael Gordon suggests there may be a link to a murder in Paris in 1886, as well as to another murder in London in 1902.

In November 1886, a woman's torso was found on the steps of the Montrouge church in Paris, missing the head, legs, right arm, left breast and uterus.

In June 1902, a woman's torso was found in Salamanca Alley in Lambeth in London.

No suspect was identified in either case.

== Speculation ==
Newspapers suggested a tie to Jack the Ripper's killings that were occurring simultaneously, but the Metropolitan Police said there was no connection. It is debatable whether Jack the Ripper and the "Torso killer" were the same person or separate serial killers active in the same area. The modus operandi of the Torso killer differed from that of the Ripper, and police at the time discounted any connection between the two.

In January 2026, the case was reinvestigated in a three-part BBC documentary series, Lucy Worsley's Victorian Murder Club. Historian Lucy Worsley believes she, fellow historian Sarah Bax Horton and a team of researchers have solved it, proposing waterman James Crick as the killer.

== In books ==
The 2024 non-fiction work Arm of Eve: Investigating the Thames Torso Murders by Sarah Bax Horton re-examines the case and proposes Thames waterman and lighterman James Crick as the Thames Torso Killer.

In 2026 The Thames Torso Murders: Fact or Fiction? by Suzanne Huntington was published. It takes a wider examination of all the unsolved dismemberment cases in London during the later Victorian period with a view to assessing whether any of the cases have provable links.

== See also ==
- Cleveland Torso Murders
