= Remakes of films by Alfred Hitchcock =

Films that are considered remakes of Alfred Hitchcock's

A number of films directed by Alfred Hitchcock have been remade, with official remakes of Murder! and The Man Who Knew Too Much being directed by Hitchcock himself. North by Northwest and Saboteur are also considered by some scholars to be unofficial remakes of Hitchcock's English espionage thriller The 39 Steps. This list does not include sequels (such as the films that followed the 1960 version of Psycho), but it does include films based on the same original source materials as were used by Hitchcock (such as the multiple films based on Marie Belloc Lowndes's novel The Lodger).

== Table ==
Remake				Original Hitchcock film		Source material			Comments and citations
Year	Title	Director	Country	Year	Title	Year	Title	Writer(s)	Comments and citations
1931	Mary	Alfred Hitchcock	UK	1930	Murder!	1928	Enter Sir John (novel)	Clemence Dane and Helen Simpson	
1932	The Lodger	Maurice Elvey	UK	1927	The Lodger: A Story of the London Fog	1913	The Lodger (novel)	Marie Belloc Lowndes	
1944	The Lodger	John Brahm	USA	1927	The Lodger: A Story of the London Fog	1913	The Lodger (novel)	Marie Belloc Lowndes	
1953	Man in the Attic	Hugo Fregonese	USA	1927	The Lodger: A Story of the London Fog	1913	The Lodger (novel)	Marie Belloc Lowndes	
1956	The Man Who Knew Too Much	Alfred Hitchcock	USA	1934	The Man Who Knew Too Much	1934	Original screenplay	Charles Bennett; D. B. Wyndham-Lewis; Edwin Greenwood (scenario); A. R. Rawlinson (scenario)	
1958	Step Down to Terror	Harry Keller	USA	1943	Shadow of a Doubt	1943	Original screenplay	Story: Gordon McDonell; Screenplay: Thornton Wilder; Sally Benson; Alma Reville	
1958	Dial M for Murder	George Schaefer	USA	1954	Dial M for Murder	1952	Dial M for Murder (stage play)	Frederick Knott	
1959	The Fifth Stair	Vincent Sherman	USA	1954	Dial M for Murder	1952	Dial M for Murder (stage play)	Frederick Knott	
1959	The 39 Steps	Ralph Thomas	UK	1935	The 39 Steps	1915	The Thirty-Nine Steps (novel)	John Buchan	
1962	Dial M for Murder	Alan Bridges	USA	1954	Dial M for Murder	1952	Dial M for Murder (stage play)	Frederick Knott	
1967	Dial M for Murder	John Llewellyn Moxey	USA	1954	Dial M for Murder	1952	Dial M for Murder (stage play)	Frederick Knott	
1969	Once You Kiss a Stranger	Robert Sparr	USA	1951	Strangers on a Train	1950	Strangers on a Train (novel)	Patricia Highsmith	
1976	Obsession	Brian De Palma	USA	1958	Vertigo	1954	The Living and the Dead (novel)	Boileau-Narcejac	
1978	The Thirty Nine Steps	Don Sharp	UK	1935	The 39 Steps	1915	The Thirty-Nine Steps (novel)	John Buchan	
1979	The Lady Vanishes	Anthony Page	UK	1938	The Lady Vanishes	1936	The Wheel Spins (novel)	Ethel Lina White	
1980	Dressed to Kill	Brian De Palma	USA	1960	Psycho	1959	Psycho (novel)	Robert Bloch	
1981	Dial M for Murder	Boris Sagal	USA	1954	Dial M for Murder	1952	Dial M for Murder (stage play)	Frederick Knott	
1984	Body Double	Brian De Palma	USA	1954	Rear Window	1942	"It Had to Be Murder" (short story)	Cornell Woolrich	
1984	Body Double	Brian De Palma	USA	1958	Vertigo	1954	The Living and the Dead (novel)	Boileau-Narcejac	
1991	Shadow of a Doubt	Karen Arthur	USA	1943	Shadow of a Doubt	1943	Original screenplay	Story: Gordon McDonell; Screenplay: Thornton Wilder; Sally Benson; Alma Reville	
1992	Notorious	Colin Bucksey	USA	1946	Notorious	1946	Original screenplay	Ben Hecht	
1993	Lifepod	Ron Silver	USA	1944	Lifeboat	1944	Original screenplay	Story: John Steinbeck; Screenplay: Jo Swerling	
1996	Once You Meet a Stranger	Tommy Lee Wallace	USA	1951	Strangers on a Train	1950	Strangers on a Train (novel)	Patricia Highsmith	
1996	The Secret Agent	Christopher Hampton	UK	1936	Sabotage	1907	The Secret Agent (novel)	Joseph Conrad	
1998	A Perfect Murder	Andrew Davis	USA	1954	Dial M for Murder	1952	Dial M for Murder (stage play)	Frederick Knott	
1998	Rear Window	Jeff Bleckner	USA	1954	Rear Window	1942	"It Had to Be Murder" (short story)	Cornell Woolrich	
1998	Psycho	Gus Van Sant	USA	1960	Psycho	1959	Psycho (novel)	Robert Bloch	
2000	Mission: Impossible 2	John Woo	USA	1946	Notorious	1946	Original screenplay	Ben Hecht	
2007	Disturbia	D. J. Caruso	USA	1954	Rear Window	1942	"It Had to Be Murder" (short story)	Cornell Woolrich	
2001	Officer	Naeem Sha	India	1958	Vertigo	1954	The Living and the Dead (novel)	Boileau-Narcejac	
2008	Easy Virtue	Stephan Elliott	UK	1928	Easy Virtue	1925	Easy Virtue (stage play)	Noël Coward	
2008	The 39 Steps	James Hawes	UK	1935	The 39 Steps	1915	The Thirty-Nine Steps (novel)	John Buchan	
2009	The Lodger	David Ondaatje	USA	1927	The Lodger: A Story of the London Fog	1913	The Lodger (novel)	Marie Belloc Lowndes	
2013	Stoker	Park Chan-wook	USA	1943	Shadow of a Doubt	1943	Original screenplay	Story: Gordon McDonell; Screenplay: Thornton Wilder; Sally Benson; Alma Reville	
2020	Rebecca	Ben Wheatley	USA	1940	Rebecca	1938	Rebecca (novel)	Daphne du Maurier	

== Announced remakes ==
After the success of Gone Girl, in January 2015 it was announced that David Fincher would direct a remake of Strangers on a Train with Ben Affleck to star with a script penned by Gillian Flynn.

In March 2023, it was reported that Paramount Pictures acquired the remake rights to Vertigo, with Steven Knight set to write the script and Robert Downey Jr. set to star. As of March 2025, Knight is still working on the screenplay.

In February 2024, it was announced that Kevin Williamson is developing a television series based on Rear Window for Peacock and Universal Television.
