= Noir fiction =

Subgenre of crime fiction

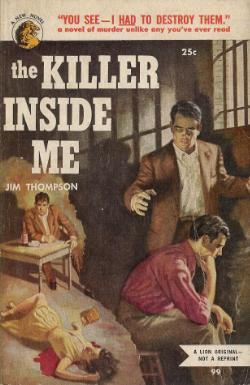
The cover of The Killer Inside Me by Jim Thompson, an example of noir fiction.

Noir fiction (or roman noir in French, literally, "black novel") is a genre of crime fiction marked by darkness in theme and subject matter, generally featuring a mixture of violence, disturbing sexual themes, and a nihilistic or pessimistic tone.

== Definition ==
While related to and frequently confused with hardboiled detective fiction—due to the regular adaptation of hardboiled detective stories in the film noir style—the two are not the same. Both regularly take place against a backdrop of systemic and institutional corruption. However, noir (French for "black") fiction is centred on protagonists that are either victims, suspects, or perpetrators—often self-destructive. A typical protagonist of noir fiction is forced to deal with a corrupt legal, political or other system, through which the protagonist is either victimized and/or has to victimize others, leading to a lose-lose situation. Otto Penzler argues that the traditional hardboiled detective story and noir story are "diametrically opposed, with mutually exclusive philosophical premises". While the classic hardboiled private detective—as exemplified by the creations of writers such as Dashiell Hammett, Raymond Chandler and Mickey Spillane—may bend or break the law, this is done by a protagonist with meaningful agency in pursuit of justice, and "although not every one of their cases may have a happy conclusion, the hero nonetheless will emerge with a clean ethical slate." Noir works, on the other hand,

whether films, novels, or short stories, are existential pessimistic tales about people, including (or especially) protagonists who are seriously flawed and morally questionable. The tone is generally bleak and nihilistic, with characters whose greed, lust, jealousy, and alienation lead them into a downward spiral as their plans and schemes inevitably go awry. ... The machinations of their relentless lust will cause them to lie, steal, cheat, and even kill as they become more and more entangled in a web from which they cannot possibly extricate themselves.

Author and academic Megan Abbott described the two thus:

Hardboiled is distinct from noir, though they're often used interchangeably. The common argument is that hardboiled novels are an extension of the wild west and pioneer narratives of the 19th century. The wilderness becomes the city, and the hero is usually a somewhat fallen character, a detective or a cop. At the end, everything is a mess, people have died, but the hero has done the right thing or close to it, and order has, to a certain extent, been restored.

Noir is different. In noir, everyone is fallen, and right and wrong are not clearly defined and maybe not even attainable.

Andrew Pepper, in an essay published in The Cambridge Companion to American Crime Fiction, listed the major thematic commonalities of noir fiction as "the corrosive effects of money, the meaninglessness and absurdity of existence, anxieties about masculinity and the bureaucratization of public life, a fascination with the grotesque and a flirtation with, and rejection of, Freudian psychoanalysis." Eddie Duggan discusses the distinction between hardboiled and noir fiction, claiming that "psychological instability is the key characteristic of the protagonists of noir writing, if not the key characteristic of the noir writers themselves". Similarly, Johnny Temple, founder of Akashic Books, observed that noir fiction tends to be written by "authors whose life circumstances often place them in environments vulnerable to crime."

== Origins and later proponents ==
Beginning with 1940's The Bride Wore Black, author Cornell Woolrich wrote a series of six unrelated noir novels with "black" in the title, three of which were adapted for film in the 1940s. The word "noir" was used by the Paris-based publisher Gallimard in 1945 as the title for its Série Noire crime fiction imprint. In the English-speaking world, the term originated as a cinematic one—film noir. This term again first appeared in France, in 1946, though it did not enjoy wide use until the 1970s. Film noir refers to cinematic works based on novels of both the hardboiled and noir traditions, exhibiting realism and postwar disillusionment as influenced by German Expressionism.

James M. Cain is regarded as an American pioneer of the hardboiled and noir genres. Other important early American writers in the noir genre include Cornell Woolrich, Jim Thompson, Horace McCoy, and David Goodis. In the 1950s, Fawcett Books' Gold Medal imprint was instrumental in releasing noir and crime novels from such writers as Elliott Chaze, Charles Williams, Gil Brewer, Harry Whittington, Peter Rabe, and Lionel White, as well as Goodis and Thompson. In the 1980s, American publisher Black Lizard would re-release many of these works. Today, publisher Akashic Books features an elaborate line of noir short-story anthologies.

Prominent European authors of the genre include Jean-Claude Izzo and Massimo Carlotto. According to Italian publisher Sandro Ferri, "Mediterranean noir" is remarkable for its attention to the duality of Mediterranean life:

The prevailing vision in the novels belonging to the genre known as Mediterranean noir is a pessimistic one. Authors and their literary inventions look upon the cities of the Mediterranean and see places that have been broken, battered, and distorted by crime. There is always a kind of dualism that pervades these works. On one hand, there is the Mediterranean lifestyle—fine wine and fine food, friendship, conviviality, solidarity, blue skies and limpid seas—an art of living brought almost to perfection. On the other hand, violence, corruption, greed, and abuses of power.

Of latter-day novelists who write in both the hardboiled and noir modes, the most prominent is James Ellroy. Calling noir "the most scrutinized offshoot of the hard-boiled school of fiction", he wrote:

The thrill of noir is the rush of moral forfeit and the abandonment to titillation. The social importance of noir is its grounding in the big themes of race, class, gender, and systemic corruption. The overarching and lasting appeal of noir is that it makes doom fun.

== Rural/outback noir ==
A sub-genre of noir fiction has been named "rural noir" in the US, and sometimes "outback noir" in Australia. Many rural noir novels have been adapted for film and TV series in both countries, such as Ozark, No Country for Old Men, and Big Sky in the US, and Troppo, The Dry, Scrublands, and High Country (2024) in Australia.

Norris Eppes suggests that Intruder in the Dust (1948) by William Faulkner and Deliverance (1970) by James Dickey were the earliest examples of rural noir. He interviewed seven authors who write rural noir fiction: Brian Panowich, Karin Slaughter, Attica Locke, Ace Atkins, Tom Franklin, John Hart, and James Sallis, who all give their opinions on the genre. Tom Bouman thinks that rural noir has its roots further back, in the 19th century, and cites the first 20th century novel to contribute to the trend as The Postman Always Rings Twice (1934) by James M. Cain.

In Australia, outback noir increasingly includes issues relating to Indigenous Australians, such as the dispossession of land from Aboriginal peoples and racism. Filmmaker Ivan Sen is known for his exploration of such themes in his Mystery Road TV series and film of the same name with its prequel Goldstone, and his more recent award-winning film Limbo (2023).
