= Disturbia (film) =

2007 film by D. J. Caruso

- Theatrical release poster
- Directed by: D. J. Caruso
- Screenplay by: Christopher Landon; Carl Ellsworth
- Story by: Christopher Landon
- Produced by: Joe Medjuck; E. Bennett Walsh; Jackie Marcus
- Starring: Shia LaBeouf; David Morse; Sarah Roemer; Carrie-Anne Moss
- Cinematography: Rogier Stoffers
- Edited by: Jim Page
- Music by: Geoff Zanelli
- Production companies: Cold Spring Pictures; The Montecito Picture Company
- Distributed by: DreamWorks Pictures (through Paramount Pictures)
- Release dates: April 4, 2007 (Hollywood); April 13, 2007 (United States)
- Running time: 104 minutes
- Country: United States
- Language: English
- Budget: $20 million
- Box office: $118.1 million

Disturbia is a 2007 American psychological thriller film directed by D. J. Caruso and written by Christopher Landon and Carl Ellsworth. It stars Shia LaBeouf, David Morse, Sarah Roemer and Carrie-Anne Moss. Partially inspired by Alfred Hitchcock's Rear Window, the film is about a 17-year-old who, after being placed on house arrest for assaulting his schoolteacher, spies on his neighbors in suspicion that one of them is a serial killer.

Disturbia premiered in Hollywood on April 4, 2007 and was released by Paramount Pictures in the United States on April 13, 2007. It grossed $118.1 million against a budget of $20 million and received generally positive reviews from critics.

== Plot ==
Seventeen-year-old Kale Brecht and his father spend an idyllic day fishing. While Kale is driving them home, a car accident kills his father. One year later, Kale is a troubled, sullen, withdrawn outcast, wracked with guilt and grief over his father's death. During Spanish class, Señor Gutierrez reprimands Kale for poor behavior and insensitively mentions his father, inciting Kale to attack him. A sympathetic judge sentences Kale to three months' house arrest and orders him to wear an ankle monitor and a proximity sensor.

At the Brecht house, Detective Parker explains how the ankle monitor functions. The overseeing police officer is Señor Gutierrez's cousin. Kale spends his confinement watching television and playing video games, while neglecting household chores, until his frustrated mother, Julie, cancels his Xbox Live and iTunes subscription and cuts his TV cord. Bored, Kale observes his neighborhood with binoculars. His neighbors include the solitary Robert Turner and Ashley Carlson, an attractive teenage girl whose family has recently moved in next door. When Kale trips his proximity sensor while chasing pranking neighborhood boys, the police quickly arrive and Officer Gutierrez roughly handcuffs Kale. After receiving a warning, Kale sets up a marked perimeter zone and is careful to stay inside.

Late one night, Kale grows suspicious when Turner returns home in his classic Ford Mustang with a dented fender. The vehicle matches the description of a car mentioned in a newsflash about a serial killer at large. Kale befriends Ashley and, together with Kale's best friend, Ronnie, they begin spying on Turner. When Turner has a female guest, they see her frantically running from him inside the house; however, she appears to drive away later.

Kale becomes jealous when he sees Ashley flirting with popular classmates at her pool party. When he blasts disruptive non-party-related music at them, Ashley arrives and angrily confronts him. He reveals his romantic attraction to her, and they kiss. The following day, Kale asks Ashley to follow Turner to the supermarket while Ronnie obtains the code to Turner's garage door controller. Turner intercepts Ashley in the parking lot and sternly warns her to stay away. Shaken, Ashley stops helping with Kale's investigation. Ronnie realizes he left his phone in Turner's car and breaks into his garage to retrieve it as Kale watches him from a distance. Ronnie gets trapped when the garage door closes. When Kale tries to rescue him, he trips his ankle monitor. The police arrive and search the garage, as Kale accuses Turner of murder. However, they only find a bag containing a roadkill deer.

Julie goes to Turner's house and convinces him not to press charges against Kale. Ronnie, who escaped Turner's house, shows Kale the video he shot while inside. Zooming in on a single frame, Kale sees what looks like a woman's corpse through a heat vent grate. Meanwhile, Turner incapacitates and binds Julie. Turner enters the Brecht house and knocks out Ronnie with a bat. After binding and gagging Kale, he reveals he will frame Kale for murdering Ronnie and Julie and then make it appear that he committed suicide. However, Ashley arrives, distracting Turner and allowing Kale to club him in the face. Ashley unties Kale's hands and mouth. They jump from the bedroom window into her pool, setting off the ankle monitor and notifying the police.

Kale enters Turner's house and frantically searches for Julie. While there, he finds previous victims' corpses. When Officer Gutierrez arrives, Turner kills him. Kale finds his mother bound and gagged in the cellar. Turner appears, slashes Kale in the back and pins him to a wall. Before Turner can kill Kale, Julie stabs his leg with a screwdriver, allowing Kale to impale Turner with gardening shears.

Following the harrowing ordeal, Kale's ankle bracelet is removed early for good behavior. Kale exacts revenge on the pranking neighborhood boys before kissing Ashley as Ronnie playfully videotapes them.

== Cast ==
- Shia LaBeouf as Kale Brecht, a troubled high school teenager who is traumatized by his father's death and placed under house arrest after assaulting his teacher
- David Morse as Robert Turner, a serial murderer
- Sarah Roemer as Ashley Carlson, Kale's girlfriend
- Carrie-Anne Moss as Julie Brecht, Kale's mother who gives strict authority to her son
- Aaron Yoo as Ronald "Ronnie" Chu, Kale's best friend
- Jose Pablo Cantillo as Officer Gutierrez, a police officer and the cousin of Kale's teacher who monitors Kale's house arrest while abusing his power and tormenting him
- Matt Craven as Daniel "Danny" Brecht, Kale's father who dies in a car crash
- Viola Davis as Detective Parker, the detective in charge of Kale's house arrest case
- Luciano Rauso and Brandon and Daniel Caruso as the Greenwood boys, a trio of neighbors who prank and humiliate Kale
- Kevin Quinn as Mr. Carlson
- Elyse Mirto as Mrs. Carlson
- Suzanne Rico and Kent Shocknek as news anchors
- Rene Rivera as Señor Gutierrez, Kale's Spanish teacher
- Amanda Walsh as Minnie Tyco
- Charles Carroll as judge
- Gillian Shure as Turner's club girl
- Dominic Daniel as Officer Fox
- Lisa Robin as big wheel mom
- Cindy Lou Adkins as Mrs. Greenwood, mother of the Greenwood boys

== Production ==
=== Development and writing ===
As Christopher Landon heard an NPR show discussing Martha Stewart being on house arrest, he started thinking on what he would do in a similar condition, "already sort of being a voyeur, I figured that I would just be spying on my neighbors all the time.” He made the protagonist a teenager dealing with his father's death to reflect his own life experiences. Landon wrote a spec script based on that, which ended up sold to the Montecito Picture Company, who brought it into development at DreamWorks Pictures.

Executive producer Steven Spielberg arranged for Shia LaBeouf to be on the casting shortlist for this film because he was impressed by LaBeouf's work on Holes. D. J. Caruso auditioned over a hundred males for the role in five weeks before settling on LaBeouf as he was looking for someone "who guys would really like and respond to, because he wasn't going to be such a pretty boy". LaBeouf was attracted to the role because of Caruso's 2002 film The Salton Sea, which he complimented as one of his favorite films. Before filming started, the two watched the thriller films Rear Window starring James Stewart, Straw Dogs starring Dustin Hoffman, and The Conversation starring Gene Hackman. They also viewed the 1989 romantic film Say Anything... and "mixed all the movies together". LaBeouf says he spoke to people on house arrest and locked himself in a room with the bracelet to feel what the confinement of house arrest is like. He commented in an interview, "...it's hard. I'm not going to say it's harder than jail, but it's tough. House arrest is hard because everything is available. [...] The temptation sucks. That's the torture of it." Caruso gave him the freedom to improvise whenever necessary to make the dialogue appeal to the current generation.

=== Filming ===
Disturbia was filmed on location in the cities of Whittier, California and Pasadena, California. Filming took place from January 6, 2006, to April 29, 2006. The homes of Kale and Mr. Turner, which were supposed to be across from each other, were actually located in two different cities.

During filming, LaBeouf began a program that saw him gain twenty five pounds of muscle in preparation for his future films Transformers and Indiana Jones and the Kingdom of the Crystal Skull.

According to LaBeouf, David Morse, who plays Mr. Turner, did not speak to LaBeouf or any of the other younger actors while on set. LaBeouf said, "When we finished filming, he was very friendly. But he's a method actor, and as long as we were shooting, he wouldn't say a word to us."

== Music ==
=== Soundtrack ===
Disturbia: Original Motion Picture Soundtrack is a soundtrack to the film of the same name, released on March 4, 2007, in the United States by Lakeshore Records.

=== Score ===
Disturbia: Original Motion Picture Score is a score to the film of the same name. It is composed by Geoff Zanelli, conducted by Bruce Fowler, performed by the Hollywood Studio Symphony and produced by Skip Williamson. It was released on July 10, 2007, in the United States by Lakeshore Records.

== Release ==
The film was initially assigned an R rating by the MPAA for "violence and terror". Following an appeal by the filmmakers, the rating was reduced to PG-13, with the final rating citing "sequences of terror and violence, and some sensuality."

=== Home media ===
The film was released on DVD and HD DVD on August 7, 2007, and on Blu-ray Disc on March 15, 2008.

In the "Making of Disturbia" section of the DVD's special features section it is revealed that LaBeouf and Morse did not have much contact off-set, so as to make the fight scenes at the end of the movie as realistic as possible.

=== Lawsuit ===
The Sheldon Abend Revocable Trust filed a lawsuit against Spielberg, DreamWorks, its parent company Viacom, and Universal Studios, Inc. on September 5, 2008. The suit alleged that Disturbia infringed on the rights to Cornell Woolrich's 1942 short story "It Had to Be Murder" (the basis for the Alfred Hitchcock film Rear Window), and that DreamWorks never bothered to obtain motion picture rights to the intellectual property and evaded compensating the rights holder for the alleged appropriation. (Ownership of the copyright in Woolrich's original story "It Had to Be Murder" and its use as the basis for the movie Rear Window was previously litigated before the United States Supreme Court in Stewart v. Abend, 495 U.S. 207 (1990).) Contrary to some media reports, the claim was based on the original Woolrich short story, not the movie Rear Window.

This claim was rejected by the U.S. District Court in Abend v. Spielberg, 748 F.Supp.2d 200 (S.D.N.Y. 2010), on the basis that the original Woolrich short story and Disturbia are only similar at a high level of generality and abstraction. "Their similarities derive entirely from unprotectible elements and the total look and feel of the works is so distinct that no reasonable trier of fact could find the works substantially similar within the meaning of copyright law." Disturbia contained many subplots not in the original short story.

After the dismissal of the copyright claim in federal court, the Abend Trust filed another lawsuit in California state court against Universal Studios and the Hitchcock Estate on October 28, 2010, for a breach of contract claim based on earlier agreements which allegedly restricted the use of ideas from the original Woolrich short story and the movie Rear Window whether or not the ideas are copyright protectable, that the defendants had entered into with the Abend Trust after the Supreme Court's Stewart v. Abend decision.

== Reception ==
=== Box office ===
Disturbia grossed $80.2 million in North America and $37.9 million in other territories for a worldwide total of $118.1 million, against a budget of $20 million.

In the United States and Canada, Disturbia was released alongside Year of the Dog and Pathfinder, and opened first at the box office with $22.2 million. The film remained number one at the box office for the next two weeks, grossing $13 million and $9 million, respectively. In its fourth week, it earned $5.7 million and finished second behind the record-breaking Spider-Man 3 ($151.1 million).

=== Critical response ===
On the review aggregator website Rotten Tomatoes, 69% of 175 critics' reviews are positive, with an average rating of 6.30/10. The website's consensus reads: "Aside from its clichéd resolution, Disturbia is a tense, subtle thriller with a noteworthy performance from Shia LaBeouf." On Metacritic, the film has a score of 62 out of 100 based on reviews from 28 critics, indicating "generally favorable" reviews. Audiences polled by CinemaScore gave the film an average grade of "A−" on an A+ to F scale.

The film earned a "two thumbs up" rating from Richard Roeper and A.O. Scott (filling in for Roger Ebert), with Roeper saying, "This is a cool little thriller with big scares and fine performances." William Thomas of Empire gave it 3 out of 5 stars and wrote: "despite the 'edgy' title, Disturbia is content to be a multiplex-friendly teen thriller with a higher degree of slickness and smarts than most of its contemporaries."

David Denby of The New Yorker judged the film "a travesty", adding: "The dopiness of it, however, may be an indication not so much of cinematic ineptitude as of the changes in a movie culture that was once devoted to adults and is now rather haplessly and redundantly devoted to kids." Peter Bradshaw of The Guardian gave it 2 out of 5 stars, writing: "Despite the interesting set-up, the action degenerates into obvious implausibility and silliness - fatal for a suspense thriller - and boredom sets in."

=== Accolades ===
Year	Award	Category	Result
2007	Dublin Film Critics Circle Awards	Breakthrough Award – Shia LaBeouf	Runner-up
2007	Golden Schmoes Awards	Breakthrough Performance of the Year – Shia LaBeouf	Nominated
2007	Kids' Choice Awards	Favorite Movie Star – Shia LaBeouf	Nominated
2007	MTV Movie Awards	Best Kiss – Shia LaBeouf, Sarah Roemer	Nominated
2007	Teen Choice Awards	Choice Movie: Horror/Thriller	Won
2007	Teen Choice Awards	Choice Movie Actor: Horror/Thriller – Shia LaBeouf	Won
2007	Teen Choice Awards	Choice Movie: Breakout Male – Shia LaBeouf	Won
2008	People's Choice Awards	Favorite Movie Drama	Nominated
2008	ASCAP Film and Television Music Awards	Top Box Office Films – Geoff Zanelli	Won
2008	Empire Awards	Best Thriller	Nominated

== See also ==
- List of films featuring surveillance
