= Victor Licata =

American mass murderer (c. 1912–1950)

- Born: 1912; Tampa, Florida, U.S.
- Died: December 4, 1950 (aged 37–38); Chattahoochee, Florida, U.S.
- Cause of death: Suicide by hanging
- Status: Deceased
- Criminal charge: First degree murder
- Penalty: Declared mentally unfit to stand trial

Details
- Victims: 5
- Date: October 16, 1933
- Weapon: Axe
- Date apprehended: October 17, 1933
- Imprisoned at: Florida State Hospital for the Insane

Victor Licata (c. 1912 – December 4, 1950), also known as the Dream Slayer, was an American mass murderer who used an axe to kill his family in Ybor City, Tampa, Florida, on October 16, 1933. The killings, which were reported by the media as the work of an "axe-murdering marijuana addict", were adduced as prima facie evidence that there was a link between recreational drugs, such as cannabis, and crime. This led to the killings being used in 1930s anti-drug campaigns against marijuana.

Recent research has revealed that marijuana was never referenced in any of Licata's psychiatric reports nor was it considered a contributing factor in the homicides. Instead, it has been confirmed that Licata had been diagnosed with a mental illness and measures were being taken to institutionalize him prior to the murders.

Two weeks after the murder of his family, 21-year-old Licata was declared unfit to stand trial for reasons of insanity and committed to the Florida State Hospital for the Insane. He escaped, was later recaptured and hanged himself in prison in 1950.

== Murders ==
On October 16, 1933, 21-year-old Victor Licata used an axe to murder his parents, two brothers, and a sister while they were asleep. All died from blows to the head. The next morning police discovered a confused Licata in a bedroom of the family home. He was wearing a clean pressed shirt and trousers, although beneath the clean clothes his body was smeared in blood.

Despite evidence that Licata had a history of mental illness, police and the press made unattributed claims that he was "addicted" to marijuana. On October 17, 1933, the Tampa Bay Times wrote:

W. D. Bush, city chief detective, said he had made an investigation prior to the crime and learned the slayer had been addicted to smoking marijuana cigarettes for more than six months.

However, a day later the Chief of Tampa Police Department downplayed the role the drug had in the murders, although he pledged himself to the cause of marijuana prohibition:

Maybe the weed only had a small indirect part in the alleged insanity of the youth, but I am declaring now and for all time that the increasing use of this narcotic must stop and will be stopped.

— October 18, 1933

An October 20, 1933, editorial on page six of the Tampa Morning Tribune was entitled "Stop This Murderous Smoke". The editorial writer called for the prohibition of marijuana:

[I]t may or may not be wholly true that the pernicious marijuana cigarette is responsible for the murderous mania of a Tampa young man in exterminating all the members of his family within his reach — but whether or not the poisonous mind-wrecking weed is mainly accountable for the tragedy its sale should not be and should never have been permitted here or elsewhere.

Licata was never prosecuted for murdering his family, as the prosecutor refused to indict anyone ruled to be insane. He was examined by psychiatrists eleven days after his arrest and was diagnosed with "dementia praecox with homicidal tendencies". This made him "overtly psychotic" with a condition that was "acute and chronic". It was determined that he was "subject to hallucinations accompanied by homicidal impulses and periods of excitement". He was committed to the Florida Hospital for the Insane in Chattahoochee, Florida on November 3, 1933. His medical file does not reference his marijuana usage. On October 15, 1945, Licata and four other patients escaped. All were quickly recaptured, except Licata. Years later, he visited a cousin in New Orleans and was recaptured by the police with the assistance of the cousin. He was then incarcerated at the Florida State Prison in Raiford, Florida. A few months later, on December 4, 1950, Licata killed himself by hanging.

in 2019, Kurt Schleicher, the owner of the Licata family home, suggested that the family was murdered by the mafia and that Victor was framed. He had discovered hidden alcohol bottles in the home, suggesting that the family was involved in bootlegging. This led him to theorize that business competitors had them killed. A local mafia historian expressed doubts, noting that most mafia murders at the time were carried out with guns, not axes.

== Anti-drug propaganda ==
Even though evidence indicated that Licata had long been experiencing psychosis, the Press turned the Licata case into a drug-use cause célèbre. Evidence shows that a year before the murders, Tampa police had filed a petition to have Licata institutionalized for mental illness. But it was withdrawn when the family vowed to increase their oversight of his behavior. Mental illness ran in the Licata family, and prison psychiatrists speculated that he had inherited his insanity from his parents who were first cousins. One of the brothers he slew was a diagnosed schizophrenic and his paternal granduncle and two paternal cousins had also been institutionalized for mental illness.

Nevertheless, the role that marijuana had to play in the murders led it to be cited by proponents of anti-drug laws as evidence of "marijuana-crime-insanity". The case served to inspire media depictions of normal people driven to criminal insanity by the "evil weed" such as the notorious 1936 exploitation film Tell Your Children (a.k.a. Reefer Madness).

In 1941, Cornell Woolrich under his pen name William Irish published the dime novel Marihuana: A Drug-Crazed Killer at Large. The story is about a man who goes on a murder spree after being exposed to marijuana for the first time. The book exploits the marijuana-crime-insanity trope popularized by drug prohibitionists who abused the Licata case as an example.

The foremost proponent of the Licata story was Harry Anslinger, Commissioner of the Federal Bureau of Narcotics from 1930 until 1962, who abused the case to insist that marijuana usage caused insanity and criminality. In his highly influential 1937 article "Marijuana, Assassin of Youth" he wrote about Licata and his crimes. Anslinger reused the story during his testimony at the Congress hearings for the Marihuana Tax Act of 1937:

It was an unprovoked crime some years ago which brought the first realization that the age-old drug had gained a foothold in America. An entire family was murdered by a youthful addict in Florida. When officers arrived at the home they found the youth staggering about in a human, slaughterhouse. With an ax he had killed his father, his mother, two brothers, and a sister. He seemed to be in a daze ...

He had no recollection of having committed the multiple crime. The officers knew him ordinarily as a sane, rather quiet young man; now he was pitifully crazed. They sought the reason. The boy said he had been in the habit of smoking something which youthful friends called "muggles", a childish name for marijuana ...

As this is written, a bill to give the federal government control over marijuana has been introduced in Congress ... It has the backing of ... the United States Treasury Department, including the Bureau of Narcotics, through which Uncle Sam fights the dope evil. It is a revenue bill, modeled after other narcotic laws which make use of the taxing power to bring about regulation and control.

Anslinger characterized Licata's hallucinations as a marijuana-induced dream in notes he took of the case:

A twenty-one-year-old boy in FLORIDA killed his parents, two brothers and a sister while under the influence of a Marihuana "dream" which he later described to law enforcement officials. He told rambling stories of being attacked in his bedroom by "his uncle, a strange old woman and two men and two women," whom he said hacked off his arms and otherwise mutilated him; later in the dream, he saw "real blood" dripping from an axe.

In the 1960s, Anslinger served as the U.S. representative to the United Nations Narcotics Commission from 1962 to 1964. In 1966, the United Nations publication Bulletin of Narcotics again referenced the Licata case in an article entitled "Marihuana and Crime." The article was written by Dr. James C. Munch, a member of the U.S. Bureau of Narcotics's Advisory Committee. In a chart appended to the article, Munch documented "Cases of crimes in the United States after use, and under the influence, of marihuana." In this chart, Munch anonymously referenced the Licata killings, stating, "Murdered his father, mother, sister, and two brothers with an ax, while under the influence of marihuana. Didn't know of all this until the next morning."

Munch, a pharmacologist who had been employed by the Food and Drug Administration, had testified on the pernicious effects of marijuana during the 1937 congressional Marijuana Tax Act hearings. His testimony followed Anslinger's appearance at the hearings.

== Sources ==
- Sloman, Larry; et al. (Introduction by William S. Burroughs, afterword by Michael Simmons) (1998) [1979]. Reefer madness: The history of marijuana in America. New York City, New York, United States of America: St. Martin's Griffin. ISBN 9780312195236. LCCN 98036366 – via Internet Archive.
