= The Black Curtain =

1941 mystery novel by Cornell Woolrich

- First edition cover
- Author: Cornell Woolrich
- Language: English
- Genre: Mystery novel
- Publisher: Simon and Schuster
- Publication date: 1941
- Publication place: United States
- Media type: Print (Hardback & Paperback)
- Pages: 305 pp
- OCLC: 7822613
- Preceded by: The Bride Wore Black
- Followed by: Marihuana

The Black Curtain is a mystery novel written by Cornell Woolrich. The book was initially published in 1941 by Simon and Schuster.

== Plot ==
The story concerns a man with amnesia, named Frank Townsend. He cannot remember anything from the previous three years of his life. As it turns out, he may be a suspected murderer. He struggles to find a loophole in the overwhelming evidence.

== Film and broadcast adaptations ==
There has been one cinematic adaptation of the novel, one on radio, and one much later done for television

- Street of Chance (1942) (movie), directed by Jack Hively
- Suspense, dramatic adaptation adapted by George Corey, Produced and Directed by William Spier and featuring Cary Grant as the amnesiac (CBS Radio, 2 December 1943)
- The Alfred Hitchcock Hour – "The Black Curtain", directed by Sydney Pollack, broadcast November 15, 1962
