= The Dancing Detective =

1946 short story collection by American crime writer Cornell Woolrich

- First edition cover
- Author: Cornell Woolrich (as William Irish)
- Publisher: Lippincott
- Publication date: 1946
- Publication place: United States

The Dancing Detective is a 1946 short story collection by American crime writer Cornell Woolrich under the pseudonym William Irish, published by Lippincott.

It comprises eight short stories all revolving around Woolrich's trademark themes of suspense, detection, horror and macabre irony.

== Story summaries ==
- The Dancing Detective – the title story revolves around Ginger, a ten-cents-a-dance-girl who is forced to help investigators track down a serial killer preying on the girls working at her dance hall. The only clues they have is the distinctive ring he has been wearing on his pinkie so long his flesh has grown around it – and his passion for dancing with his victim's corpses to the song Poor Butterfly.
- Two Fellows in a Furnished Room – when Red decided to take a discreet walk so his roommate Dixon could spend some time alone with his girl, he had no idea he would return to the scene of a brutal murder and Dixon having vanished, on the run. He is the only person who can prove his friend's innocence, but there is just one catch. He does not believe him any more than the police does.
- The Light in the Window – One night, a soldier, having just returned highly disturbed from the war waits outside his girlfriend's darkened apartment to surprise her as she arrives home. But suddenly, the apartment light flashes on and he watches in horror as his old friend comes out of the building boasting of the "time he's had". The soldier, convinced that the girl he loves has been unfaithful goes into her apartment with one thing on his mind; prove her guilt and then punish her.
- Silent as the Grave – Frances and Kenneth had true love, nobody ever doubted that, at least Frances did not. So on the night of his proposal, she swears to be as silent as the grave when he confesses to having murdered a man who crossed him years before. The two get married and she never thinks of it again, until the colleague who unjustly gets Kenneth fired is killed and a potentially innocent man ends up on death row.
- The Detective's Dilemma – A European prince visits a private detective predicting his own murder. The culprit – his wife, a beautiful heiress, and her weapon – his rare and deadly blood disorder, haemophilia. Sure enough, a few weeks later he befalls a mysterious accident in the night and is killed. But the detective is left torn between two sides of the story, the prince's and his wife's. Is she really a cold blooded killer or is she being framed from beyond the grave?
- Fur Jacket – When the body of an exceptionally well-dressed woman is found by the side of the road in a seeming hit-and-run, Police Detective Evans is instantly suspicious of her ex-husband Colin Hughes, whom she was on her way to meet. But Hughes as a rock-solid alibi, he was at his girlfriend's party at the time of the killing. Evans knows he is guilty though, and he knows the key to proving it is the victim's fur jacket.
- Leg Man – The story follows Clint Burgess, a young "leg man" (journalist) working for the city newspaper. He dreams of becoming a proper reporter, and opportunity strikes when he seems to be the only one who can see something is not quite right about the seemingly cut-and-dried case of a murdered pub landlord. The only problem is nobody will believe him, not even the police, so Burgess is forced to set out against a local gang to solve the crime himself.
- The Fingernail – the shortest story in the book, an example of microfiction. A friend of retired Inspector Morrow takes him to his favorite restaurant. Morrow recalls the story of the only other time he visited the establishment years before, on the hunt of a murderer whose whole fingernail had been torn off whilst committing the crime.
