= Officer (2001 film) =

- DVD Cover
- Directed by: Naeem Sha
- Written by: Naeem Sha
- Produced by: Faruq Nadiadwala
- Starring: Sunil Shetty; Raveena Tandon; Danny Denzongpa; Sadashiv Amrapurkar; Shahbaz Khan
- Cinematography: V. Shaukat
- Edited by: Zafar Sultan
- Music by: Deepak Chowdhary
- Production company: F. A. Films
- Release date: 2 March 2001
- Running time: 169 mins
- Country: India
- Language: Hindi

Officer is a 2001 action thriller film starring Suniel Shetty directed by Naeem Sha. It was released on 2 March 2001 after a long delay and was a flop, having been criticised for the delay and the differing appearances of the actors in different scenes, due to the time lag. The film is inspired by the 1958 film Vertigo (film)

== Plot ==
Investigating officer and witness protection agent Sagar Chauhan (Sunil Shetty), is appointed by industrialist Pratap Rai (Danny Denzongpa) to protect his mentally disturbed wife Meenal (Raveena Tandon), but learns that the people around him are not who they seem to be and their intentions are not what he thinks they are. Soon Sagar realizes that he is in a game of deception and crime, and must get to the roots of it to find and expose all involved, even if it is someone who loves him.

== Cast ==
- Sunil Shetty as Officer Sagar Chauhan
- Raveena Tandon as Meenal Patel / Namita Sharma
- Danny Denzongpa as
  - Dushyant Singh (after plastic surgery)
  - Pratap Rai: Dushyant's fake identity
- Sadashiv Amrapurkar as Lobo
- Yusuf Khurram as Gopal Pandey
- Shehzad Khan
- Sonia Kapoor as Pratap Rai's Servant
- Pramod Moutho as Dhanraj Thakur
- Vishwajeet Pradhan as Driver
- Tej Sapru as Officer Pradhan
- Anup Shukla as police Officer
- Shahbaz Khan as Awasti

== Soundtrack ==
Officer

Soundtrack album by Deepak Chaudhary Rajesh Roshan
- Released: 10 August 2000
- Genre: Feature film soundtrack
- Label: Universal Music India

#	Title	Singer(s)
1	"Don't Break My Heart"	Shaan, Jaspinder Narula
2	"Ek Yaar Maanga Tha"	Sonu Nigam
3	"Kaisa Sama"	Kumar Sanu, Alka Yagnik
4	"Na Jaane Kyon"	Babul Supriyo, Jaspinder Narula
5	"Na Jaane Kyon (Sad)"	Babul Supriyo
6	"Pari Hoon Main"	Jaspinder Narula
7	"Phoolon Se Rang"	Kumar Sanu, Preeti Uttam

== See also ==
- Remakes of films by Alfred Hitchcock
