= The Bride Wore Black (novel) =

1940 novel by Cornell Woolrich

- First edition cover
- Author: Cornell Woolrich
- Language: English
- Genre: Crime novel
- Publisher: Simon & Schuster
- Publication date: 1940
- Publication place: United States
- Media type: Print (Hardback and paperback)

The Bride Wore Black is a 1940 American novel written by Cornell Woolrich, initially published under the pseudonym William Irish. Although it was Woolrich's seventh published novel, it was the first in the noir/pulp style for which he would become known, his previous novels having been Jazz Age fiction about the wealthy and privileged.

In 1968, The Bride Wore Black was adapted into a film of the same name by the French director François Truffaut.

== Overview ==
The novel opens with a quote from Guy de Maupassant's short story "Le Horla" (in English as "The Diary of a Madman"): "For to kill is the great law set by nature in the heart of existence! There is nothing more beautiful and honorable than killing!"

The structure of the novel, Woolrich's first as a 'pulp' writer, is discussed by Eddie Duggan in his article "Writing in the Darkness: The World of Cornell Woolrich".

== Plot ==
Julie, a grief-stricken woman, announces she is leaving the city and buys a random train ticket. She bids farewell to her family and friends but gets off at the next station. She takes a room under an assumed name and erases all trace of her identity. Over the next two years, she appears in the lives of various men and kills them. Bliss, a well-off ladies' man, is celebrating his engagement as she crashes the party. Corey, another guest, tries to romance her, but she deflects his interest, and lures Bliss onto the balcony; when they are alone, she pushes him off and calmly leaves before anyone discovers what happened. Mitchell, a lonely romantic living in a squalid residential hotel, is drawn out by her mysterious charm and poisoned. Moran, a married businessman with a young son, is left alone with his child when his wife is decoyed out of town by a false telegram; Julie then shows up claiming to be the boy's kindergarten teacher and there to help the family, and then tricks Moran into going into a small closet which she then locks and blocks the cracks with putty, so he suffocates. She models for Ferguson, an artist, who is fascinated by her and has her pose as the goddess Diana. Corey is a friend of Ferguson as well, and vaguely remembers her. He takes her to his apartment in an attempt to seduce her, but she finds his gun, and holding him at gunpoint, warns him to stay away from her. She departs, leaving the gun behind. Corey racks his brain and finally remembers where he met her, and realizes she is a murderess. He tries to call Ferguson to warn him, but she has already killed him with an arrow.

Wanger, a police detective, has been following her crimes. Fascinated by the different method each time, her constantly changing appearance, and how she refuses to allow any innocent parties (especially women) take the blame for her crimes, he is determined to catch her. He and Corey eventually piece together that Bliss, Moran, and Ferguson had been members of an informal card club, the "Friday Night Fiends", that met on Fridays in a bar, played cards, and then drove tipsily around the city in a car they owned together. Mitchell was their favorite bartender who joined them on their joyrides. Wanger tracks down the last member the group, Holmes, now a successful novelist.

Julie infiltrates Holmes' house, disguised as a middle-aged typist. She attempts to booby-trap Holmes' favorite chair, but when he forces her to sit in it, she panics and reveals the plan. At this point it's revealed that Wanger had warned Holmes and had taken his place for the past few weeks, waiting for her. She reveals her story: that she had just married Nick Killeen, and they were leaving the church together, when the car driven by the Friday Night Fiends drove by, and Nick was shot and killed. She remembered the license plate number and tracked down the occupants from the records. Swearing vengeance, she killed the men she held responsible for Nick's murder.

Wanger then reveals the truth: the men she murdered were innocent. The police had known all along that the shot had been fired from a window across the street; there were powder burns on the curtains and a spent casing found, but they kept the information to themselves in order to trap the real killer. The Fiends driving by was just a coincidence. Nick Killeen had been a criminal attempting to go straight for Julie, but he had been killed by his former associate, who feared that Nick could tip off the authorities and also wanted Nick's share of their money. The real killer was Corey, who hadn't known Julie, and whom she had never met. At first she doesn't believe him, but realizes he is right and is horrified, not only that she killed innocent men, but that she'd had a chance to kill the real culprit with the same gun he'd used to kill her husband, but let it slip through her fingers. She allows herself to be led away, defeated and demoralized. Corey has been under arrest for weeks and will be tried; she accepts that she has lost and has to pay for her crimes.

== Sources ==
- Dictionnaire du roman policier : 1841-2005. Auteurs, personnages, œuvres, thèmes, collections, éditeurs (in French). Paris: Fayard. 2005. pp. 474–475. ISBN 978-2-915793-51-2. OCLC 62533410.
- Dictionnaire des littératures policières (in French). Nantes: Editions Joseph K. 2007. p. 1030. ISBN 978-2-910-68644-4. OCLC 315873251.
- Eddie Duggan (1999) 'Writing in the darkness: the world of Cornell Woolrich' CrimeTime 2.6 pp. 113–126. (in English)
