= I Wouldn't Be in Your Shoes =

1948 film by William Nigh

- Theatrical release poster
- Directed by: William Nigh
- Screenplay by: Steve Fisher
- Based on: I Wouldn't Be in Your Shoes by Cornell Woolrich
- Produced by: Walter Mirisch
- Starring: Don Castle; Elyse Knox
- Cinematography: Mack Stengler
- Edited by: Roy V. Livingston
- Music by: Edward J. Kay
- Production company: Monogram Pictures
- Distributed by: Monogram Pictures
- Release date: 23 May 1948
- Running time: 71 minutes
- Country: United States
- Language: English

I Wouldn't Be in Your Shoes is a 1948 American film noir directed by William Nigh, starring Don Castle and Elyse Knox. It was based on a novella of the same name by Cornell Woolrich with a screenplay by fellow pulp writer Steve Fisher.

== Plot ==
Vaudeville dancers Tom Quinn and his wife Ann are barely getting by on her job at a dance hall. He anxiously awaits her return from work, where she is often delayed by a generously tipping customer she calls "Santa Claus", who turns out to be police detective Clint Judd. Depressed and anxious, Tom impulsively throws his only pair of tap dancing shoes at howling cats outside his window. When he immediately searches for them, he cannot find them, but they mysteriously reappear outside the apartment door the next morning.

Otis Wantner, a reclusive old neighbor rumored to have a large stash of old, high-value currency, is found murdered, and Tom's shoe prints are found at the scene. Unaware of the killing, Tom finds a wallet containing two thousand dollars in old bills. He wants to turn them in to the police, but Ann persuades him to wait and see if anyone places an ad in the newspaper. After three days, they decide to spend some of the money, $200.00 each. As a result, he is arrested for the murder.

Tom is convicted and sentenced to death. His wife implores Judd to help her find the real killer. John L. Kosloff, a former boarder at the same house, has also spent a large amount of money, which he claims he inherited from his recently deceased mother. Judd does not believe him and takes him into custody, but he later proves to have a solid alibi.

As the hours tick down to Tom's midnight execution, Judd makes it clear to Ann that he is obsessed with her. He reveals that he purchased a fancy apartment and furnished it just for her. The detective claims he paid for it with his entire life savings. When Ann rebuffs him, he angrily reaches into his pocket, throws one last tip into her lap, and starts to leave. Ann sees that it is an old note and realizes that he is the murderer. She appears to change her mind and agrees to go see the apartment with him, but manages to call the police first. At the apartment, she gets him to confess what he has done, and the listening policemen emerge from hiding. When he goes for his gun, they are forced to shoot him dead.

== Cast ==
- Don Castle as Tom J. Quinn
- Elyse Knox as Ann Quinn
- Regis Toomey as Inspector Clint Judd
- Charles D. Brown as Inspector Stevens
- Rory Mallinson as Harry, 1st Detective
- Robert Lowell as John L. Kosloff
- Steve Darrell as District Attorney
- Bill Kennedy as 2nd Detective
- John Doucette as a Prisoner
- Ray Teal as a Guard

== Sources ==
- I Wouldn't Be in Your Shoes at the AFI Catalog of Feature Films.
- I Wouldn't Be In Your Shoes at IMDb
- I Wouldn't Be in Your Shoes at the TCM Movie Database (archived)
