= Deadline at Dawn (novel) =

1944 book by William Irish

- First edition
- Author: Cornell Woolrich
- Cover artist: P. K. Jackson
- Language: English
- Publisher: Lippincott
- Publication date: 1944
- Publication place: United States
- ISBN: 978-1613163276
- OCLC: 1285774848

Deadline at Dawn is a 1944 novel by American crime writer Cornell Woolrich under the pseudonym William Irish. It was adapted into a film of the same name in 1946 starring Susan Hayward.

Deadline at Dawn was also published as an Armed Services Edition.

== Plot ==
The story follows "Bricky", a hardened ten-cents-a-dance-girl who is disillusioned with life in New York City but is too scared to admit failure and return to her small-town home in Iowa. One night she meets Quinn, a troubled young patron who Bricky lets walk her home. They discover that they both come from the same town and the two quickly bond. He then admits he also secretly longs to return, but can't until his conscience is clear from some money he stole from the safe of a former client. They make a pact to leave together on the dawn bus after they have returned the money. However, on re-entering the man's home, they discover he has been murdered. They have until dawn to track down the killer before the police are called and Quinn will be blamed for the crime.

== Adaptations ==
The novel was adapted in 1946 into a RKO Pictures movie directed by Harold Clurman in his only on-screen directing credit. However, the film made many changes from its original source material, including changing the names of both lead characters and the identity of the murderer.

On May 15, 1948, it was broadcast as a Suspense radio drama, the last in the show's one-hour format.
