= I Wouldn't Be in Your Shoes (novel) =

Novellas by American crime writer Cornell Woolrich (1943)

- First edition cover
- Author: Cornell Woolrich (as William Irish)
- Language: English
- Publisher: Lippincott
- Publication date: 1943
- Publication place: United States

I Wouldn't Be in Your Shoes is a 1943 collection of five novellas by American crime writer Cornell Woolrich under the pseudonym "William Irish". It includes one of Woolrich's most noted works, Nightmare.

== Story summaries ==
- "I Wouldn't Be in Your Shoes" – On a hot night, Tom Quinn, frustrated by the wailing of the neighborhood cats in the lot behind his apartment building, throws his shoes out of the window at them. His wife makes him go out to find the shoes, but they appeared to have vanished in the darkness. The next day the shoes have been returned – after being worn by a murderer at the scene of his crime.
- "Last Night" – a woman suspects her husband of killing their wealthy guest after he refused to lend them money the night before.
- "Three O'Clock" – A man falls victim to his own insanity after finding himself bound and gagged in his cellar, next to the ticking bomb he set to kill his wife at three o'clock.
- "Nightmare" – After waking from a scarily vivid nightmare where he murdered a man in a strange mirrored room, Vince notices that strange details from his dream are real. A scratch on his wrist, a strange old key, in his pocket - if they are real, then could the murder be too?
- "Papa Benjamin" – In the French Quarter of New Orleans, struggling nightclub performer Eddie Bloch decides dabbling in voodoo might help save his failing act.

== Adaptations ==
"Papa Benjamin", "Last Night" and "Three O'Clock" were all adapted for the radio drama Escape.

"I Wouldn't Be in Your Shoes" was made into a film of the same name in 1948. "Nightmare" was adapted for screen in 1947 as Fear in the Night starring DeForest Kelley in his debut role, and then again in 1956 under its original title.
