= Somebody on the Phone =

- First edition cover
- Author: Cornell Woolrich (as William Irish)
- Language: English
- Publisher: J. B. Lippincott & Co.
- Publication date: 1950
- Publication place: United States

Somebody on the Phone is a 1950 short story collection by American crime writer Cornell Woolrich under the pseudonym William Irish. It consists of eight short stories, all of which had been published in various detective pulp magazines between 1934 and 1940. A paperback edition, issued in 1954 under the title Deadly Night Call) omitted two of the stories in the original hardcover edition.

== Story list ==
- Johnny on the Spot
- Somebody on the Phone [retitled Deadly Night Call in the paperback edition]
- Collared [omitted from the paperback edition]
- The Night I Died [omitted from the paperback edition]
- Momentum
- Boy with Body
- Death Sits in the Dentist's Chair
- The Room with Something Wrong
