= If I Should Die Before I Wake =

1946 short story collection by Cornell Woolrich

- First edition
- Author: Cornell Woolrich (as William Irish)
- Language: English
- Publisher: Avon Book Company
- Publication date: 1946
- Publication place: United States

If I Should Die Before I Wake is a 1946 short story collection by American crime writer Cornell Woolrich under his pseudonym, "William Irish". It contains six short stories. One of the short stories, "If I Should Die Before I Wake", was adapted as a film noir in 1952 in Argentina with the title, Si muero antes de despertar.

== Story list ==
- "If I Should Die Before I Wake"
- "I'll Never Play Detective Again"
- "Change of Murder"
- "A Death is Caused"
- "Two Murders, One Crime"
- "The Man Upstairs"
