= Dead Man Blues =

1948 short story collection by Cornell Woolrich

- First edition cover
- Author: Cornell Woolrich (as William Irish)
- Language: English
- Published: 1948
- Publisher: Lippincott
- Publication place: United States

Dead Man Blues is a 1948 short story collection by American crime writer Cornell Woolrich under the pseudonym William Irish. It comprises seven short stories. An abridged 1947 edition was published by Lawrence Spivak/The American Mercury the previous year.

== Story list ==
- Guillotine - On his last walk to the guillotine, a killer reminisces about the chain of events that lead him to his death.
- The Ear-Ring - A blackmailed woman is forced to return to her tormentor's home hoping to find her lost earring before he does and uses it as more ammunition against her. Unwittingly, she returns to witness his murder.
- If the Dead Could Talk - A deadly love triangle forms between three flying trapeze performers.
- Fire-Escape - On a stifling hot night in New York City, twelve year old Buddy decides to sleep out on the fire escape. Through the window of the apartment above, he witnesses a brutal murder – only nobody will believe him. Except the killers upstairs.
- Fountain Pen
- You Take Ballistics
- Funeral

== Adaptations ==
"Fire-Escape" was adapted into the film The Window in 1949, and again in 1984 in the loosely-based Cloak & Dagger.

If the Dead Could Talk was broadcast as an episode of the Suspense radio show on January 20, 1949. You Take Ballistics was also adapted for the same show in March 1947.

Fountain Pen was adapted into Kihachi Okamoto's film "Oh Bomb" (1964)
