= After-Dinner Story =

1944 short story collection by Cornell Woolrich

- First edition cover
- Author: Cornell Woolrich (as William Irish)
- Language: English
- Publisher: Lippincott
- Publication date: 1944
- Publication place: United States

After-Dinner Story is a 1944 short story collection by American crime writer Cornell Woolrich under the pseudonym William Irish. It comprises six stories, and includes two of Woolrich's best known works, novella Marihuana and "Rear Window" (originally published in Dime Detective Magazine under the title "It Had to Be Murder"), which was made into a film by Alfred Hitchcock in 1954.

== Story Summaries ==
- "After-Dinner Story" – Six men were trapped in an elevator after a terrifying accident. But that can't explain how, by the time they are rescued, one of them has been shot to death. The death is labelled as a suicide until, a year later, the murdered man's father invites the survivors of the accident together to tell them "an after dinner story".
- "The Night Reveals" – An insurance agent suspects his wife of being a dangerous pyromaniac behind a recent spree of deadly housefires. But how can he be sure, and how can he stop her?
- "An Apple a Day" – This story centres around a criminal who after desperately stealing ten thousand dollars unwittingly throws away five times that sum with the toss of an apple.
- Marihuana – Depressed after breaking up with his wife Eleanor, King Turner is pressured into trying marijuana for the first time by his friends. Under the influence, he turns into a psychotic spree killer and starts a night of rampage on the city.
- "Rear Window" – After breaking his leg, Hal Jeffries has nothing better to do than sit at the window and observe his neighbours in the apartment building across the way. Soon he starts to realise something isn't quite right in one of the apartments – can he really be witnessing the aftermath of a murder?
- "Murder-Story" – A writer becomes a prime suspect in a murder case, especially after the police discover one of his unpublished stories almost exactly recounts what must have happened the night of the crime.

== Adaptations ==
"After-Dinner Story" and "The Night Reveals" were both adapted for the Suspense radio show in October and March 1943 respectively.

"Rear Window" was adapted into the highly acclaimed 1954 movie by director Alfred Hitchcock and starred James Stewart and Grace Kelly. A television adaptation of "Rear Window" was also released in 1998.

== Publication history ==
After-Dinner Story was first published in the United States in 1944 by Lippincott. It was reprinted in paperback in 1948 under the title "Six Times Death."
