= Deadline at Dawn =

1946 film by Harold Clurman

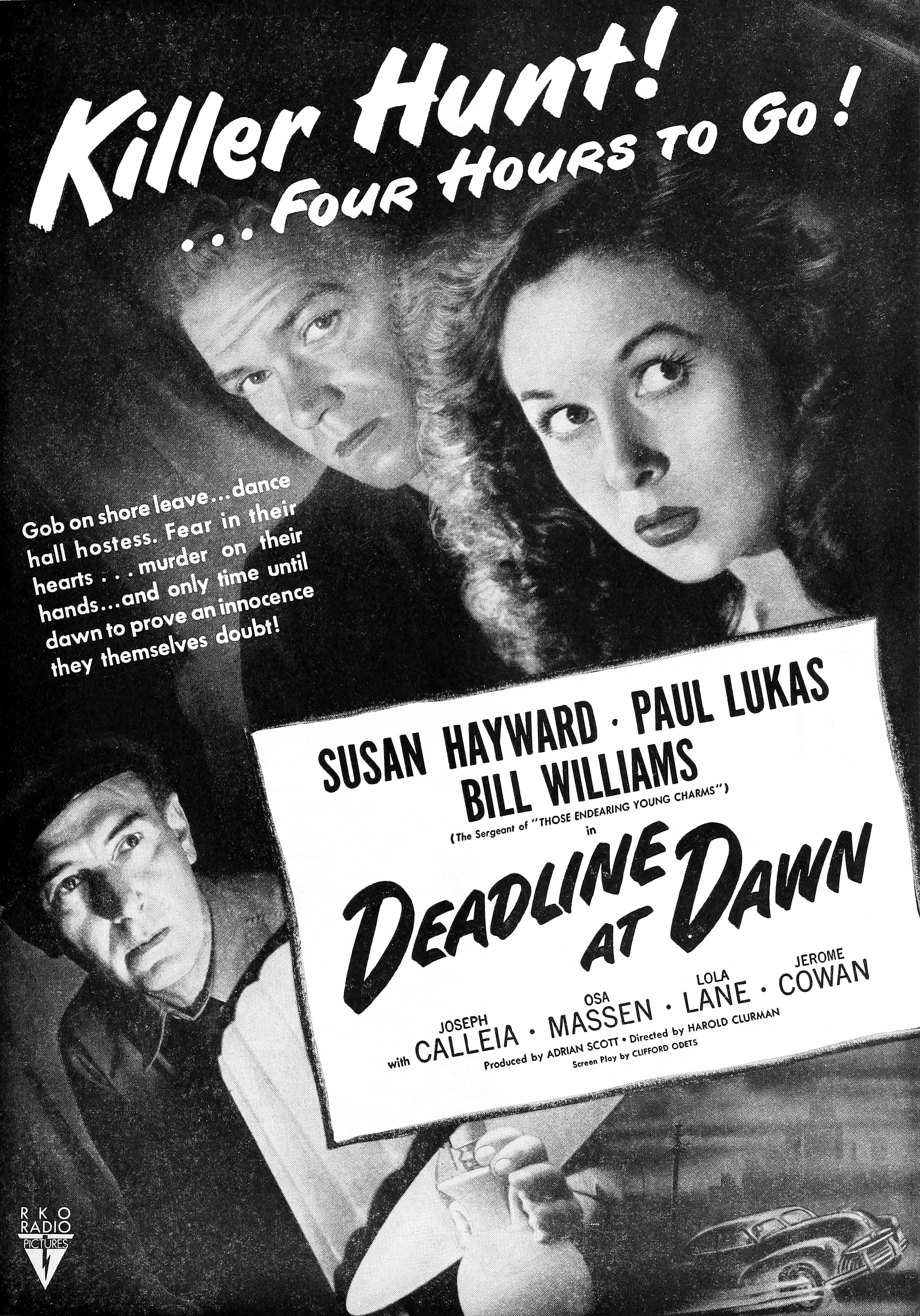
- Magazine advertisement
- Directed by: Harold Clurman
- Screenplay by: Clifford Odets
- Based on: Deadline at Dawn by "William Irish"
- Produced by: Adrian Scott
- Starring: Susan Hayward; Paul Lukas; Bill Williams
- Cinematography: Nicholas Musuraca
- Edited by: Roland Gross
- Music by: Hanns Eisler; C. Bakaleinikoff
- Distributed by: RKO Pictures
- Release dates: March 18, 1946 (Sweden); April 3, 1946 (United States)
- Running time: 83 minutes
- Country: United States
- Language: English

Deadline at Dawn is a 1946 American film noir, the only film directed by stage director Harold Clurman. It was written by Clifford Odets and based on the 1944 novel of the same name by Cornell Woolrich (as William Irish). The RKO Pictures film release was the only cinematic collaboration between Clurman and his former Group Theatre associate, screenwriter Odets. The director of photography was RKO regular Nicholas Musuraca. The musical score was by German refugee composer Hanns Eisler.

== Plot ==
Sleepy Parsons, a blind piano player, arrives at the apartment of his ex-wife Edna Bartelli, who owes him $1,400 (equivalent to $23,114 in 2025). She checks her purse, but discovers it is missing. She immediately believes a U.S. Navy sailor has it. Nearby a newsstand in New York City, Alex Winkley wakes up with a hazy memory having been drinking the night before, and discovers the cash in his pocket. With seven hours left before he departs for duty, Alex approaches June Goffe, a dance hall girl, at a night club. They dance, and she brings Alex to her apartment.

Before he leaves June's apartment, Alex learns June's mother lives in Norfolk, Virginia, which is nearby a naval base where Alex is stationed. He hands her some of the money to support her, explaining he had stolen it after fixing Edna's radio at her apartment. June convinces Alex to return the money, only for him to discover that Edna is dead.

There, June suspects Alex of having murdered Edna, but he claims his innocence. Outside the apartment, Babe Dooley, one of Edna's past lovers, cries out for her until he leaves. They suspect a man had killed Edna by strangulation, and although June is at first reluctant, she and Alex decide to retrace the killer's steps. They learn hours ago, a blonde woman with a limp had rushed into a cab. June learns from a cab driver he had driven the blonde downtown, while Alex follows a distraught man. Alex eventually learns that the man raced off because his cat was choking and orders his taxi back to Edna's.

June arrives at the apartment of Helen Robinson and her husband Jerry. Helen has an argument with her husband, and steps out where June interrogates Helen about her whereabouts the night before. Alex and June arrive back at Edna's apartment, while Gus Hoffman, a taxi driver concerned about Alex, follows him. They involve Gus in the investigation, and locate Edna's letters intending to blackmail multiple past lovers and a bad check signed by Lester Brady.

A woman known as Mrs. Raymond walks into Edna's apartment, where she is immediately startled to learn that Edna is dead. Alex, June, and Gus reveal themselves and Mrs. Raymond runs out of the apartment. Alex calls Lester notifying him of Edna's murder, and Mrs. Raymond, having arrived at Lester's apartment, suspects Alex of the murder.

Alex arrives at Lester's apartment, where he is confronted by Edna's brother Val, who suspects Alex of the murder. The three men go to Edna's apartment. Enraged at his sister's murder, Val assaults Alex until Lester convinces him to stop him. June and Gus return to the apartment, and using a white carnation as a clue, they drive down to a nightclub where Sleepy Parsons is performing. Wearing Edna's perfume, June informs Sleepy of the murder. Val inquires Sleepy with questions, and Sleepy dies from a fatal heart attack. The police are soon involved and Alex is interrogated for Edna's murder.

However, Jerry Robinson confesses to killing Edna, but his testimony is disproven. Gus suddenly confesses to killing Edna, having wanted to protect his daughter Helen's marriage. Jerry had been romantically involved with Edna, who gave birth to his child. On the night of the murder, Gus confronted Edna, and in a fit of rage, he strangled her. Gus pleads for Alex's release and he is booked for homicide. Before Alex departs for naval duty, he shares a kiss with June.

== Cast ==
- Susan Hayward as June Goffe
- Paul Lukas as Gus Hoffman
- Bill Williams as Alex Winkley
- Joseph Calleia as Val Bartelli
- Osa Massen as Helen Robinson
- Lola Lane as Edna Bartelli
- Jerome Cowan as Lester Brady
- Marvin Miller as Sleepy Parsons
- Roman Bohnen as Frantic Man with Injured Cat
- Steven Geray as Edward Hornick
- Joe Sawyer as Babe Dooley
- Constance Worth as Mrs. Nan Raymond
- Joseph Crehan as Lt. Kane
- Byron Foulger as Night Attendant (uncredited)
- Eugene Pallette as Man In Crowd (uncredited)
- Al Bridge as Smiley (uncredited)
- Jason Robards Sr. as Policeman (uncredited)

== Production ==
Richard Fleischer says that Sid Rogell, head of RKO's B Picture unit, bullied Harold Clurman during production meetings, saying he would "kick the director right in the balls". He says Clurman accepted it without complaint.

A significant portion of the film is alleged to have been directed by William Cameron Menzies, who refused credit as he didn't like Clurman and did not want his name to be associated with Clurman's in any way.

The dialogue contains Odets' trademark New York wisecracks. For example, while dancing at club early in the movie, the Hayward character likens the dance hall to a post office, filled with second-class matter. Edna Bartelli greets her ex-husband by saying, "Aren't you dead yet?"

There are many "slice of life" characterizations of big city people in small roles, such as a tired banana salesman, an angry building superintendent, a refugee with a skin condition who has a crush on June, and a wisecracking sidewalk pitchman.

Odets' Group Theatre colleague Roman Bohnen appears in a bit part, as a grief-stricken man with a dying cat.

== Reception ==
=== Critical response ===
The Brooklyn Eagle was approving: “a tightly stitched package of melodramatic suspense. Though adapted from a novel by William Irish, ‘Deadline at Dawn’ is tailor made for the screen....’Deadline at Dawn’ picks up momentum as it moves along toward the sailor's bus time. But it never resorts to the usual mystery of melodrama. Nor does it pull too far from the reasonable. It is a cleverly written play....[Hayward, Williams, and Lukas] all of them performing easily, credibly, and with deep understanding of the Odets characters....It isn't likely you'll spot the killer in ‘Deadline at Dawn.’ Even if nothing else counts in melodrama, that's pretty good proof that it's good. ‘Deadline at Dawn’ is actually better than good.” Writing in The Nation in 1946, critic James Agee stated, "Some of Clurman's direction is pure stage—some of which comes through very well; some of Odets's writing is pure ham ... But on the whole I think it is a likable movie. Odets apparently cannot either separate his weakness and strength or greatly change their proportions, but even in this rather pretentiously unpretentious little job that strength is there ... And his good bits, to say nothing of his bad, are handled competently by Susan Hayward, disarmingly by Bill Williams, and beautifully by Paul Lukas."

Film critic Dennis Schwartz somewhat liked the film, writing in 2004: "Broadway's Harold Clurman takes his only stab at film directing, after the breakup of his Group Theatre, in this odd psychological thriller noted for its flowery dialogue and muddled story line ... It's penned by playwright Clifford Odets from a story by Cornell Woolrich. Though enjoyable by virtue of its distorted mise-en-scène, affection for NYC characters and its misplaced chatter, this is not art but run-of-the-mill film noir. Set in Manhattan, yet Deadline used no location shots but was filmed entirely in the studio's back lots. Cinematographer Nick Musuraca does a fine job creating an atmospheric scene of NYC's downtrodden and unhappy souls roaming the dark streets."

== Home media ==
Warner Bros. released the film on DVD on July 13, 2010, in its Film Noir Classic Collection, Vol. 5.
