= Rear Window =

1954 film by Alfred Hitchcock

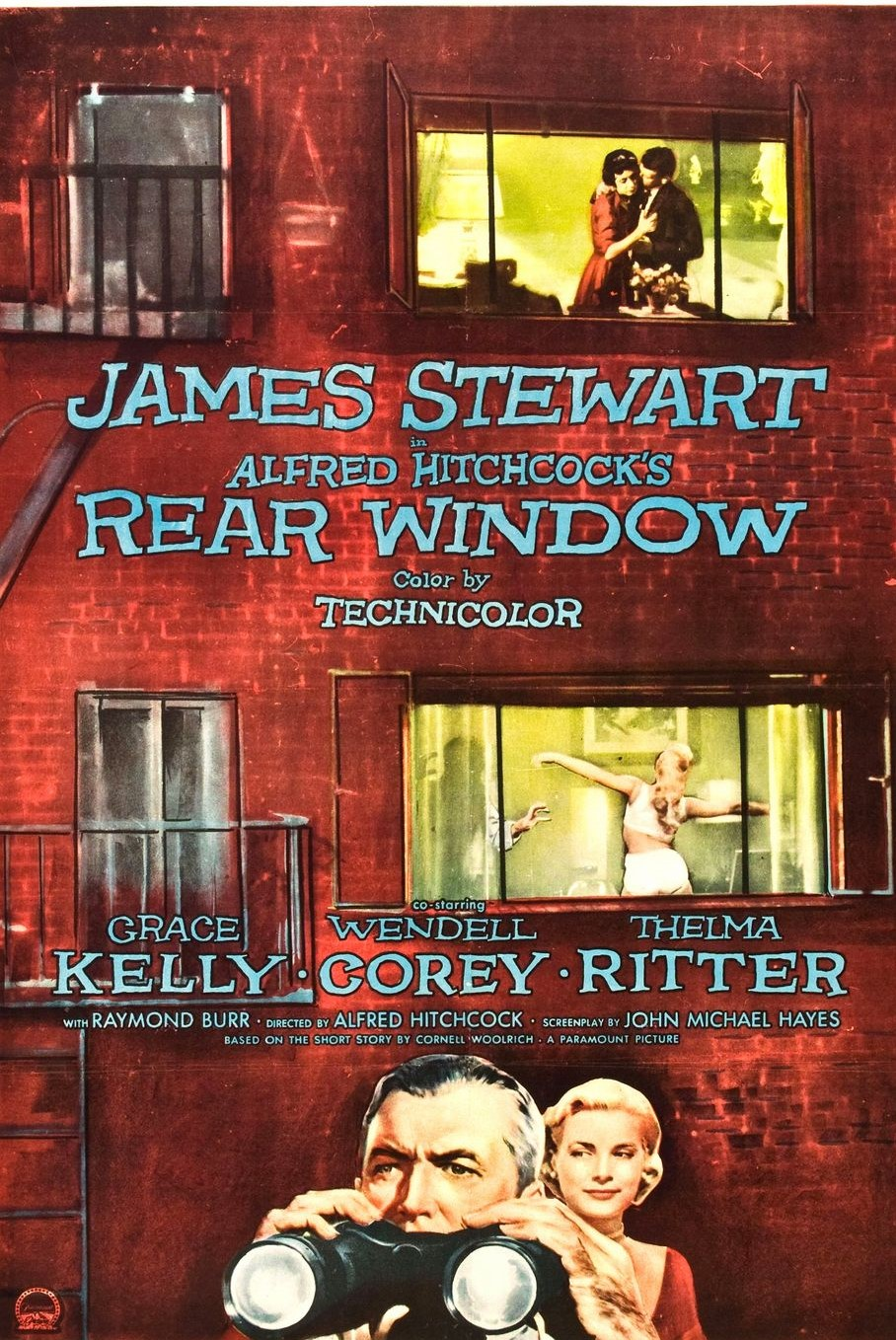
- Theatrical release poster
- Directed by: Alfred Hitchcock
- Screenplay by: John Michael Hayes
- Based on: "It Had to Be Murder"; 1942 story in Dime Detective by Cornell Woolrich
- Produced by: Alfred Hitchcock
- Starring: James Stewart; Grace Kelly; Wendell Corey; Thelma Ritter; Raymond Burr
- Cinematography: Robert Burks
- Edited by: George Tomasini
- Music by: Franz Waxman
- Production companies: Patron Inc. Avernus Productions
- Distributed by: Paramount Pictures (Note: After the film's release, Paramount transferred the distribution rights to Hitchcock's estate, where they were acquired by Universal Pictures in 1983.)
- Release dates: August 4, 1954 (New York City); September 1, 1954 (United States)
- Running time: 112 minutes
- Country: United States
- Language: English
- Budget: $1 million
- Box office: $37.9 million

Rear Window is a 1954 American mystery thriller film produced and directed by Alfred Hitchcock and written by John Michael Hayes, based on Cornell Woolrich's 1942 short story "It Had to Be Murder". Originally released by Paramount Pictures, the film stars James Stewart, Grace Kelly, Wendell Corey, Thelma Ritter, and Raymond Burr. It was screened at the 1954 Venice Film Festival in competition for the Golden Lion.

Rear Window is shot almost entirely from within one room and from the point-of-view outside the window. The film was made with a budget of $1 million ($12 million in 2025), and grossed $27 million during its initial release ($324 million in 2025).

Rear Window is considered by many filmgoers, critics, and scholars to be one of Hitchcock's best films, as well as one of the greatest films ever made. It received four Academy Award nominations, and was ranked number 42 on AFI's 100 Years...100 Movies list and number 48 on the 10th-anniversary edition, and in 1997 was selected for preservation in the United States National Film Registry in the Library of Congress as being "culturally, historically, or aesthetically significant."

== Plot ==
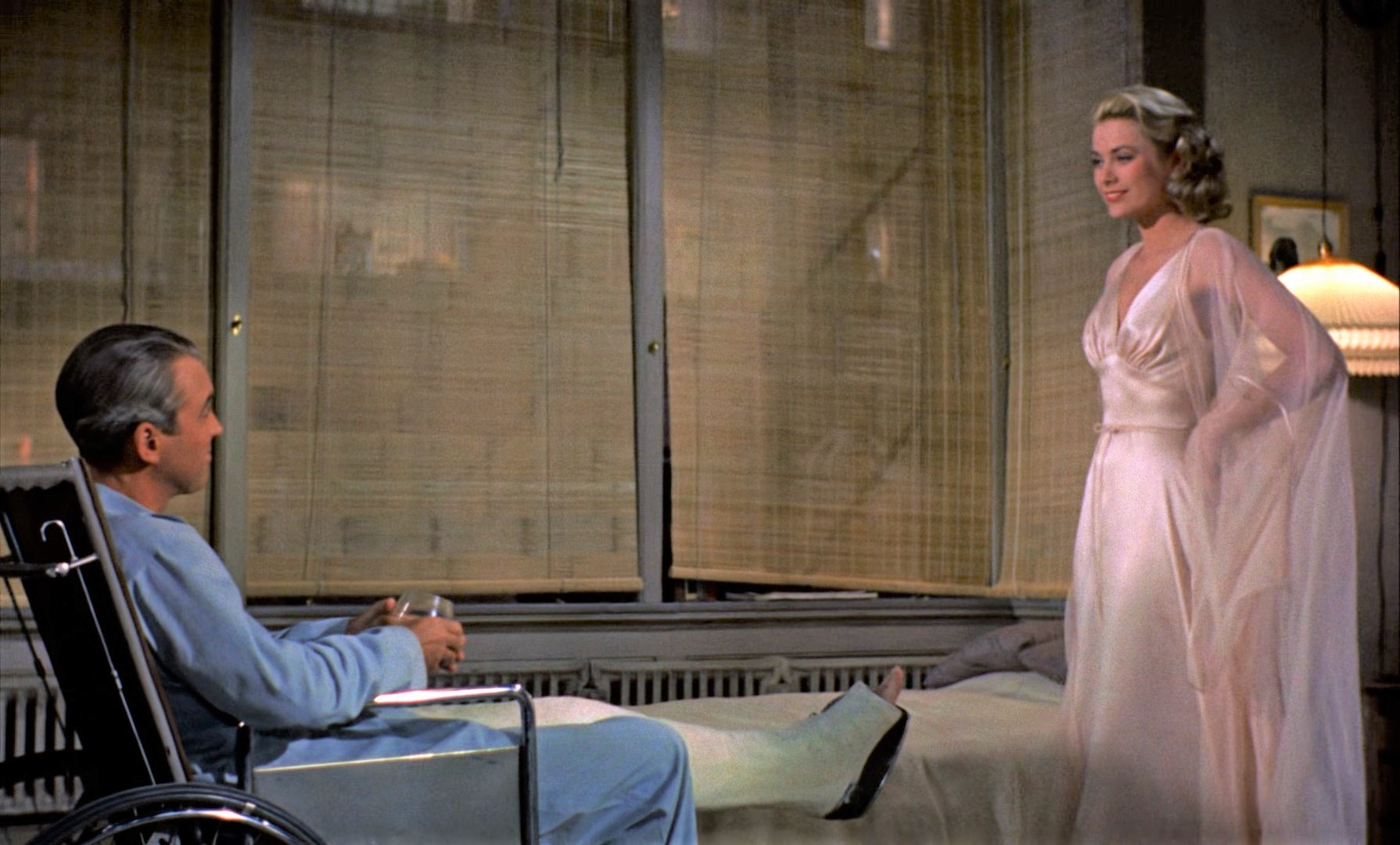
James Stewart and Grace Kelly

In the mid-1950s, photojournalist L. B. "Jeff" Jefferies, recuperating from assignment-related injuries, in a cast from his hip to his foot, is wheelchair-bound in his Greenwich Village apartment. His mid-floor rear window looks onto a courtyard with small garden plots, surrounded on four sides by apartments in adjoining buildings. Jeff is regularly visited by Stella, a nurse, and his couture-clad girlfriend, Lisa Fremont, a model and socialite. Jeff and Lisa disagree about whether their relationship can survive different lifestyles.

During a heat wave, Jeff watches his neighbors through open windows, including a newlywed couple; a professional dancer coined "Miss Torso"; a songwriter with writer's block; a spinster who pantomimes dates with pretend suitors, "Miss Lonely-Hearts"; and traveling costume jewelry salesman Lars Thorwald, henpecked by his bedridden wife. One night, Jeff hears a woman scream, followed by the sound of breaking glass. Later that night, he observes Thorwald making repeated excursions carrying his sample case. After Jeff has fallen asleep, Thorwald leaves his apartment along with a woman.

The next morning, Jeff notices that Thorwald's wife seems to be gone, and Thorwald is cleaning a large knife and a handsaw. Movers haul away a large trunk. After surveilling with binoculars and a camera's telephoto lens, Jeff grows suspicious of Thorwald's activities. Convinced Thorwald has murdered his wife, he first tells Stella, who becomes morbidly interested in the case, and then Lisa, who doubts him until they notice that Thorwald's wife is no longer in bed and the mattress is rolled up.

Jeff calls his friend, detective Tom Doyle, to request that he investigate Thorwald. A skeptical Doyle investigates, finds nothing suspicious, and posits that Thorwald sent his wife on a vacation upstate. Jeff and Lisa are temporarily mollified by this explanation. Later that night, however, a neighbor's dog is found dead in the courtyard; the previous day, Thorwald had chased the dog away from digging his garden flowerbed. The dog's alarmed owner cries out, drawing the attention of everyone except Thorwald, who sits furtively in his dark apartment. Now convinced his theory is true, Jeff looks at slides taken two weeks earlier and notices that Thorwald has replanted flowers in his garden, possibly to bury a body part.

The following night, Jeff telephones to lure Thorwald away from his apartment, enabling Lisa and Stella to investigate Thorwald's flowerbed. Finding nothing, Lisa climbs into Thorwald's open window to search his apartment. Stella hurries back to Jeff.

While Lisa is searching, Jeff and Stella are distracted watching Miss Lonely-Hearts contemplating an overdose. Returning unexpectedly, Thorwald catches and attacks Lisa, causing Lisa to cry out. Jeff calls the police to report a man assaulting a woman at Thorwald's apartment. The police arrive to intervene as Lisa and Thorwald scuffle. During police questioning, Lisa signals to Jeff that she is wearing Mrs. Thorwald's wedding ring. Seeing this, Thorwald realizes Jeff is surveilling his apartment. Lacking proof to accuse Thorwald of murder, Lisa allows herself to be arrested for breaking and entering to be taken away safely. Coincidentally, the songwriter had finished his song "Lisa", playing loudly; enthralled by the tune, Miss Lonely-Hearts abandons her suicide attempt.

Jeff phones Doyle, leaving an urgent message, while Stella bails Lisa out of jail. Locating Jeff's apartment, Thorwald attacks him; Jeff's only defense in a darkened apartment is snapping his camera flash bulbs in Thorwald's eyes. While they grapple, Doyle and police officers arrive, followed by Lisa and Stella. Police apprehend Thorwald just as he drops Jeff out of his window. Thorwald confesses to his wife's murder, dumping her remains in the East River, and relocating a hat box containing her head after the dog tried to dig it up.

Days later, the heat wave has broken, and life in the apartment complex has returned to normal. Miss Lonely-Hearts is socializing with the songwriter in his studio apartment while he plays piano; Thorwald's neighbors get a new puppy; Miss Torso's unprepossessing boyfriend returns from army deployment, and the newlyweds are more aloof. Having broken his other leg in the fall, Jeff remains wheelchair-bound, now with both legs in casts. As he naps, Lisa, in casual attire, surreptitiously switches from reading a book on travel exploration to a fashion magazine.

== Cast ==
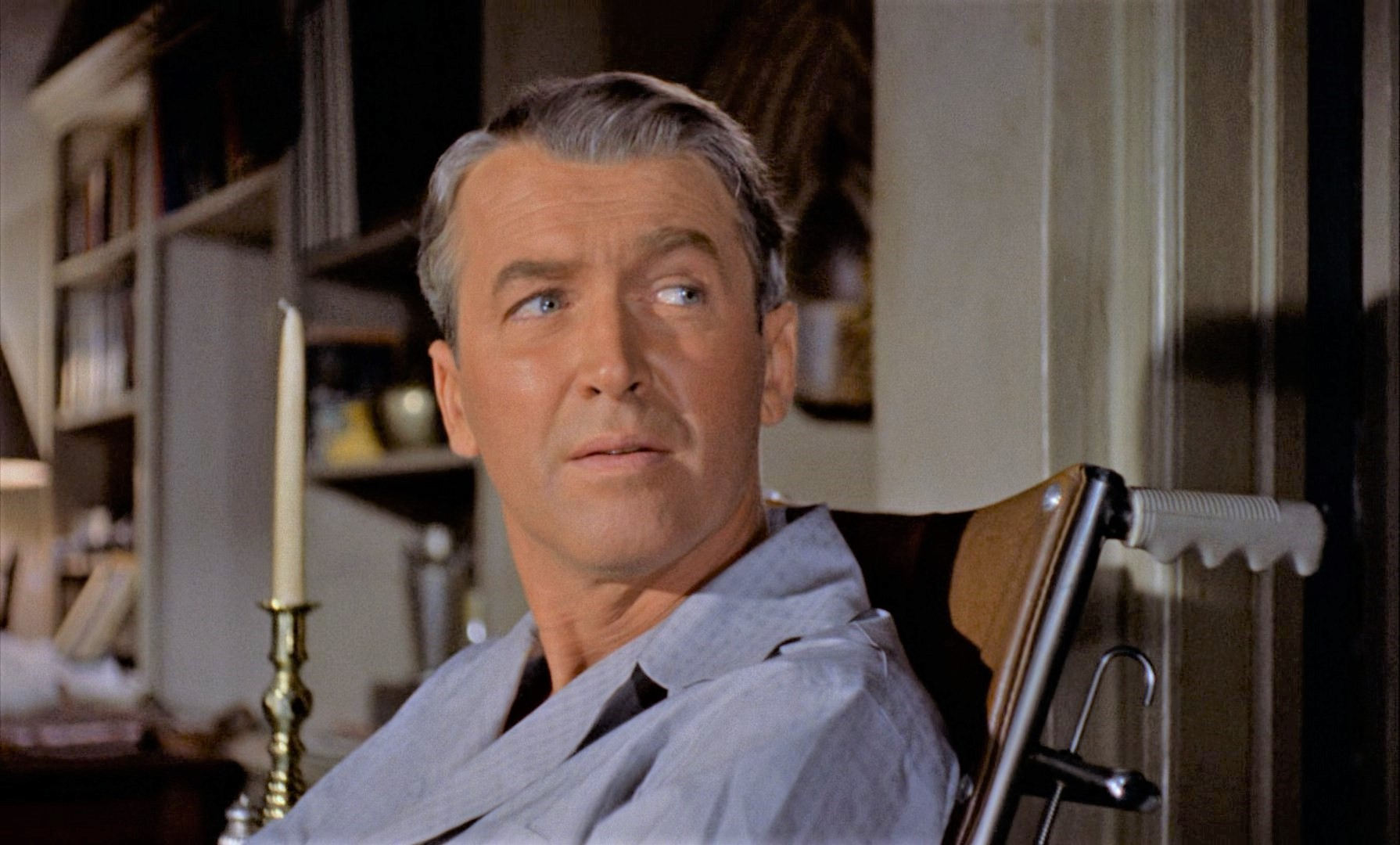
James Stewart as L. B. Jefferies, who watches his neighbors out of boredom while at home with a broken leg.

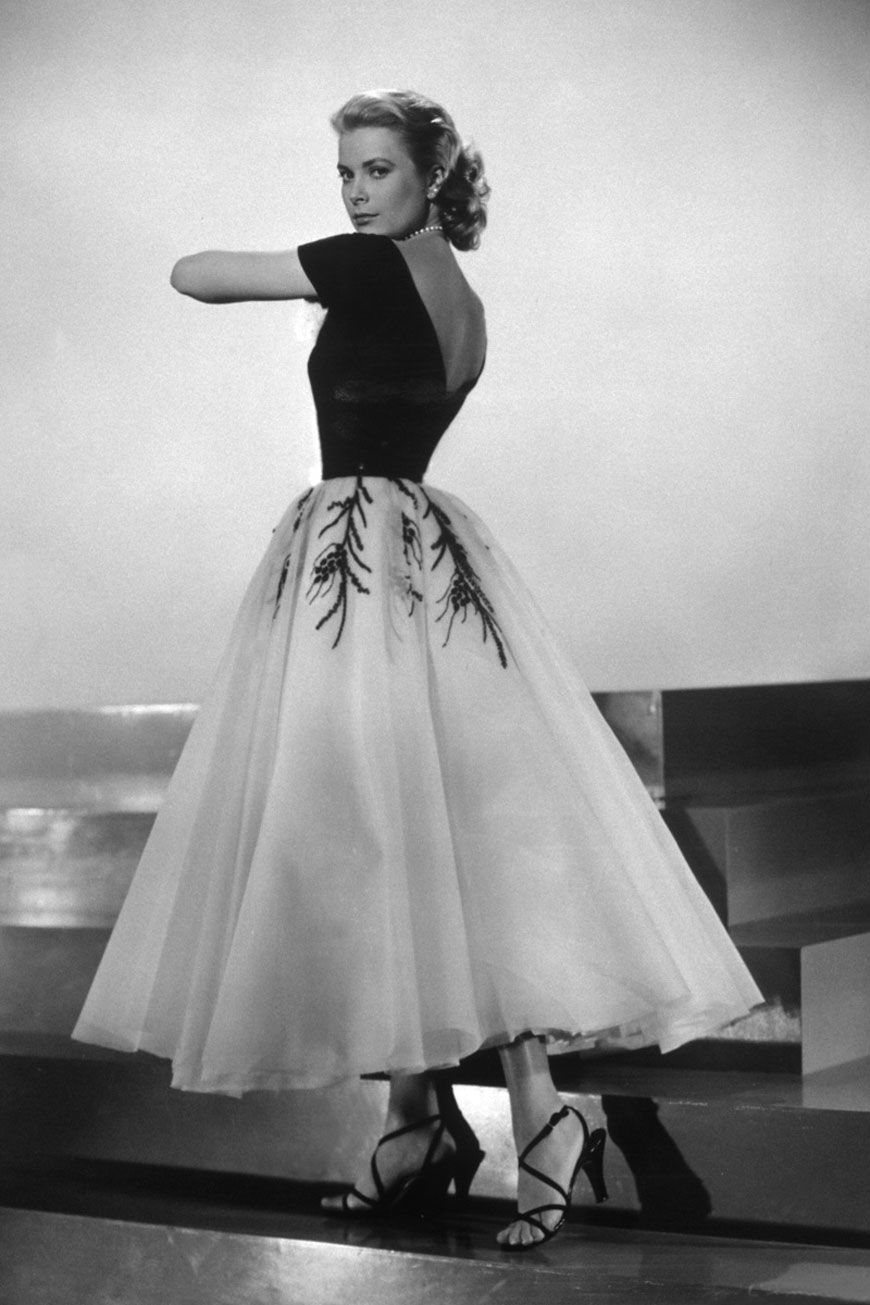
Grace Kelly as Lisa Fremont, in a couture gown, whom Jeff cannot imagine "roughing it" in casual clothes.

- James Stewart as L. B. "Jeff" Jefferies, a photojournalist
- Grace Kelly as Lisa Fremont, a model
- Wendell Corey as Lt. Thomas "Tom" J. Doyle, an NYPD detective
- Thelma Ritter as Stella, a nurse
- Raymond Burr as Lars Thorwald
- Judith Evelyn as "Miss Lonely-Hearts"
- Ross Bagdasarian as the songwriter
- Georgine Darcy as "Miss Torso"
- Sara Berner and Frank Cady as the couple living above the Thorwalds
- Jesslyn Fax as "Miss Hearing Aid", the sculptress
- Rand Harper and Havis Davenport as the newlyweds
- Irene Winston as Mrs. Anna Thorwald

Uncredited

- Harry Landers as young man guest of Miss Lonely-Hearts
- Ralph Smiles as Carl, the waiter
- Fred Graham as detective 1
- Eddie Parker as detective 2
- Anthony Warde as detective 3
- Kathryn Grant as girl at songwriter's party
- Marla English as girl at songwriter's party
- Bess Flowers as woman at songwriter's party with poodle
- Benny Bartlett as Stanley, Miss Torso's returning boyfriend
- Dick Simmons as man with Miss Torso

Cast notes

- Director Alfred Hitchcock makes his traditional cameo appearance in the songwriter's apartment, where he is seen winding a clock.

== Themes ==
=== Point of view ===
Rear Window is filmed almost entirely within Jeff's apartment and from his near-static point-of-view at his window. Hitchcock himself has described the film as "purely subjective treatment." Some authors such as Lawrence Howe have argued that this is an overstatement: the opening pans of the courtyard and Jeff's apartment take place while Jeff is sleeping, and at two points in the film, the discovery of the neighbors' dead dog and the climax, the camera leaves Jeff's apartment and moves around the courtyard, showing the neighbors from outside Jeff's perspective.

=== Voyeurism and being watched ===
In his 1954 review of the film, François Truffaut suggested "this parable: The courtyard is the world, the reporter/photographer is the filmmaker, the binoculars stand for the camera and its lenses."

John Fawell notes in Dennis Perry's book Hitchcock and Poe: The Legacy of Delight and Terror that Hitchcock "recognized that the darkest aspect of voyeurism ... is our desire for awful things to happen to people ... to make ourselves feel better, and to relieve ourselves of the burden of examining our own lives." Hitchcock challenges the audience, forcing them to peer through his rear window and become exposed to, as Donald Spoto calls it in his 1976 book The Art of Alfred Hitchcock: Fifty Years of His Motion Pictures, the "social contagion" of acting as voyeur.

In his book Alfred Hitchcock's "Rear Window", John Belton further addresses the underlying issues of voyeurism which he asserts are evident in the film. He says "Rear Window's story is 'about' spectacle; it explores the fascination with looking and the attraction of that which is being looked at."

Lawrence Howe argues the film is as much about the fear of being seen as it is watching. Jeff keeps himself in the position of an observer throughout the movie, and Thorwald's returned look threatens to turn him from the one looking to the one who's looked at.

In an explicit example of a condemnation of voyeurism, Stella expresses her outrage at Jeff's voyeuristic habits, saying, "In the old days, they'd put your eyes out with a red hot poker" and "What people ought to do is get outside their own house and look in for a change." Howe states that Jeff's fall from his window is the point where this happens: Thorwald forces Jeff out of his protected position as an observer, and he becomes the spectacle which his neighbors are looking at for the first time. Howe argues that this finally allows Jeff enter a reciprocal relationship with Lisa.

Robin Wood in his 1989 book Hitchcock's Films Revisited describes Jeff's development over the course of the film as closely tied with voyeurism, in terms of "the indulging of morbid curiosity and the consequences of that indulgence."

Additionally, Howe reads Hitchcock's cameo, in which he winds a clock in the songwriter's apartment and turns to look back, as an acknowledgment that the audience is being watched as well.

=== Gender and the gaze ===
In Laura Mulvey's essay "Visual Pleasure and Narrative Cinema," she identifies what she sees as voyeurism and scopophilia in Hitchcock's movies, with Rear Window used as one example of how she sees cinema as incorporating the patriarchy into the way that pleasure is constructed and signaled to the audience. Additionally, she sees the "male gaze" as especially evident in Rear Window in the portrayal of characters such as the dancer "Miss Torso", who is a spectacle for both Jeff and the audience (through his substitution) to enjoy.

Later scholars have challenged Mulvey's views, including those of characters such as Lisa. In The Women Who Knew Too Much (1988), Tania Modleski argues that Lisa is active and powerful rather than a "passive image" like Mulvey suggests. She also argues that the film increasingly shows a dual point of view, with Lisa as an observer alongside Jeff, acting as a model of the female spectator who relates to, and shows empathy for the neighbors across the courtyard in contrast to Jeff's detached view.

== Production ==
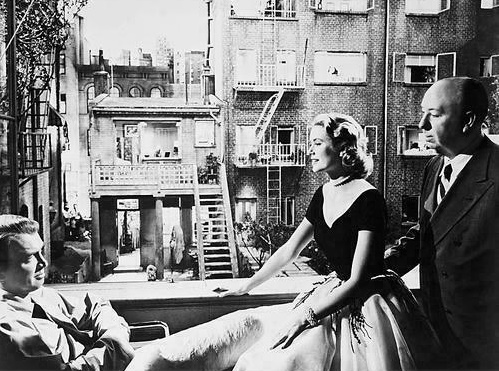
Stewart, Kelly, and Hitchcock on set

=== Writing ===
The screenplay, which was written by John Michael Hayes, was based on Cornell Woolrich's 1942 short story It Had to Be Murder. Hitchcock hired Hayes in 1953 to turn Woolrich's short story into a screenplay. Hayes made several changes to the original story, including making Jeff a traveling photographer. This helped explain how Jeff broke his leg and gave more background to his character. Hitchcock and Hayes also added Jeff's relationship with Lisa, which was not part of the original story.

Hayes developed Lisa's character with Grace Kelly in mind, using parts of her personality and his wife's career as inspiration. Hitchcock and Hayes continued making changes to the screenplay before filming began. One of these changes involved removing an earlier subplot about an unfaithful husband and changing the story involving the couple whose dog was killed.

Before filming began, Hitchcock worked through the screenplay with Hayes to plan how each scene would be filmed. Hitchcock drew sketches showing the camera angles and put them together into storyboards. The camera crew and editors used these drawings to help plan their work. The storyboards were also updated during filming when changes were made.

However, in 1990 the question as to who owned the film rights of Woolrich's original story went before the Supreme Court of the United States in Stewart v. Abend. Although the film was copyrighted in 1954 by Patron Inc., a production company set up by Hitchcock and Stewart, a subsequent rights holder refused to acknowledge previous rights agreements. As a result, Stewart and Hitchcock's estate became involved in the Supreme Court case. Its outcome led to the litigant, Sheldon Abend, becoming credited as a producer of the 1998 remake of Rear Window.

=== Filming ===
Most of the film was shot on Stage 18 at Paramount Studios which included an enormous indoor set to replicate a Greenwich Village courtyard, with the set stretching from the bottom of the basement storeroom to the top of the lighting grid in the ceiling. The lighting was rigged with four interchangeable scene lighting arrangements: morning, afternoon, evening, and night-time. Set designers Hal Pereira and Joseph MacMillan Johnson spent six weeks building the extremely detailed and complex set, which ended up being the largest of its kind at Paramount. Stage 18's tallest structure stood at a height of 40 ft (12 m), with a courtyard spanning 70 ft (21 m) across. The final set included 31 apartments with electricity and running water, and about 12 of the apartments had furniture for the film. One of the unique features of the set was its massive drainage system, constructed to accommodate the rain sequence in the film. They also built the set around a highly nuanced lighting system which was able to create natural-looking lighting effects for both the day and night scenes. Though the address given in the film is 125 W. Ninth Street in New York's Greenwich Village, the set was actually based on a real courtyard located at 125 Christopher Street.

Because most of the movie was filmed from Jeff's apartment, Hitchcock had to direct the actors across the courtyard from a distance. The actors wore small radio receivers so Hitchcock could give them instructions while staying behind the camera. This allowed him to coordinate what was happening in the different apartments during filming.

The famous uninterrupted 90 second scene at the beginning of the film in which the main character Jefferies and his neighborhood are introduced to the viewer was created with meticulous care. It required many rehearsals and ten takes during half a day of filming before it was completed. Meticulous details in the filming also include such effects as the opposite building seen reflected in Jefferies' camera lens.

Some scenes required special filming techniques. For the scene where Jeff falls from his apartment window, the crew filmed the courtyard and James Stewart's fall separately. Stewart's part was filmed on Paramount's Stage 3, where he hung from a window above mattresses covered in black fabric. The two shots were then combined to make it look like Jeff was falling into the courtyard.

In addition to the meticulous care and detail put into the set and filming, careful attention was also given to sound, including the use of natural sounds and music that would drift across the courtyard and into Jefferies' apartment. At one point, the voice of Bing Crosby can be heard singing "To See You Is to Love You," originally from the 1952 Paramount film Road to Bali. Also heard on the soundtrack are versions of songs popularized earlier in the decade by Nat King Cole ("Mona Lisa", 1950) and Dean Martin ("That's Amore", 1953), along with segments from Leonard Bernstein's score for Jerome Robbins' ballet Fancy Free (1944), Richard Rodgers's song "Lover" (1932), and "M'appari tutt'amor" from Friedrich von Flotow's opera Martha (1844), most borrowed from Paramount's music publisher, Famous Music.

Hitchcock used costume designer Edith Head on all of his Paramount films.

== Soundtrack ==
Although veteran Hollywood composer Franz Waxman is credited with the score for the film, his contributions were limited to the opening and closing titles and the songwriter's piano tune ("Lisa"). This was Waxman's final score for Hitchcock.

=== Use of diegetic sound ===
Hitchcock primarily used diegetic music and sounds throughout the film. In her 1982 book The Silent Scream: Alfred Hitchcock's Sound Track, Elisabeth Weiss notes that while much of the movie is spent peering into the windows of Jefferies' neighbors, the noise coming from that particular window only dominates in a small percentage of shots. To Weiss, the imbalance between audio and visual creates tension and irony. She also argues the isolated nature of the neighbors within the complex is countered by the use of diegetic audio.

John Fawell notes how the passive noise over the courtyard forces the neighbors to connect despite their usual lives keeping them locked away from each other.

== Release ==
Original trailer for the 1968 re-release of Rear Window (1954)

On August 4, 1954, a "benefit world premiere" was held for the film, with United Nations officials and "prominent members of the social and entertainment worlds" at the Rivoli Theatre in New York City, with proceeds going to the American–Korean Foundation (an aid organization founded soon after the end of the Korean War and headed by Milton S. Eisenhower, brother of President Eisenhower).

During its initial theatrical run, Rear Window earned $5.3 million in North American box office rentals.

== Reception ==
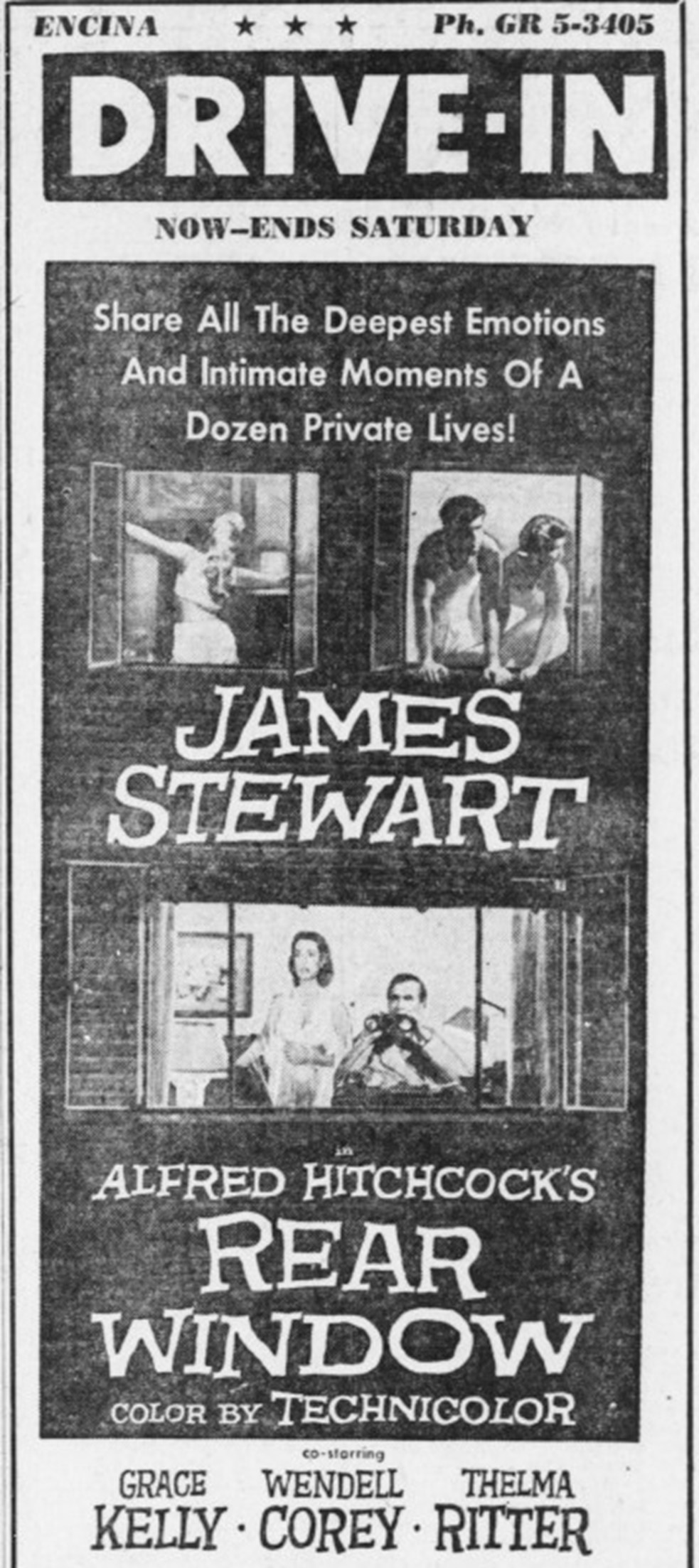
Drive-in advertisement from 1954

Bosley Crowther of The New York Times called the film a "tense and exciting exercise" and deemed Hitchcock as a director whose work has a "maximum of build-up to the punch, a maximum of carefully tricked deception and incidents to divert and amuse." Crowther also noted that "Mr. Hitchcock's film is not 'significant.' What it has to say about people and human nature is superficial and glib, but it does expose many facets of the loneliness of city life, and it tacitly demonstrates the impulse of morbid curiosity. The purpose of it is sensation, and that it generally provides in the colorfulness of its detail and in the flood of menace toward the end." Variety called the film "one of Alfred Hitchcock's better thrillers" which "combines technical and artistic skills in a manner that makes this an unusually good piece of murder mystery entertainment." The film ranked fifth on Cahiers du Cinéma's Top 10 Films of the Year List in 1955.

Time called it "just possibly the second-most entertaining picture (after The 39 Steps) ever made by Alfred Hitchcock" and a film in which there is "never an instant ... when Director Hitchcock is not in minute and masterly control of his material." The reviewer also noted the "occasional studied lapses of taste and, more important, the eerie sense a Hitchcock audience has of reacting in a manner so carefully foreseen as to seem practically foreordained." Harrison's Reports named the film as a "first-rate thriller" that is "strictly an adult entertainment, but it should prove to be a popular one." They further added, "What helps to make the story highly entertaining is the fact that it is enhanced by clever dialogue and by delightful touches of comedy and romance that relieve the tension."

Nearly 30 years after the film's initial release, Roger Ebert reviewed the re-release by Universal Pictures in October 1983, after Hitchcock's estate was settled. He said the film "develops such a clean, uncluttered line from beginning to end that we're drawn through it (and into it) effortlessly. The experience is not so much like watching a movie, as like ... well, like spying on your neighbors. Hitchcock traps us right from the first ... And because Hitchcock makes us accomplices in Stewart's voyeurism, we're along for the ride. When an enraged man comes bursting through the door to kill Stewart, we can't detach ourselves, because we looked too, and so we share the guilt and in a way we deserve what's coming to him." In 1983, reviewing the film Vincent Canby wrote "Its appeal, which goes beyond that of other, equally masterly Hitchcock works, remains undiminished."

The review aggregator website Rotten Tomatoes reports an approval rating of 99% based on 138 reviews, with an average rating of 9.6/10. The critics' consensus states that "Hitchcock exerted full potential of suspense in this masterpiece." At Metacritic, the film has a weighted average score of a very rare perfect 100 out of 100 based on 18 critics, indicating "universal acclaim". In his 2012 review of the film, Killian Fox of The Guardian wrote: "Hitchcock made a career out of indulging our voyeuristic tendencies, and he never excited them more skillfully, or with more gleeful self-awareness, than in Rear Window".

== Awards and nominations ==
Award	Date of ceremony	Category	Recipient	Result
Venice Film Festival	August 22 to September 7, 1954	Golden Lion	Alfred Hitchcock	Nominated
National Board of Review Awards	December 20, 1954	Best Actress	Grace Kelly	Won
NYFCC Awards	January 1955	Best Actress	Grace Kelly	Won
NYFCC Awards	January 1955	Best Director	Alfred Hitchcock	Runner-up
DGA Award	February 13, 1955	Outstanding Achievement in Feature Film	Alfred Hitchcock	Nominated
Writers Guild of America Awards	February 28, 1955	Best Written American Drama	John Michael Hayes	Nominated
BAFTA Award	March 10, 1955	Best Film	Rear Window	Nominated
Academy Awards	March 30, 1955	Best Director	Alfred Hitchcock	Nominated
Academy Awards	March 30, 1955	Best Adapted Screenplay	John Michael Hayes	Nominated
Academy Awards	March 30, 1955	Best Cinematography – Color	Robert Burks	Nominated
Academy Awards	March 30, 1955	Best Sound – Recording	Loren L. Ryder	Nominated
Edgar Allan Poe Awards	April 21, 1955	Best Motion Picture Screenplay	John Michael Hayes	Won
National Film Preservation Board	November 18, 1997	National Film Registry	Rear Window	Won
Online Film & Television Association Award	2002	OFTA Film Hall of Fame – Motion Picture	Rear Window	Won

== Legacy ==
In 1997, Rear Window was selected for preservation in the United States National Film Registry by the Library of Congress as being "culturally, historically, or aesthetically significant". By this time, the film interested other directors with its theme of voyeurism, and other reworkings of the film soon followed, which included Brian De Palma's 1984 film Body Double and Phillip Noyce's 1993 film Sliver. In 1998 Time Out magazine conducted a poll and Rear Window was voted the 21st greatest film of all time. In 2006, Writers Guild of America West ranked its screenplay 83rd in WGA’s list of 101 Greatest Screenplays. In the British Film Institute's 2012 Sight & Sound polls of the greatest films ever made, Rear Window was ranked 53rd among critics and 48th among directors. In the 2022 edition of the magazine's Greatest films of all time list the film ranked 38th in the critics poll. In 2017 Empire magazine's readers' poll ranked Rear Window at No. 72 on its list of The 100 Greatest Movies. In 2022, Time Out magazine ranked the film at No. 26 on their list of "The 100 best thriller films of all time". In 2025, Entertainment Weekly ranked Rear Window 5th in its list of The 40 best thriller movies of all time.

Rear Window was restored by the team of Robert A. Harris and James C. Katz for its 1999 limited theatrical re-release (using Technicolor dye-transfer prints for the first time in this title's history) and the Collector's Edition DVD release in 2000.

American Film Institute included the film as number 42 in AFI's 100 Years...100 Movies, number 14 in AFI's 100 Years...100 Thrills, number 48 in AFI's 100 Years...100 Movies (10th Anniversary Edition) and number three in AFI's 10 Top 10 (Mysteries).

Rear Window was one of five films that Hitchcock made with Paramount that were included under a deal in which the rights reverted to him after eight years. Hitchcock removed all five films from circulation for almost 20 years (often referred to as "The Lost Hitchcocks" or "The Forbidden Five"), and he rarely granted rights for them to be shown publicly. The rights were purchased by Universal in 1983 for a rumored $6 million, after which they were re-released in theaters. These films include: Vertigo, Rear Window, The Man Who Knew Too Much (1956), Rope, and The Trouble With Harry.

Rear Window was remade as a TV movie of the same name in 1998, with an updated storyline in which the lead character is paralyzed and lives in a high-tech home filled with assistive technology. Actor Christopher Reeve, himself paralyzed as a result of a 1995 horse-riding accident, was cast in the lead role. The telefilm also starred Daryl Hannah, Robert Forster, Ruben Santiago-Hudson, and Anne Twomey.

Rear Window has directly influenced plot elements and themes of numerous Brian De Palma films, particularly Hi, Mom! (1970), Sisters (1972), Dressed to Kill (1980), and Body Double (1984).

Disturbia (2007) is a modern-day retelling, with the protagonist (Shia LaBeouf) under house arrest instead of laid up with a broken leg, and who believes that his neighbor is a serial killer rather than having committed a single murder. On September 5, 2008, the Sheldon Abend Trust sued Steven Spielberg, DreamWorks, Viacom, and Universal Studios, alleging that the producers of Disturbia violated the copyright to the original Woolrich story owned by Abend. On September 21, 2010, the U.S. District Court in Abend v. Spielberg, 748 F.Supp.2d 200 (S.D.N.Y. 2010), ruled that Disturbia did not infringe the original Woolrich story.

The 2004 horror film Saw pays homage to Rear Window, in a particular scene involving the character Adam Stanheight (Leigh Whannell). In the film, Adam is kidnapped and uses a camera to take photos with his camera to illuminate the dark surroundings, mirroring the actions of Jeff in Rear Window, with both scenes sharing a similar tone.

Numerous television episodes have paid homage to, or spoofed, Rear Window, including the Simpsons episode "Bart of Darkness," the Pretty Little Liars episode "How the 'A' Stole Christmas," CSI: NY episode "Point of View," season four episode seven of 9-1-1, "Night Terrors," the second episode of season 2 of the British crime drama Whitstable Pearl, the 100th episode of Castle, "The Lives of Others," "Mrs. Crabtree's Neighbourhood," season 17, episode 2 of Murdoch Mysteries, "Rear Window" (a 1994 episode of BBC comedy series The Detectives starring Jasper Carrott), and "Front Window", a 2022 episode of BBC sitcom Not Going Out.

In February 2008, the film was referenced as a part of Variety's The 2008 Hollywood Portfolio: Hitchcock Classics spread, with Scarlett Johansson and Javier Bardem as Lisa and Jeff, respectively.

Rear Window has been referenced multiple times by singer-songwriter Taylor Swift. In the music video for her single "Me!", Swift wears a dress similar to one of Edith Head's designs worn by Grace Kelly. Swift has also stated that the voyeuristic elements of the film inspired the storytelling of her album Folklore.

Murder in the Building (French: Le Crime du 3e étage, lit. 'The Crime on the 3rd Floor'), a 2026 homage to Hitchcock, directly references Rear Window.

== Home media ==
On September 25, 2012, Universal Studios Home Entertainment released Rear Window for the first time on Blu-ray as part of the "Alfred Hitchcock: The Masterpiece Collection". This edition included numerous supplemental features such as an audio commentary from John Fawell, excerpts from Hitchcock's interview with François Truffaut, two theatrical trailers, and an interview with the film's screenwriter John Michael Hayes.

On May 6, 2014, Universal Pictures Home Entertainment re-released Rear Window on Blu-ray with the same supplemental features.

== See also ==
- List of films featuring surveillance
