= Stewart v. Abend =

- Supreme Court of the United States

Argued January 9, 1990 Decided April 24, 1990
- Full case name: Stewart et al. v. Abend, DBA Authors Research Co.
- Citations: 495 U.S. 207 (more) 110 S. Ct. 1750; 109 L. Ed. 2d 184; 1990 U.S. LEXIS 2184; 58 U.S.L.W. 4511; 14 U.S.P.Q.2D (BNA) 1614; Copy. L. Rep. (CCH) ¶ 26,557

Case history
- Prior: Abend filed suit in District Court, S. Dis. of NY, settled; filed again, District Court, C. Dis. of CA, court granted Stewart's sum. judg. motion based on fair use and Rohauer v. Killiam Shows, Inc., 551 F.2d 484, denied other motions; both parties appealed, Ninth Circuit reversed, Abend v. MCA, Inc., 863 F.2d 1465, 1472 (1988); cert. granted, 493 U.S. 807 (1989).

Holding
- The Court held that the successor copyright owner's right to permit the creation of a derivative work passes to the heirs of the author of the work, who are not bound by the original author's agreement to permit such use.

Court membership
- Chief Justice William Rehnquist Associate Justices William J. Brennan Jr. · Byron White; Thurgood Marshall · Harry Blackmun; John P. Stevens · Sandra Day O'Connor; Antonin Scalia · Anthony Kennedy

Case opinions
- Majority: O'Connor, joined by Brennan, Marshall, Blackmun, Kennedy
- Concurrence: White
- Dissent: Stevens, joined by Rehnquist, Scalia

Laws applied
- Copyright Acts of 1909 and 1976

Stewart v. Abend, 495 U.S. 207 (1990), was a United States Supreme Court decision holding that a successor copyright owner (one who obtains ownership later on, such as the heirs of a copyright owner who dies) has the exclusive right to permit the creation and exploitation of derivative works, regardless of potentially conflicting agreements by prior copyright holders.

== Facts ==
Cornell Woolrich originally wrote the short story "It Had to Be Murder", and sold the publication rights to Popular Publications, Inc., which published the story in its Dime Detective Magazine (February 1942 issue). Three years later, Woolrich sold the movie rights to a production company, and agreed by contract to renew those rights when the 28-year copyright (then in force) expired. In 1953 the movie rights were bought for $10,000 by Patron Inc., a production company formed by actor James Stewart and director Alfred Hitchcock. The short story was then made into the acclaimed movie Rear Window (1954), directed by Hitchcock and starring Stewart.

Woolrich died in 1968, before the expiration of his 28-year copyright, and control of the literary rights passed to his executor, Chase Manhattan Bank. Chase sold the movie rights for $650 to literary agent Sheldon Abend. In 1971 and 1974, ABC aired the film through a licensing agreement with Stewart, Hitchcock, and MCA Inc. Abend, refusing to honor Woolrich's original agreement to renew the copyright and assign it to the owner of the movie rights, sued Stewart in response to this. Ultimately, Abend dismissed his suit and he was awarded $25,000. During the 1980s, Abend claims he sought to create a play and television version of "It Had to Be Murder" with HBO.

== Opinion of the Court ==
The question presented was whether the owner of a legal derivative work infringes the rights of the successor copyright owner, by continued distribution and publication of the derivative work during the renewal term of the pre-existing work. The Court held that the assignment was an unfulfilled contingency that died with the author; the successor can prevent continued use of the derivative work.

In justifying its decision, the Court noted that control of the work reverts to the author—or author’s successors—when renewal comes up. This protects the author (and the heirs) from being deprived of the surprising value of the work.

== See also ==
- List of United States Supreme Court cases, volume 495
- List of United States Supreme Court cases
- Lists of United States Supreme Court cases by volume
- List of United States Supreme Court cases by the Rehnquist Court
