= Eddie Duggan =

British photographer and filmmaker

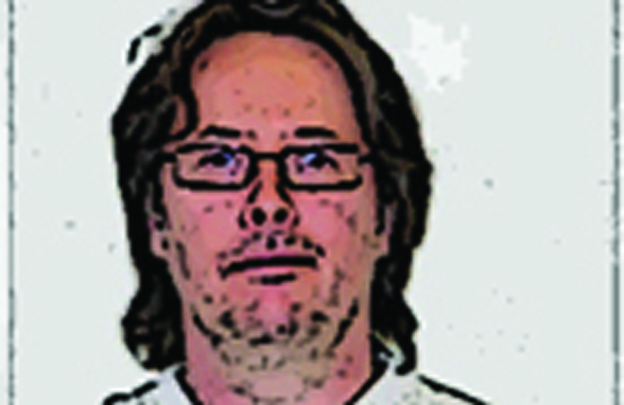
Eddie Duggan photographic portrait

Eddie Duggan is a British photographer, film-maker, screenwriter, author and academic games historian.

== Photography ==
Eddie Duggan's photographs of bands on the burgeoning music scene in 1970s London have been published in both the underground and the mainstream music press. His photographs have been published in fanzines including Sniffin' Glue and Livewire as well as in titles including New Musical Express, Sounds and Record Mirror. Duggan's photographs have also appeared in books, including Sam Knee (2017) Untypical Girls: Styles and Sounds of the Transatlantic Indie Revolution, Teal Triggs (2010) Fanzines, and Paul Marko (2007) The Roxy, London WC2: A Punk History. Some of Duggan's recollections of early punk gigs in London are included in "a really great interview with Eddie Duggan" and Duggan is also discussed by Deborah Harry and Chris Stein in Making Tracks: The Rise of Blondie.

An exhibition, entitled A la recherche du punk perdu showed Duggan's photography together with that of Blondie-founder Chris Stein at the University of Suffolk. The exhibition also included fanzines, flyers, badges and books from the collection of Professor Teal Triggs. Chris Stein includes a photograph of Duggan in Making Tracks: The Rise of Blondie, in which Stein and Deborah Harry recall their first meeting him during a press event in London at which he represented Sniffin' Glue. Duggan subsequently toured with Blondie and was pressed into service as a giant ant, performing nightly on stage with Deborah Harry during the song Attack of the Giant Ants. Duggan is also pictured on the cover of the New Wave compilation album (Vertigo, 1978). He appears in the iconic and much-reproduced Chris Moorhouse photograph of the Clash gig at London's Rainbow Theatre, 9 May 1977, in which the audience passes broken seats on to the stage. Duggan discusses the photograph and the gig in an article in The Guardian.

== Machinima ==
As a film maker, Duggan's directorial debut is an animated 14-minute short, a machinima piece entitled "Looking for the Truth" which was screened at the Ma-Machinima International Film Festival in Amsterdam (2011). Duggan's machinima piece has also been shown at an Exploding cinema event in London (2012) and was also featured in the highlights reel of the 2010 MachinimaExpo held in Second Life.

Duggan was also involved with the hosting of Machinexpo 2009, providing the venue in form of UCSVille, a second-life island featuring virtual campus created by a computer game design student Radek Spacek. Duggan is also the subject of a case-study for his machinima-related teaching, in which he is credited as something of a pioneer, being one of the first to use machinima creatively in Higher Education.

== Writing ==
As a writer of fiction, Duggan is credited with the screenplay Hamsters, which was selected as a Twisted Horror Picture Show short-screenplay finalist in the 2016 Twister Alley Film Festival. His crime genre short-stories have also been published in the now-defunct Blue Murder Magazine and in the British title Crime Time. The latter has also published a number of Duggan's articles about various hardboiled and Noir fiction authors, including Dashiell Hammett, David Goodis and Cornell Woolrich.

== Academia ==
Eddie Duggan is also an academic games historian. He hosted the 2014 Board Game Studies Colloquium at UCS (which has since become the University of Suffolk) and subsequently edited a volume of proceedings published by Associação Ludus. As a member of the International Board Game Studies Association, Duggan regularly presents research related to the history of games and has contributed a chapter on Pervasive Games to a collection published by Springer in the Gaming Media and Social Effects series.
