= Marihuana (novel) =

1941 novella by Cornell Woolrich

- Author: Cornell Woolrich
- Language: English
- Series: Dell 10 Cent Books
- Genre: Mystery novel
- Publisher: Detective Fiction Weekly, Dell Publishing
- Publication date: 1941, 1951
- Publication place: United States
- Media type: Print (Magazine & Paperback)
- Pages: 64 pp
- Preceded by: The Black Curtain
- Followed by: Black Alibi

Marihuana is a 1941 novella by Cornell Woolrich, published under the pen-name William Irish. The story is about a man who goes on a murder spree after being exposed to marijuana for the first time.

== Plot ==
King Turner is in a deep funk after his wife, Eleanor, left him. He's fallen in with a pair of reprobates, Bill Evans and Wash Gordon, who are more interested in him as the butt of their jokes than as a friend. One night they drag King and a girl named Vinnie to a "ranch"—a sort of speakeasy where people smoke "grass".

After getting high, King hallucinates that Vinnie is his ex-wife and begins chasing her around the room. Bill hands him a knife as a lark and tells him to "pin her down." King does exactly that and then flees the room. He finds a sleeping bouncer and steals the man's gun. Before he can leave the ranch, a couple police officers arrive, but King manages to sneak past them.

King evades pursuit and hides out in the phone booth of a candy store. While there, a police officer enters and walks towards the store's proprietor to buy a numbers ticket, but King, paranoid from the marijuana, thinks the officer is there to arrest him, and responds by gunning the man down. King flees the store and heads to the hotel where his ex-wife is living.

Eleanor agrees to talk with King in her room. After hearing his story, she tries to calm him down but with little effect. She convinces him to let her order some sandwiches and coffee from room service. On the phone, she tells the clerk that she wants her order fixed "just like the other night," referring to the fact that she'd had sleeping powder added to her coffee to help with insomnia.

But before the order can arrive, King grows paranoid that Eleanor has betrayed him to the police. When he thinks room service is taking too long, King shoots Eleanor and flees the room. With nowhere else to go, he heads back to his apartment, where the police are waiting for him. King escapes onto the ledge of the building. Detective Spillane, the officer in charge of catching him, follows him out, but before he can save him, King jumps to his death.

The book ends with a final twist—back in her apartment Vinnie is alive and well, telling a friend about the gag she, Bill and Wash had pulled on King. Bill had only handed King a butter knife, and when King stabbed her, Vinnie took a ketchup-soaked piece of bread and squeezed it to simulate blood. Vinnie is completely unaware of subsequent events and thinks the whole situation hilarious, though her friend has doubts. The story ends with Detective Spillane arriving and Vinnie's friend thinking, "He's either a bill collector or a plainclothesman ... or maybe a little of both."

== Portrayal of policemen ==
Detective Spillane appears throughout the story as a competent officer who is simply one step behind King, and genuinely wants to help him. However the rest of the police force does not fare so well. When the two officers arrive at the ranch, the proprietor lets them in without making any effort to hide the illicit behavior inside, indicating that the officers are on the take. Likewise, the officer King shoots was attempting to purchase an illegal numbers ticket from the owner of the candy store.

== Depiction of marijuana ==
Woolrich's depiction of marijuana is in keeping with popular views of the time which saw the drug as causing "insanity, criminality, and death," according to Federal Bureau of Narcotics Commissioner Harry J. Anslinger In his efforts to circumscribe marijuana use, Anslinger disseminated stories based on the trope of "marijuana-crime-insanity", such as allegedly evidenced by the Victor Licata case in which the 21-year-old murdered his family with an axe. (Licata was schizophrenic with homicidal tendencies; there is no evidence that marijuana was a factor in the killings.)

Inhaling marijuana smoke initially makes King lethargic and he loses all sense of time—something that continues throughout the story as he thinks several days have gone by despite it being the same night; his murder of Eleanor is prompted by his insistence that a half-hour has passed since she ordered room service, when in fact it was only five minutes. King and his friends also experience munchies which causes Bill to raid the ranch's kitchen for food; King later notes that "the hempseeds create a false, insatiable appetite." King's lethargy soon turns to hallucinations and paranoia, which causes him to embark upon his murder spree.

Though King and his friends are all middle class, they travel to Hell's Kitchen, an area that had been a center for bootleggers during Prohibition. The "ranch" operates similarly to a speakeasy—the proprietor bribes local police officers, visitors leave their cars several blocks away so as not to draw attention to the ranch, and a bouncer guards the door, inspecting each person through a peephole before letting them enter. Peculiarly, Woolrich has the ranch operate as a buffet, with each visitor paying a cover charge in exchange for an unlimited amount of marijuana.

The term "ranch" is Woolrich's own invention, derived from the slang term for marijuana, "grass." Characters also refer to it as "reefer," though they always describe the joints as cigarettes.

== Publication history ==
Marijuana first appeared in the May 3, 1941 edition of Detective Fiction Weekly. Dell later published it as volume 11 of their 10 Cent Book line. Like the other books of this series, original editions are now collector's items that can sell for more than $100.
