= The Bride Wore Black =

1968 film by François Truffaut

- Theatrical release poster
- French: La mariée était en noir
- Directed by: François Truffaut
- Screenplay by: François Truffaut; Jean-Louis Richard
- Based on: The Bride Wore Black by William Irish
- Produced by: Marcel Berbert; Oscar Lewenstein
- Starring: Jeanne Moreau; Michel Bouquet; Jean-Claude Brialy; Charles Denner; Claude Rich; Michael Lonsdale; Daniel Boulanger; Alexandra Stewart
- Cinematography: Raoul Coutard
- Edited by: Claudine Bouché
- Music by: Bernard Herrmann
- Production companies: Les Films du Carrosse; Les Productions Artistes Associés; Dino de Laurentiis Cinematografica
- Distributed by: Les Artistes Associés (France); Dear Film (Italy)
- Release dates: 22 March 1968 (West Germany); 17 April 1968 (France); 30 April 1968 (Italy)
- Running time: 107 minutes
- Countries: France; Italy
- Language: French
- Budget: $747,000
- Box office: $9.6 million

The Bride Wore Black (French: La mariée était en noir, lit. 'The Bride Was in Black') is a 1968 psychological thriller film directed by François Truffaut from a screenplay he co-wrote with Jean-Louis Richard, based on the 1940 novel of the same name by William Irish, a pseudonym for Cornell Woolrich. It stars Jeanne Moreau, Michel Bouquet, Jean-Claude Brialy, Charles Denner, Claude Rich, Michael Lonsdale, Daniel Boulanger and Alexandra Stewart. Truffaut, a Hitchcock admirer, enlisted Bernard Herrmann to score the film. The film's costumes were designed by Pierre Cardin.

The plot follows a widow who seeks revenge on the five men who killed her husband on their wedding day. Throughout the film, she wears only white, black or a combination of the two.

== Plot ==
Julie Kohler attempts suicide by jumping out of an upstairs window, but is stopped by her mother. Later, after packing her clothes and a large sum of money, Julie says goodbye to her mother and leaves on a trip.

On the French Riviera, Julie looks for a man named Bliss, a reformed womaniser. When she arrives at his engagement party at his high-rise apartment, he is instantly intrigued by her. Julie lures Bliss onto the balcony, where she tosses her scarf onto the awning support pole and persuades him to retrieve it in exchange for revealing her identity. As he climbs over the balcony, she tells him her name and pushes him to his death before she flees.

Julie's next victim is Robert Coral, a lonely bachelor. She lures him to a classical music concert and they agree to meet the following night. Before their rendezvous, Julie buys a bottle of arak and injects a syringe of poison into it. When she meets Coral at his studio apartment, she serves him the drink. As he collapses in agony, she reveals her identity to him. In a flashback, shortly after a couple's wedding ceremony, the groom is shot dead on the steps outside the church; Julie is the widowed bride. Coral insists it was an accident and begs for his life before ultimately dying.

The next target is Clément Morane, a would-be politician. After following his wife and young son Cookie to their suburban home, Julie befriends Cookie and tricks the wife into leaving the house with a fake telegram claiming that her mother is ill. Julie poses as Cookie's teacher, Miss Becker, and offers to cook dinner for Morane and his son. Although Cookie insists that Julie is not his teacher, Morane invites her to stay. She plays hide-and-seek with Cookie, discovering a small cupboard under a staircase, before putting him to bed. When Julie pretends to have lost her ring, Morane crawls into the cupboard to search for it. She locks him inside and reveals her true identity. He pleads for his life, explaining that what happened was an accident.

Another flashback reveals that Julie's husband was accidentally killed by a rifle shot fired by Delvaux, a member of an informal hunting club that also included Bliss, Coral, Morane and Fergus. The five men were carelessly playing with a loaded rifle in a building across the street from the church. After the incident, they went their separate ways, intending never to reveal their involvement in the groom's death. Julie seals the cupboard door with duct tape, leaving Morane to suffocate. The real Miss Becker is arrested after Cookie tells the police that she is the one who killed his father, but Julie exonerates her with an anonymous phone call, claiming responsibility for the murder.

Julie waits in Delvaux's junkyard, planning to kill him with a handgun, but before she can, he is arrested by the police for selling stolen cars. She moves on to find the fifth member of the hunting group, Fergus, a womanising artist. Julie becomes his model for a series of illustrations depicting the huntress Diana. He soon admits to romantic feelings for her, but she rebuffs him, and eventually shoots him in the back with an arrow. After cutting her face out of one of Fergus' paintings, she discovers a full-length nude mural of herself painted by Fergus on his wall. She prepares to paint over the mural, but decides against it and leaves.

Julie attends Fergus's funeral, where she is recognised by Corey, a close friend of both Bliss and Fergus who had met her at Bliss's engagement party. At the police station, she coldly confesses to murdering the four men, but refuses to disclose her motive. Julie is sent to the same prison where Delvaux is incarcerated. While helping the matrons serve food to the other inmates, Julie hides a kitchen knife, which she then uses to stab Delvaux off-screen.

== Cast ==
- Jeanne Moreau as Julie Kohler
- Michel Bouquet as Robert Coral
- Jean-Claude Brialy as Corey
- Charles Denner as Fergus
- Claude Rich as Bliss
- Michel Lonsdale as Clément Morane
- Daniel Boulanger as Delvaux
- Alexandra Stewart as Miss Becker
- Serge Rousseau as David Kohler, Julie's husband
- Christophe Bruno as Cookie Morane

== Production ==
The Bride Wore Black was shot from 16 May to 24 July 1967 in and around Paris and in Versailles, Chevilly-Larue, Senlis and Cannes.

== Release ==
=== Critical reception ===
The film received hostile criticism in France on its original release, and Truffaut later admitted that he no longer liked the film, and that the critics were right. Eventually, the movie received better reviews, and currently has an 85% approval rating on Rotten Tomatoes from critics. During the 1983 Chicago International Film Festival, Truffaut was asked which of his films he would change if he could. He named this film, saying that it was the first time "we" had worked in colour and the emotional tone of many scenes came out wrong. In fact, two years earlier, Truffaut had made Fahrenheit 451 in England in colour with Nicolas Roeg as his cinematographer. Clarification became available in 2009, when Robert Osborne introduced Turner Classic Movies' showing of The Bride Wore Black. Cinematographer Raoul Coutard, who had worked with Truffaut on five previous films, had already made several colour films with Jean-Luc Godard and had his own ideas on shooting. Coutard and Truffaut had multiple day-long arguments, and in many scenes direction to the actors was provided by the film's star, Jeanne Moreau. At the film's premiere, Truffaut was tormented by the contrast between the emotional notes he had intended to give the actors and the finished film, but he was too discreet in 1983 to admit the depths of his disappointment or to blame Coutard even indirectly.

John Simon described The Bride Wore Black as "a piece of junk".

Roger Ebert's review in The Chicago Sun-Times was more positive, giving The Bride Wore Black 3.5 stars out of a possible four. He praised Moreau's performance and wrote that, with the obvious tributes to Alfred Hitchcock throughout the film, Truffaut had succeeded in creating "a marriage of the French new wave and Hollywood tradition".

Despite the mixed critical reaction, it was nominated for a Golden Globe Award for Best Foreign Language Film. The film was also a financial success, having 1,274,411 and 867,293 cinema admissions in France and Spain respectively. Additionally, the film grossed $2,000,000 in rentals worldwide, $1.75 million of which came from outside North America.

It earned rentals of $32,000 in the US.

=== Accolades ===
Year	Award ceremony	Category	Nominee	Result
2019	IFMCA Awards	Best New Release or New Recording of an Existing Score	Bernard Herrmann, Fernando Velázquez, José Maria Benìtez, Edouard Dubois, Frank K. DeWald, Nacho B. Govantes	Nominated
1969	Golden Globe Awards	Best Foreign Language Film	The Bride Wore Black	Nominated
1969	Edgar Allan Poe Awards	Best Motion Picture Screenplay	Jean-Louis Richard, François Truffaut	Nominated
1969	NBR Awards	Top 10 Foreign Language Films	The Bride Wore Black	Won
1968	Cahiers du Cinéma	Annual Top 10 List	François Truffaut	10th

== Influence ==
The 1970 Jesus Franco film She Killed in Ecstasy, starring Soledad Miranda as the vengeful bride, has the same premise, but approaches the story in a more linear fashion.

It inspired the 1971 Turkish film Melek mi, Şeytan mı.

It inspired the 1976 Hindi film Nagin.

The film was also the inspiration for Kate Bush's song "The Wedding List" on her album Never for Ever.

Although Kill Bill by Quentin Tarantino tells a story with some similarities, such as the notebooks in which the brides cross off their victims' names once they have killed them, Tarantino has stated that he has never seen The Bride Wore Black.
