= Rear Window (1998 film) =

- Official release poster
- Based on: "It Had to Be Murder" 1942 story in Dime Detective by Cornell Woolrich; Rear Window 1954 film by Alfred Hitchcock
- Written by: Eric Overmyer; Larry Gross
- Directed by: Jeff Bleckner
- Starring: Christopher Reeve; Daryl Hannah; Robert Forster; Ruben Santiago-Hudson
- Music by: David Shire
- Country of origin: United States
- Original language: English

Production
- Executive producers: Christopher Reeve; Steven Haft; Robert Halmi Jr.; David V. Picker
- Producers: Sheldon Abend; Robert V. Gaulin
- Cinematography: Ken Kelsch
- Editor: Geoffrey Rowland
- Running time: 89 minutes
- Production companies: Cambria Productions; Haft Entertainment; Hallmark Entertainment

Original release
- Network: ABC
- Release: November 22, 1998

Rear Window is a 1998 American made-for-television crime-drama thriller film directed by Jeff Bleckner. The teleplay by Larry Gross and Eric Overmyer is an updated adaptation of the classic 1954 film of the same name directed by Alfred Hitchcock which was based on the short story It Had to Be Murder by Cornell Woolrich. It was broadcast in the United States by ABC on November 22, 1998.

The film stars Christopher Reeve (in one of his final screen appearances, and his last leading role), Daryl Hannah, and Robert Forster. It was Reeve's first substantial role since his tetraplegia-inducing injury in 1995. For his performance, Reeve was nominated for a Golden Globe and won a Screen Actors Guild Award.

== Plot ==
Quadriplegic Jason Kemp, a former architect who now uses a wheelchair, relieves the boredom of his daily existence by spying on his neighbors from the rear window of his apartment. When he witnesses sculptor Julian Thorpe viciously beat his wife Ilene, he reports the incident to 9-1-1 and the police remove Thorpe from his home. Thorpe is released the following day, and that night Jason Kemp hears a blood-curdling scream from the courtyard. From that moment on, Ilene is missing from her apartment, apparently replaced by another woman. Jason, certain she was murdered by her husband, tries to convince his colleague Claudia, nurse Antonio, and friend Charlie that his suspicion is true. Thorpe slowly comes to the realization that Kemp is fully aware of his crime, and engages him in a deadly game of cat and mouse in an effort to silence him forever.

== Cast ==
- Christopher Reeve as Jason Kemp
- Daryl Hannah as Claudia Henderson
- Robert Forster as Detective Charlie Moore
- Ruben Santiago-Hudson as Antonio Fredericks
- Anne Twomey as Leila Kemp
- Ritchie Coster as Julian Thorpe
- Allison Mackie as Ilene Thorpe
- Ali Marsh as Alison Rothman
- Jeanie Columbo as Nurse

== Production ==
=== Casting ===
The role of Jason Kemp was the first film for Christopher Reeve following the 1995 Memorial Day fall from horseback riding that left him paralyzed. Scenes detailing his character's rehabilitation were based on his own physical therapy experiences. On the set the actor reached a personal milestone: speaking without being plugged into his ventilator for the first time.

=== Filming ===
Rear Window was filmed on location in the New York City metropolitan area, at the Burke Rehabilitation Center (where Reeve was being treated) in White Plains, New York, and in two converted Otis Elevator warehouses in Yonkers. Scenes were also shot at the New Jersey Performing Arts Center in Newark.

== Reception ==
=== Critical response ===
The review aggregator website Rotten Tomatoes reported that 36% of critics have given the film a positive review based on 11 reviews, with an average rating of 5.04/10. Reeve's performance was near universally praised, with Variety saying "Christopher Reeve turns in a sensational performance in ABC's 'Rear Window,' remade with the actor in mind", the Chicago Tribune said "The results are decidedly mixed but Reeve's performance, the real reason people would want to tune in anyway, is a winner" and The Hollywood Reporter said "Reeve, even though physically immobile, does an excellent, sometimes wrenching job, with some effective dramatic construction by director Jeff Bleckner. Reeve has strong moments. Good stuff.". However, Tom Shales writing in The Washington Post, used his review to take personal pot-shots at the actor, complaining "Obviously what happened to him was terrible. But frankly, some of us have had it up to here with his courage in the face of adversity. And now 'Rear Window' has been reconfigured in the face of adversity too. Reeve's 'Rear Window' isn't 'Rear Window' at all but rather the umpty-umpth chapter in the Christopher Reeve Story."

=== Accolades ===
| Award | Category | Subject | Result |
|---|---|---|---|
| Golden Globe Award | Best Actor – Miniseries or Television Film | Christopher Reeve | Nominated |
| Primetime Emmy Award | Outstanding Music Composition for a Limited Series, Movie, or Special | David Shire | Nominated |
| Screen Actors Guild Award | Outstanding Performance by a Male Actor in a Miniseries or Television Movie | Christopher Reeve | Won |
| Edgar Award | Best Television Feature or Miniseries | Larry Gross | Nominated |
| Edgar Award | Best Television Feature or Miniseries | Eric Overmyer | Nominated |
| Edgar Award | Best Television Feature or Miniseries | Cornell Woolrich | Nominated |

== See also ==
- List of television films produced for American Broadcasting Company
- Remakes of films by Alfred Hitchcock
