= Cornell Woolrich =

American novelist (1903–1968)

- Born: Cornell George Hopley Woolrich; December 4, 1903; New York City, US
- Died: September 25, 1968 (aged 64); New York City, US
- Education: Columbia University
- Occupation: Writer (novelist)
- Spouse: Violet Virginia Blackton (m. 1930; ann. 1933) (d.1965)
- Writing career
- Pen name: William Irish, George Hopley

Cornell George Hopley Woolrich (/ˈwʊlrɪtʃ/ WUUL-ritch; December 4, 1903 – September 25, 1968) was an American novelist and short story writer, also known under the pseudonyms William Irish and George Hopley. His biographer, Francis Nevins Jr., rated Woolrich the fourth best crime writer of his day, behind Dashiell Hammett, Erle Stanley Gardner and Raymond Chandler.

Some of Woolrich's works have been adapted to important films. Rear Window (1954) by Alfred Hitchcock is based on his short story "It Had to Be Murder" (1942), and The Bride Wore Black (1968) by François Truffaut is based on his novel of the same name (1940).

== Biography ==
Woolrich was born in New York City. His parents separated when he was young, and he lived for a time in Mexico with his father before returning to New York to live with his mother, Claire Attalie Woolrich.

He attended Columbia University, where he was a member of the Philolexian Society, but left in 1926 without graduating when his first novel, Cover Charge, was published. As Eddie Duggan observes, "Woolrich enrolled at New York's Columbia University in 1921 where he spent a relatively undistinguished year until he was taken ill and was laid up for some weeks. It was during this illness (a Rear Window–like confinement involving a gangrenous foot, according to one version of the story) that Woolrich started writing, producing Cover Charge, which was published in 1926." Cover Charge was one of his Jazz Age novels inspired by the work of F. Scott Fitzgerald. A second short story, "Children of the Ritz", won Woolrich the first prize of $10,000 the following year in a competition organised by College Humor and First National Pictures; this led to his working as a screenwriter in Hollywood for First National Pictures. While in Hollywood, Woolrich explored his sexuality, apparently engaging in what Francis M. Nevins Jr. describes as "promiscuous and clandestine homosexual activity" and by marrying Violet Virginia Blackton, the 21-year-old daughter of J. Stuart Blackton, one of the founders of the Vitagraph studio. Failing in both his attempt at marriage and at establishing a career as a screenwriter (the unconsummated marriage was annulled in 1933; Woolrich garnered no screen credits), Woolrich sought to resume his life as a novelist:

Although Woolrich had published six 'jazz-age' novels, concerned with the party-antics and romances of the beautiful young things on the fringes of American society, between 1926 and 1932, he was unable to establish himself as a serious writer. Perhaps because the 'jazz-age' novel was dead in the water by the 1930s when the Depression had begun to take hold, Woolrich was unable to find a publisher for his seventh novel, I Love You, Paris, so he literally threw away the typescript, dumped it in a dustbin, and re-invented himself as a pulp writer.

When he turned to pulp and detective fiction, Woolrich's output was so prolific his work was often published under one of his many pseudonyms. For example, "William Irish" was the byline in Dime Detective Magazine (February 1942) on his 1942 story "It Had to Be Murder", which was the source of the 1954 Alfred Hitchcock movie Rear Window and itself based on H.G. Wells' short story "Through a Window". François Truffaut filmed Woolrich's The Bride Wore Black and Waltz into Darkness in 1968 and 1969, respectively, the latter as Mississippi Mermaid. Ownership of the copyright in Woolrich's original story "It Had to Be Murder" and its use for Rear Window was litigated before the US Supreme Court in Stewart v. Abend, 495 U.S. 207 (1990). Woolrich phased out the use of pseudonyms by the early 1950s, so that even though "It Had To Be Murder" was credited on initial publication to "William Irish", Rear Window credited its story on-screen to Cornell Woolrich.

He returned to New York, where he and his mother moved into the Hotel Marseilles (Broadway and West 103rd Street on Manhattan's Upper West Side). Eddie Duggan observes that "[a]lthough his writing made him wealthy, Woolrich and his mother lived in a series of seedy hotel rooms, including the squalid Hotel Marseilles apartment building in Harlem [sic], among a group of thieves, prostitutes and lowlifes that would not be out of place in Woolrich's dark fictional world." Woolrich lived there until his mother's death on October 6, 1957, which prompted his move to the slightly more upscale Hotel Franconia (20 West 72nd Street near Central Park). Duggan wrote:

[After] Woolrich's mother died in 1957, he [went] into a sharp physical and mental decline.

In later years, he socialized on occasion in Manhattan bars with Mystery Writers of America colleagues and younger fans such as writer Ron Goulart. He moved later to the Sheraton-Russell on Park Avenue and became a virtual recluse. In his 60s, with his eyesight failing, lonely, wracked by guilt over his homosexuality, tortured by self-doubt, alcoholic and a diabetic, Woolrich neglected himself to such a degree that he allowed a foot infection to become gangrenous which resulted, early in 1968, in the amputation of a leg.

After the amputation and a conversion to Catholicism, Woolrich returned to the Sheraton-Russell, requiring the use of a wheelchair. Some of the staff there would take Woolrich down to the lobby so he could look out on the passing traffic.

Woolrich did not attend the premiere of Truffaut's film of his novel The Bride Wore Black in 1968, even though it was held in New York City. He died September 25, 1968.

Woolrich bequeathed his estate of about $850,000 to Columbia University to endow scholarships in his mother's memory for writing students. His papers are also kept at the Columbia University Libraries.

== Bibliography ==
Most of Woolrich's books are out of print, and new editions were slow to come out because of estate issues. However, new collections of his short stories were issued in the early 1990s. As of February 3, 2020, the Faded Page has seven titles available as ebooks in the public domain in Canada; these may be still under copyright elsewhere. In 2020 and 2021, Otto Penzler's "American Mystery Classics" series released new editions of Waltz into Darkness and The Bride Wore Black in both hardcover and paperback. In January 2025, a ebook complete novels edition for countries where his work falls in the public domain has been released by Delphi Classics.

Woolrich died leaving fragments of an unfinished novel, titled The Loser; fragments have been published separately and also collected in Tonight, Somewhere in New York (2005).

=== Novels ===
Year	Title	Author Credit	Notes
1926	Cover Charge	Cornell Woolrich	
1927	Children of the Ritz	Cornell Woolrich	
1929	Times Square	Cornell Woolrich	
1930	A Young Man's Heart	Cornell Woolrich	
1931	The Time of Her Life	Cornell Woolrich	
1932	Manhattan Love Song	Cornell Woolrich	
1940	The Bride Wore Black	Cornell Woolrich	
1941	The Black Curtain	Cornell Woolrich	
1941	Marihuana	William Irish	Published in paperback only
1942	Black Alibi	Cornell Woolrich	
1942	Phantom Lady	William Irish	
1943	The Black Angel	Cornell Woolrich	
1944	The Black Path of Fear	Cornell Woolrich	
1944	Deadline at Dawn	William Irish	Also published as an Armed Services Edition
1945	Night Has a Thousand Eyes	George Hopley	
1947	Waltz Into Darkness	William Irish	
1948	Rendezvous in Black	Cornell Woolrich	
1948	I Married a Dead Man	William Irish	
1950	Savage Bride	Cornell Woolrich	Published in paperback only
1950	Fright	George Hopley	
1951	You'll Never See Me Again	Cornell Woolrich	Published in paperback only
1951	Strangler's Serenade	William Irish	
1952	Eyes That Watch You	William Irish	
1952	Bluebeard's Seventh Wife	William Irish	Published in paperback only
1959	Death is My Dancing Partner	Cornell Woolrich	Published only in paperback
1960	The Doom Stone	Cornell Woolrich	Published only in paperback
1987	Into the Night	Cornell Woolrich	(Posthumous release, manuscript completed by Lawrence Block)

=== Short fiction collections ===
Year	Title	Author Credit	Notes
1943	I Wouldn't Be in Your Shoes	William Irish	Also published as an Armed Services Edition.
1944	After-Dinner Story	William Irish	Includes his noted 1941 novella "Marihuana". Also published as an Armed Services Edition.
1946	If I Should Die Before I Wake	William Irish	Published in paperback only.
1946	Borrowed Crime	William Irish	Published in paperback only.
1946	The Dancing Detective	William Irish	
1948	Dead Man Blues	William Irish	
1949	The Blue Ribbon	William Irish	
1950	Somebody on the Phone	William Irish	AKA Deadly Night Call
1950	Six Nights of Mystery	William Irish	Published in paperback only.
1956	Nightmare	Cornell Woolrich	Includes both previously published and unpublished stories.
1958	Violence	Cornell Woolrich	Includes both previously published and unpublished stories.
1958	Hotel Room	Cornell Woolrich	
1959	Beyond the Night	Cornell Woolrich	Published in paperback only.
1965	The Dark Side of Love	Cornell Woolrich	
1965	The Ten Faces of Cornell Woolrich	Cornell Woolrich	
1971	Nightwebs	Cornell Woolrich	
1978	Angels of Darkness	Cornell Woolrich	Introduction by Harlan Ellison.
1981	The Fantastic Stories of Cornell Woolrich	Cornell Woolrich	
1983	Four by Cornell Woolrich	Cornell Woolrich	
1984	Rear Window	Cornell Woolrich	
1985	Vampire's Honeymoon	Cornell Woolrich	
1985	Blind Date with Death	Cornell Woolrich	
1985	Darkness at Dawn	Cornell Woolrich	
1998	The Cornell Woolrich Omnibus	Cornell Woolrich	
2003	Night and Fear	Cornell Woolrich	
2005	Tonight Somewhere in New York	Cornell Woolrich	
2010	Four Novellas of Fear	Cornell Woolrich	
2011	Love and Night	Cornell Woolrich	

== Selected films based on Woolrich's fiction ==
- Manhattan Love Song (1934) (based on the novel), directed by Leonard Fields
- Convicted (1938) (based on the short story "Face Work"), directed by Leon Barsha
- Street of Chance (1942) (based on the novel The Black Curtain), directed by Jack Hively
- The Leopard Man (1943) (novel Black Alibi), directed by Jacques Tourneur
- Phantom Lady (1944) (based on the novel, as "William Irish"), directed by Robert Siodmak
- The Mark of the Whistler (1944) (based on the story "Dormant Account"), directed by William Castle
- Deadline at Dawn (1946) (based on the novel, as "William Irish"), the only film directed by stage director Harold Clurman
- Black Angel (1946) (based on the novel), directed by Roy William Neill
- The Chase (1946) (based on the novel The Black Path of Fear). directed by Arthur Ripley
- Fall Guy (1947) (based on the story "Cocaine"), directed by Reginald LeBorg
- The Guilty (1947) (based on the story "He Looked Like Murder"), directed by John Reinhardt
- Fear in the Night (1947) (based on the story "Nightmare"), directed by Maxwell Shane
- The Return of the Whistler (1948) (based on the story "All at Once, No Alice"), directed by D. Ross Lederman
- I Wouldn't Be in Your Shoes (1948) (based on the story), directed by William Nigh
- Night Has a Thousand Eyes (1948) (based on the novel (Note: Although the published novel was credited to the pseudonym "George Hopley", the film credits the novel to Cornell Woolrich)), directed by John Farrow
- The Window (1949) (based on the story "The Boy Cried Murder"), directed by Ted Tetzlaff
- No Man of Her Own (1950) (based on the novel I Married a Dead Man, as "William Irish"), directed by Mitchell Leisen
- The Earring (1951) (based on the story "The Death Stone"), directed by León Klimovsky
- The Trace of Some Lips (1952) (based on the story "Collared"), directed by Juan Bustillo Oro
- If I Should Die Before I Wake (1952), directed by Carlos Hugo Christensen
- Don't Ever Open That Door (1952) (an anthology film based on the stories "Somebody on the Phone" and "Humming Bird Comes Home") directed by Carlos Hugo Christensen
- Rear Window (1954) (based on the story "It Had to Be Murder"), directed by Alfred Hitchcock
- Obsession (1954) (based on the story "Silent as the Grave"), directed by Jean Delannoy
- The Glass Eye (1956), directed by Antonio Santillán
- Nightmare (1956) (based on the story), directed by Maxwell Shane
- Escapade (1957) (based on the story "Cinderella and the Mob"), directed by Ralph Habib
- Ah, Bomb! (1964) (based on the story Adventures of a Fountain Pen), directed by Kihachi Okamoto
- The Boy Cried Murder (1966) (based on the story The Boy Cried Murder), directed by George P. Breakston
- The Bride Wore Black (1968) (based on the novel), directed by François Truffaut
- Mississippi Mermaid (1969) (based on the novel Waltz into Darkness), directed by François Truffaut
- Kati Patang (1970) (based on the novel I Married a Dead Man), directed by Shakti Samanta
- Seven Blood-Stained Orchids (1972) (based on the novel Rendezvous in Black), directed by Umberto Lenzi
- You'll Never See Me Again (1973), TV Movie directed by Jeannot Szwarc
- Martha (1974) (based on the story For the Rest of Her Life), directed by Rainer Werner Fassbinder
- Sex Pot, or Gun Moll (1975) (based on the story "Collared"), directed by Giorgio Capitani
- Union City (1980) (based on the story "The Corpse Next Door"), directed by Marcus Reichert
- I Married a Shadow (1983) (based on the novel I Married a Dead Man)
- Cloak & Dagger (1984) (story "The Boy Who Cried Murder"), directed by Richard Franklin
- I'm Dangerous Tonight (1990) (based on the story "I'm Dangerous Tonight"), directed by Tobe Hooper
- Mrs. Winterbourne (1996) (based on the novel "I Married a Dead Man"), directed by Richard Benjamin
- Rear Window (1998) (based on the story "It Had to Be Murder"), directed by Jeff Bleckner
- Original Sin (2001) (based on the novel Waltz into Darkness), directed by Michael Cristofer
- Four O'Clock (2006) (based on the story "Three O'Clock")
