= Jack the Ripper in fiction =

Works of fiction featuring Jack the Ripper

Jack the Ripper, an unidentified serial killer active in and around Whitechapel in 1888, has been featured in works of fiction ranging from gothic novels published at the time of the murders to modern motion pictures, televised dramas and video games.

Important influences on the depiction of the Ripper include Marie Belloc Lowndes' 1913 novel The Lodger, which has been adapted for the stage and film, and Stephen Knight's 1976 work Jack the Ripper: The Final Solution, which expanded on a conspiracy theory involving freemasons and royalty. The literature of the late Victorian era, including Arthur Conan Doyle's first Sherlock Holmes stories and Robert Louis Stevenson's Strange Case of Dr Jekyll and Mr Hyde, has provided inspiration for story-makers who have fused these fictional worlds with the Ripper.

The Ripper makes appearances throughout the science fiction and horror genres and is internationally recognised as an evil character. The association of the Ripper with death and sex is particularly appealing to heavy metal and rock musicians, who have incorporated the Ripper murders into their work.

== Literature ==
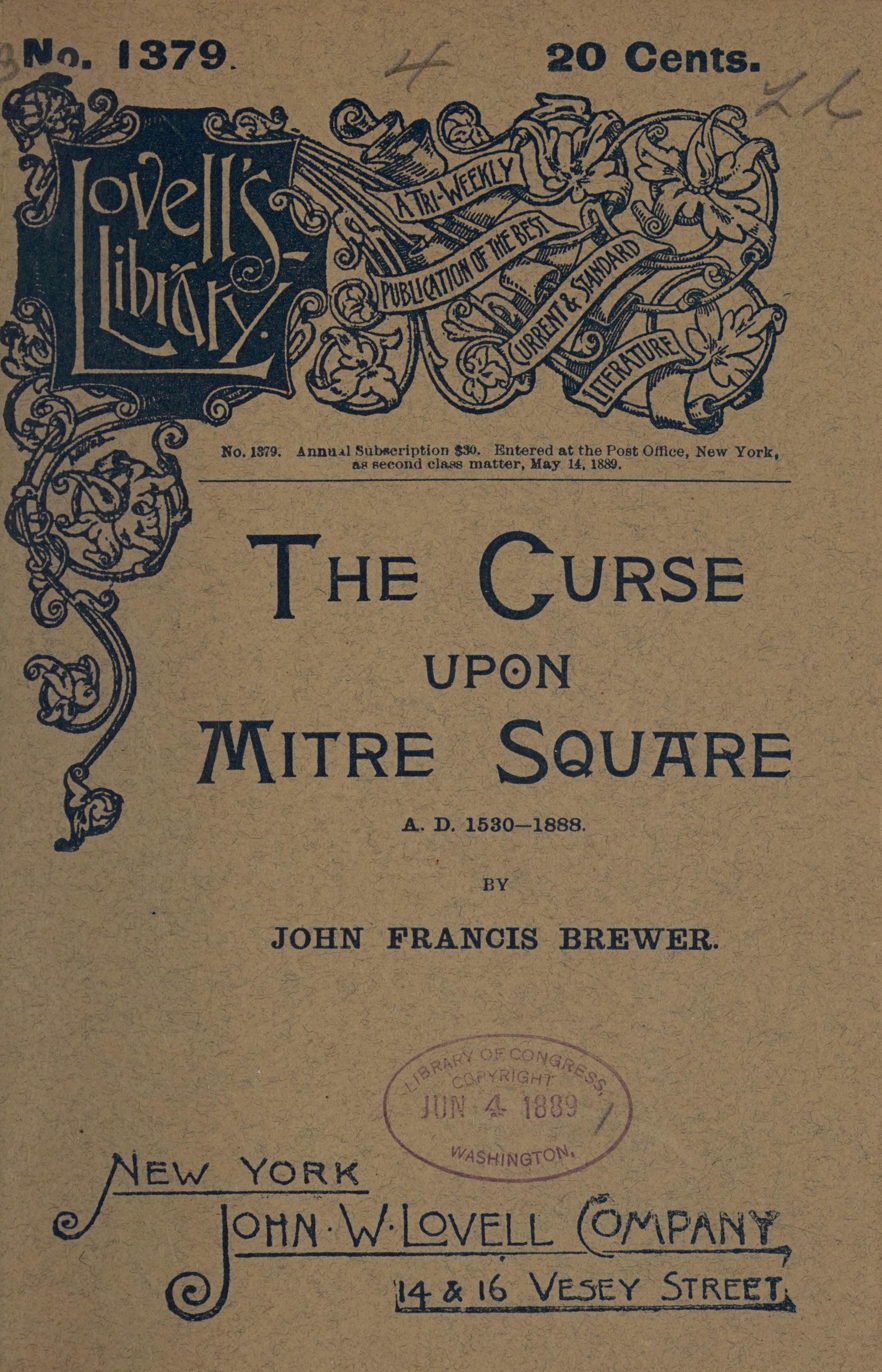
Title page of The Curse Upon Mitre Square, 1888

Works of fiction inspired by the Whitechapel murders arose immediately after the atrocities were committed. The short Gothic novel The Curse Upon Mitre Square by John Francis Brewer, which features the murder of Catherine Eddowes in Mitre Square as a key plot element, was published in October 1888. Among works by other authors, In Darkest London by Margaret Harkness, who used the pseudonym John Law, was published in 1889. Harkness depicts the Ripper as a non-Jewish slaughterman who hides among the Jews in the East End of London.

Ripper stories appealed to an international audience. A "reputedly unsavoury" anthology of short stories in Swedish, Uppskäraren ("The Ripper") by Adolf Paul, was published in 1892, but it was suppressed by Russian authorities.

The character of Sherlock Holmes has been used often in Jack the Ripper fiction. In 1907, Aus den Geheimakten des Welt-Detektivs No. 18 from German publisher Verlagshaus für Volksliteratur und Kunst featured "Wie Jack, der Aufschlitzer, gefasst wurde" (How Jack the Ripper Was Taken), in which Holmes captures the Ripper. In the 1930s the story was translated into Spanish in for Sherlock Holmes Memorias intimas del rey de los detectives No. 3, "El Destripador" (The Ripper), recently reprinted in a new book and translated into English for the first time. Cullen called the story "amusing Sherlock Holmes pastiche". Holmes was also used later in Michael Dibdin's The Last Sherlock Holmes Story (1978), Ellery Queen's A Study in Terror (1966), John Sladek's Black Aura (1974), and Barrie Roberts' Sherlock Holmes and the Royal Flush (1998) amongst others.

The first influential short story, "The Lodger" by Marie Belloc Lowndes, was published in McClure's Magazine in 1911 and novelised in 1913. It features a London couple, Mr and Mrs Bunting, who suspect that their lodger, Mr Sleuth, is a mysterious killer known as "The Avenger", clearly based on the Ripper. Whether Sleuth really is "The Avenger" is left open: the focus of the story is on the Buntings' psychological terror, which may be entirely unfounded, rather than the actions of "The Avenger". In 1927, "The Lodger" was the subject of an Alfred Hitchcock-directed film: The Lodger: A Story of the London Fog, and four other adaptations were filmed in later years.

In 1926, Leonard Matters proposed in a magazine article that the Ripper was an eminent doctor, whose son had died from syphilis caught from a prostitute. According to Matters, the doctor, given the pseudonym "Dr Stanley", committed the murders in revenge and then fled to Argentina. He expanded his ideas into a book, The Mystery of Jack the Ripper, in 1929. The book was marketed as a serious study, but it contains obvious factual errors and the documents it supposedly uses as references have never been found. It inspired other works such as the theatre play Murder Most Foul and the film Jack the Ripper. Jonathan Goodman's 1984 book Who He? is also written as if it is a factual study, but the suspect described, "Peter J Harpick", is an invention whose name is an anagram of Jack the Ripper.

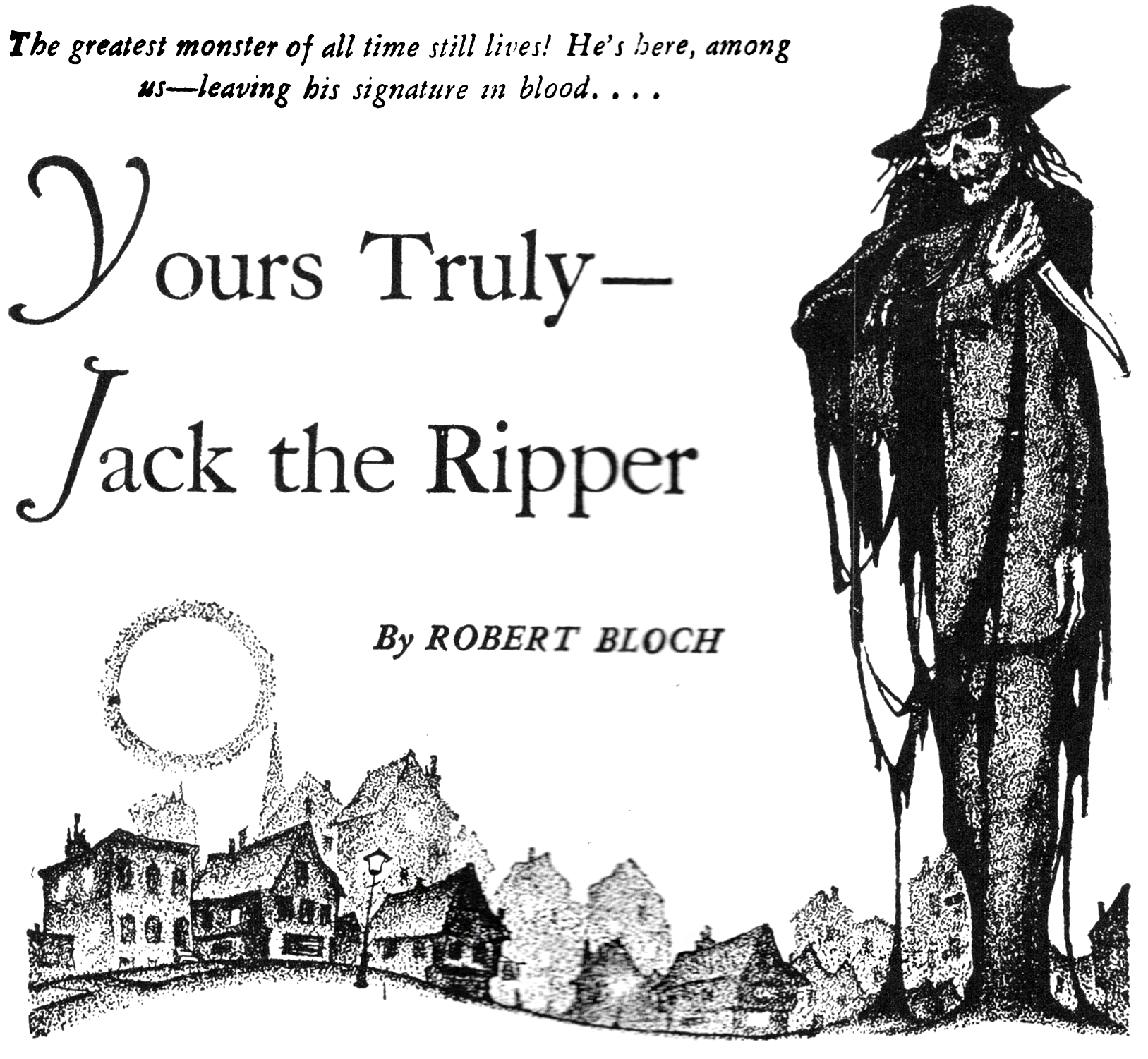
Robert Bloch's "Yours Truly, Jack the Ripper" in Weird Tales

Robert Bloch's short story "Yours Truly, Jack the Ripper" (published in Weird Tales in 1943) cast the Ripper as an eternal who must make human sacrifices to extend his immortality. It was adapted for both radio (in Stay Tuned for Terror) and television (as an episode of Thriller in 1961 written by Barré Lyndon). The science-fiction anthology Dangerous Visions (1967) featured an unrelated Ripper story by Bloch, "A Toy for Juliette", and a sequel by Harlan Ellison, "The Prowler in the City at the Edge of the World", written with Bloch's permission. Bloch's work also includes The Will to Kill (1954) and Night of the Ripper (1984).

The many novels influenced by the Ripper include:

- A Case to Answer (1947) by Edgar Lustgarten
- The Screaming Mimi (1949) by Fredric Brown
- Terror Over London (1957) by Gardner Fox
- Ritual in the Dark (1960) and The Killer (1970) by Colin Wilson
- Sagittarius (1962) by Ray Russell
- A Feast Unknown (1969) by Philip José Farmer
- A Kind of Madness (1972) by Anthony Boucher
- Nine Bucks Row (1973) by T. E. Huff
- The Michaelmas Girls (1975) by John Brooks Barry
- Jack's Little Friend (1975) by Ramsey Campbell
- By Flower and Dean Street (1976) by Patrice Chaplin
- The Private Life of Jack the Ripper (1980) by Richard Gordon
- Hasfelmetsző Jack (1981) by Gyula Hernádi
- White Chappell, Scarlet Tracings (1987) by Iain Sinclair
- The Women of Whitechapel and Jack the Ripper (1991) by Paul West
- Beasts in Velvet (1991) by Jack Yeovil
- Anno Dracula (1992) by Kim Newman
- A Night in the Lonesome October (1993) by Roger Zelazny
- Ladykiller (1993) by Martina Cole
- Savage (1993) by Richard Laymon
- The Pit (1993) by Neil Penswick
- Dan Leno and the Limehouse Golem (1994) by Peter Ackroyd
- Pentecost Alley (1996) by Anne Perry
- Matrix (1998) by Mike Tucker and Robert Perry
- Special Assignments: The Decorator (1999) by Boris Akunin
- Final Destination: Destination Zero (2005) by David A. McIntee
- The Name of the Star (2011) by Maureen Johnson
- Back to Whitechapel (2013) by Michel Moatti
- Stalking Jack the Ripper (2016) by Kerri Maniscalco
- The Cutthroat (2017) by Clive Cussler and Justin Scott
- A Knife in the Fog (2018), by Bradley Harper (featuring Arthur Conan Doyle, Joseph Bell and Margaret Harkness in the hunt for the Ripper)
- The Hypno-Ripper: Or, Jack the Hypnotically Controlled Ripper; Containing Two Victorian Era Tales Dealing with Jack the Ripper and Hypnotism (2021) by Donald K. Hartman
- The Ripper Lives (2024) by Kevin Morris. A 10-part crime fiction sequel to the official account of Jack the Ripper's murder spree.

== Theatre, opera and music theatre ==
The Ripper features at the end of Frank Wedekind's morality play Die Büchse der Pandora (1904), in which the Ripper murders Lulu, the central character. Lulu is the personification of sinful Lust who meets her comeuppance when she unwittingly flirts with the Ripper. In the original stage production, Wedekind played the part of the Ripper. The play was later adapted into the film Pandora's Box (1928, directed by Georg Wilhelm Pabst), and the opera Lulu (by Alban Berg), both of which also end with the murder of Lulu by the Ripper. It was also made into three films in 1923, 1962 and 1980 respectively, and a play Lulu by Peter Barnes premièred in 1970.

André de Lorde's Jack l'Eventreur was part of the Grand Guignol's output in Paris. Marie Belloc Lowndes' novel and short story The Lodger was adapted for the stage as The Lodger: Who Is He? by Horace Annesley Vachell. In 1917, Lionel Atwill's first role in Broadway theatre was as the title character. Phyllis Tate also based her opera The Lodger, first performed in 1960, on Lowndes' story.

Murder Most Foul by Claude Pirkis was first performed in 1948. The character of the murderer, Dr. Stanley, was taken from The Mystery of Jack the Ripper by Leonard Matters, first published in 1929. Doug Lucie's Force and Hypocrisy is based on the royal conspiracy theory of Stephen Knight.

Two British musicals, Ripper by Terence Greer and The Jack the Ripper Show and How They Wrote It by Frank Hatherley, were staged in 1973. Jack the Ripper: The Musical (1974), with lyrics and music by Ron Pember, who co-authored the book with Dennis de Marne, influenced Stephen Sondheim's Sweeney Todd: The Demon Barber of Fleet Street. In 1996, a rock opera entitled Yours Truly: Jack the Ripper with lyrics by Frogg Moody and Dave Taylor was performed and, in a break from recent practice, portrayed the Ripper as an ordinary everyday man.

Jack the Ripper: the Women of Whitechapel, by composer Iain Bell premiered at the English National Opera on March 30, 2019

== Film ==
The Lodger: A Story of the London Fog (1927), Alfred Hitchcock's film adaptation of The Lodger

Marie Belloc Lowndes' book The Lodger has been made into five films: Alfred Hitchcock's The Lodger: A Story of the London Fog (1927), The Lodger (1932), The Lodger (1944), Man in the Attic (1953) and The Lodger (2009). Hitchcock decided to cast romantic lead Ivor Novello as the title character in his version of The Lodger, with the consequence that the film company, Gainsborough Pictures, insisted on a re-write to make Novello's character more sympathetic. In a change from the original story, whether the lodger is the killer is no longer left ambivalent at the end. Instead, the lodger's strange behaviour arises because he is a vigilante, trying to catch the real killer. Novello remade the film in 1932 with a more dramatic ending, in which he throttles the killer, who is his demented brother, the "Bosnian Murderer". Novello played both roles, and Maurice Elvey directed. It was released in an abridged version as The Phantom Fiend in 1935. The 1944 version dispensed with the ambivalence of the novel and instead casts the lodger, "Slade" played by Laird Cregar, as the villain "Jack the Ripper". Unlike the earlier versions, the film is set in 1888, rather than in the year of the film's making. The 1953 version, Man in the Attic with Jack Palance as "Slade", covers much the same ground. The 2009 film casts Simon Baker as "Malcolm Slaight".

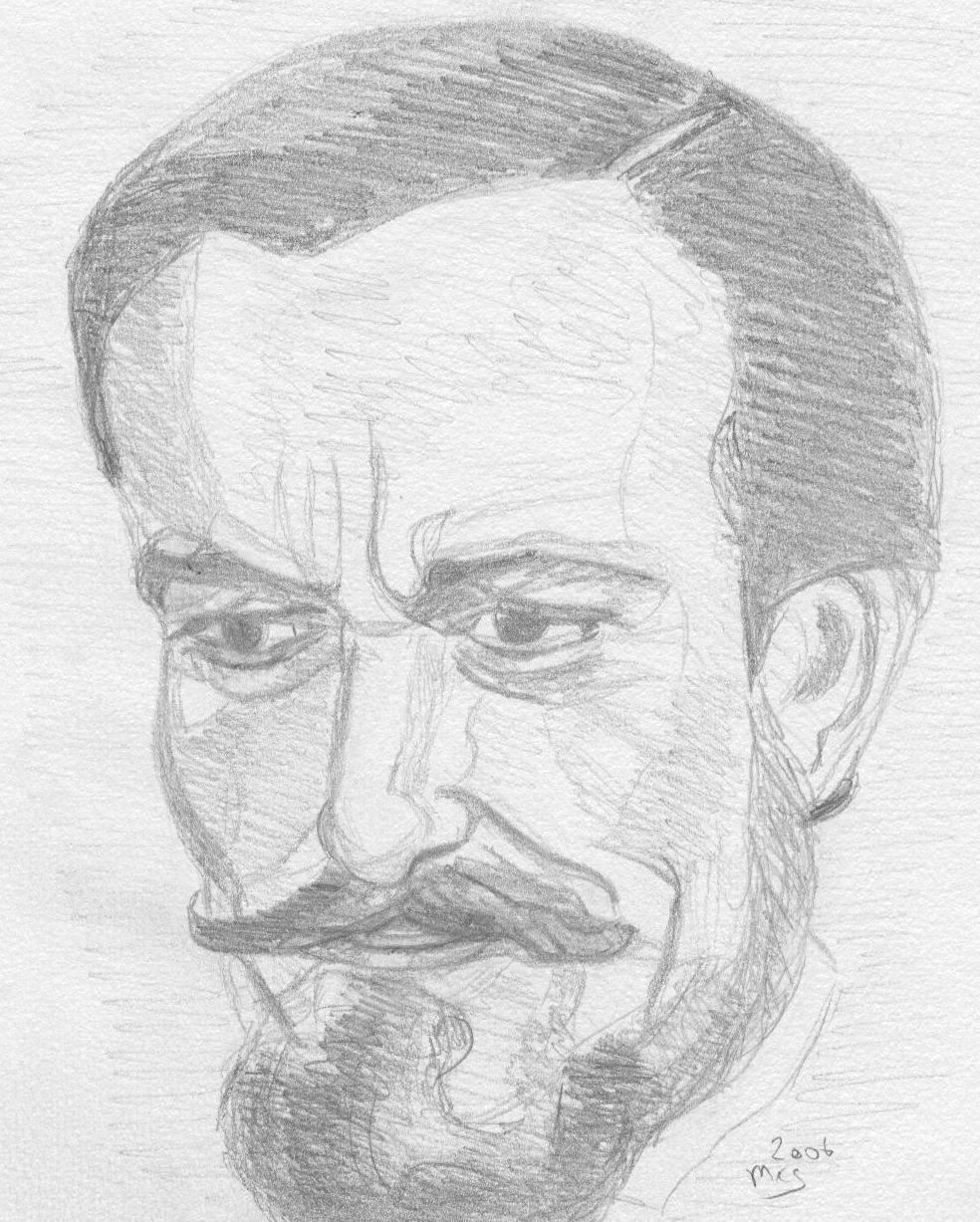
Sketch of Eric Porter as the character "Dr John Pritchard" in Hands of the Ripper. In the film, the kindly Dr Pritchard adopts the Ripper's murderous daughter.

Room to Let (1950) is similar to The Lodger story but was based on a 1948 radio play by Margery Allingham. It was one of the first horror pictures made by Hammer Film Productions. Valentine Dyall plays the lodger, "Dr. Fell", who has escaped from a lunatic asylum where he has been incarcerated for 16 years since committing the Whitechapel murders. Hammer released two Ripper-inspired films in 1971. In Hands of the Ripper, the Ripper's daughter (played by Angharad Rees) grows up to become a murderess after she sees her father kill her mother. In Dr. Jekyll and Sister Hyde, Dr. Henry Jekyll transforms into the evil predatory woman Sister Hyde and is also responsible for the Ripper murders. In Terror in the Wax Museum (1973), a murderer disguises himself as a waxwork of the Ripper.

The Veil episode "Jack the Ripper" (1958) is a made-for-television film introduced by Boris Karloff, in which a clairvoyant identifies the Ripper as a respectable surgeon whose death has been faked to cover his incarceration in a lunatic asylum. The story's basis was an 1895 newspaper report that Robert James Lees had used psychic powers to track the Ripper to the home of a London physician.

Jack the Ripper (1959), produced by Monty Berman and Robert S. Baker and written by Jimmy Sangster, is loosely based on Leonard Matters' theory that the Ripper was an avenging doctor. It borrowed icons from previously successful horror films, such as Dracula (1958) and The Curse of Frankenstein (1957), by giving the Ripper a costume of a top hat and cape. The plot is a standard "whodunit" with the usual false leads and a denouement in which the least likely character, in this case "Sir David Rogers" played by Ewen Solon, is revealed as the culprit. As in Matters' book, The Mystery of Jack the Ripper, Solon's character murders prostitutes to avenge the death of his son. However, Matters used the ploy of the son dying from venereal disease, while the film has him committing suicide on learning his lover is a prostitute. In a reversal of this formula, the German film Das Ungeheuer von London City (1964), released as The Monster of London City in 1967, casts the son as the villain with the father as the victim of syphilis.

Pandora's Box (Die Büchse der Pandora) is a 1929 German silent film directed by Georg Wilhelm Pabst based on Frank Wedekind's play about a woman, Lulu, played by Louise Brooks. Her uninhibited lifestyle leads her to walk the streets of London until she meets her end in an encounter with Jack the Ripper, played by Gustav Diessl. An earlier German film, Paul Leni's Waxworks (Das Wachsfigurenkabinett) from 1924, used a Ripper-style event in one of three dreamed vignettes. The "Jack" character was played by Werner Krauss, who had achieved enormous success with his portrayal of the evil title character in the influential early horror film The Cabinet of Dr. Caligari.

A Study in Terror (1965) and Murder by Decree (1979) both pit Sherlock Holmes against the Ripper. A Study in Terror, and its companion novel written by Ellery Queen, feature the often insane family of the Duke of Shires, with a motive provided by one of his son's becoming enamoured of a prostitute. Murder by Decree, starring Christopher Plummer as Sherlock Holmes and James Mason as Watson, follows the masonic/royal conspiracy plotline popularised by Stephen Knight, in which a royal physician is the murderer. Coincidentally, in both movies, character actor Frank Finlay plays Inspector Lestrade. In the 1997 film The Ripper, Samuel West starred as Prince Eddy, who was revealed as the Ripper, and the 1999 film Love Lies Bleeding featured Paul Rhys, Emily Raymond and Faye Dunaway. In 2001, the Hughes Brothers made the comic book From Hell into a film of the same name starring Johnny Depp as Abberline. The film again sticks to the Knight storyline, though Depp's character exhibits aspects of both Sherlock Holmes (deductive powers, drug addiction) and Robert Lees (psychic ability, foresight).

Peter Barnes' stage play The Ruling Class (1968) and its film adaptation (1972) are satires on the British aristocracy that link the Ripper to the British upper class. Jack Gurney, the mentally ill 14th Earl of Gurney (played in the film version by Peter O'Toole), spends part of the plot believing himself to be Jack the Ripper, and performs a pair of Ripper murders. The black comedy Deadly Advice (1994) features Jane Horrocks as a serial killer who imagines that she is given advice by the incarnations of famous murderers. John Mills plays Jack the Ripper as an outwardly mild-mannered hairdresser. "Just be the sort of person nobody suspects," he tells her. In an earlier black comedy, Dr. Strangelove, the antagonist is named General Jack D. Ripper, but the comparison goes no deeper. Amazon Women on the Moon is a 1987 comedy film that parodies theories of the Ripper's identity by speculating that Jack the Ripper was the Loch Ness Monster in disguise. Marcel Carné's Drôle de Drame (1937) is another parody of the Ripper, featuring Jean-Louis Barrault as an East End vegetarian who slaughters butchers in revenge for their slaughter of animals. In Shanghai Knights (2003), Jack the Ripper attempts to murder the sister of Jackie Chan's character, only to fall over the bridge as he misses his swing.

Night After Night After Night (1969) was a low-budget production that cast a high court judge (played by Jack May) as a demented copycat Ripper who attacks prostitutes in London's Soho. Throughout the 1970s and 1980s tenuous links with the Ripper case were introduced into films for commercial reasons; sexploitation horror movies Blade of the Ripper (1970), The Ripper of Notre Dame (1981) and The New York Ripper (1982) have little relation to the Ripper beyond the title. The Ripper of Notre Dame was directed and co-written by Jesús Franco, whose Jack the Ripper (1976) stars Klaus Kinski as a murderous doctor whose mother was a prostitute. What the Swedish Butler Saw (1975), in which Jack the Ripper hides in a photographic studio, is little more than softcore pornography. Thrillers Jack the Mangler of London (1973), Fear City (1984), Night Ripper (1986) and Jack's Back (1988) received poor reviews, as did the Japanese pink film Assault! Jack the Ripper. Edge of Sanity (1989) is lent "post-Psycho gravitas" by the casting of Anthony Perkins as "Dr Jekyll" and his alter-ego "Jack Hyde", but was still condemned by critics "as a tasteless exercise". The Dolph Lundgren vehicle Jill the Ripper (2000) reverses the traditional genders of victims and villains, with a female Ripper and male victims.

In Time After Time (1979), based on the novel of the same title, Jack escapes in a time machine to modern-day San Francisco and is pursued by H. G. Wells. The pursuer was originally slated to be Robert Louis Stevenson in a link to the author of Strange Case of Dr Jekyll and Mr Hyde, but he was written out in favour of Wells. In Bridge Across Time (1985), starring David Hasselhoff, Jack's spirit is transported to Arizona in a cursed stone from London Bridge. In The Ripper (1985), his spirit is instead concealed in a cursed ring. Ripper Man (1994) depicts a killer who believes himself to be the reincarnation of George Chapman, who was suspected of being Jack the Ripper after his arrest and execution for murder in 1903.

The 2002 anime film Detective Conan: The Phantom of Baker Street has a premise set around a virtual reality video game with life or death stakes where the identity of Jack the Ripper must be uncovered in order to beat the stage of the game. It's revealed that a wealthy tech developer who was involved with the game is actually a direct descendant of Jack the Ripper and committed a murder to cover up the truth about his bloodline, though ultimately he is caught and arrested and Conan and another boy beat Jack the Ripper and survive a train crash in the setting of Charing Cross Station. He is voiced by Show Hayami in the original and Todd Haberkorn in the Funimation English dub.

Released in the same year as From Hell, and consequently overshadowed by it, were Ripper and Bad Karma (re-titled as Hell's Gate). Ripper centres on psychology student Molly Keller (played by A. J. Cook) who studies serial killers. Her classmates start dying at the hands of a Jack the Ripper copycat, who targets victims with the same initials as the originals. Bad Karma is another play on the reincarnation theme with the addition of Patsy Kensit as the Ripper's female accomplice. In Red Eye (2005), the antagonist is named Jackson Rippner, a name that the protagonist, Lisa Reisert, suggests is a reference to the serial killer.

== Television ==
By the 1960s, the Ripper was established in American television as a "universal force of evil", who could be adapted to suit any villainous niche. In an episode of The Twilight Zone from 1963 entitled "The New Exhibit", Martin Balsam plays the curator of a wax museum who becomes so obsessed by five wax figures of murderers, including Jack the Ripper, that he commits murder to protect them. In the Star Trek episode "Wolf in the Fold" (1967), writer Robert Bloch reused parts of his short-story "Yours Truly, Jack the Ripper", which had already appeared as a 1961 television episode of Thriller. In the episode, the Ripper turned out to be a long-lived non-corporeal being that had committed mass murders on many worlds over centuries to generate fear, the emotion on which it fed. The entity is beamed out into space in a wide dispersal pattern, effectively disintegrating it. In the Cimarron Strip episode "Knife in the Wilderness" (1968), written by Harlan Ellison, Jack continues his work across America ending in Cimarron City where he meets his end at the hands of Indians. In the Get Smart episode "House of Max" (1970), Jack the Ripper is an animated wax dummy.

In The Sixth Sense episode "With Affection, Jack the Ripper" (1972) a man is driven mad during a paranormal experiment when he inhabits the body of Jack the Ripper. A Fantasy Island episode, also titled "With Affection, Jack the Ripper" (1980), was written by the same writer as the episode of The Sixth Sense, Don Ingalls. Lynda Day George plays criminologist Lorraine Peters who uses a time portal to confirm her suspicion that Jack the Ripper was a doctor, Albert Fell, played by Victor Buono. Fell follows her back through the portal, grabs Peters and takes her back to 1888, where the enigmatic Mr. Roarke intervenes fortuitously, and Fell dies moments later while fleeing. The name Fell is clearly lifted from Margery Allingham's 1948 radio play Room to Let. The television miniseries Jack the Ripper (1988) starred Michael Caine as Inspector Frederick Abberline. Ripper Street is a 2012 British television dramatic series set just subsequent to the murders, with the first episode seeing series protagonist Edmund Reid resolving to move on from obsession over the victims after a new case; at the end of the first season, protagonist Homer Jackson is temporarily framed as the Ripper, but is able to clear his name.

A time portal is used in "A Rip in Time" (1997), the first episode of the short-lived television series Timecop, in which a time travelling cop travels back to 1888 to catch a criminal who has killed, and displaced, Jack the Ripper. An episode of Goodnight Sweetheart also relies on a time portal to meet Jack the Ripper. In the episode "The 'Ouses in Between", Gary Sparrow gets lost in the fog in 1945 and travels down Ducketts Passage the wrong way and ends up in 1888, where he meets a performer who looks like his partner Yvonne and witnesses the aftermath of a Whitechapel murder shortly afterwards. Gary later discovers that Jack the Ripper has been using the time portal to hideout at the back of his shop, and after threatening Gary and proclaiming to make a new start in 1999, the Ripper escapes out of the front door and into the street, only to be immediately hit and killed by a bus. This leaves Gary to surmise that that was why the murders stopped so suddenly.

The Babylon 5 episode "Comes the Inquisitor" (1995) features a character named Sebastian who reveals himself at the end of the episode to be Jack the Ripper. He was abducted by the alien race known as the Vorlons in the year 1888 and made into their inquisitor so that he can test (through torture) beings who are called to lead an important cause. In the TV series Grimm, the final three episodes of the fourth season reveal that Jack the Ripper was a spirit that initially manifested over a century before the Whitechapel murders; the Jack spirit possesses series protagonist Sean Renard after a near-death experience, but the others are able to 'exorcise' Jack by shooting Renard with rubber bullets to trick Jack into thinking that Renard was being murdered. The idea of the Ripper as a supernatural entity is used again in the third season of the television series Sleepy Hollow, with the 'killer' in this case being a knife that drives its wielder to act on their darker impulses as it absorbs the blood of its victims; it is defeated when it is tricked into stabbing someone with malaria, the infection tainting the blood and thus weakening the blade.

Jack the Ripper (1973) by Elwyn Jones and John Lloyd linked with the police drama Z-Cars. The program featured Z Cars detectives Barlow and Watt, played by Stratford Johns and Frank Windsor respectively, investigating the murders from an historical perspective. In the first episode of Kolchak: The Night Stalker (1974), titled "The Ripper", reporter Carl Kolchak pursues a supernatural killer whose victims match the patterns of the original Ripper murders. The killer has superhuman strength and is invulnerable to weapons, but Kolchak dematerialises the apparently immortal being by electrocuting him. An episode of The Outer Limits titled "Ripper" (1997) was set in 1888 and starred Cary Elwes as Dr. Jack York, who kills women whom he believes are possessed by an alien entity. In an episode of Sir Arthur Conan Doyle's The Lost World, "The Knife" (2001), the explorers meet the two men blamed for the murders in Stephen Knight's royal conspiracy theory: Sir William Gull and Robert Anderson. Spike Milligan parodied the Ripper-genre in the "sublimely daft" The Phantom Raspberry Blower of Old London Town. In an episode of Friday the 13th: the Series entitled "Dr. Jack" Mickey, Ryan and Jack retrieve an antique surgeon's knife that was reputedly used by Jack the Ripper.

In the Legends of Tomorrow episode "The Great British Fake Off", Jack the Ripper is seemingly brought back to life alongside fellow criminals Bonnie and Clyde.

In the Forever episode "The Frustrating Thing About Psychopaths", Henry is involved with the investigation of the original Jack the Ripper case.

Jack the Ripper is referenced in the Hazbin Hotel episode "Storyteller", where he appears in Sir Pentious's backstory as a client of Pentious in his human life. Pentious witnessed Jack murdering a woman from his window, but could not bring himself to report Jack to the authorities out of fear, and carried guilt with him for the rest of his life.

== Art ==
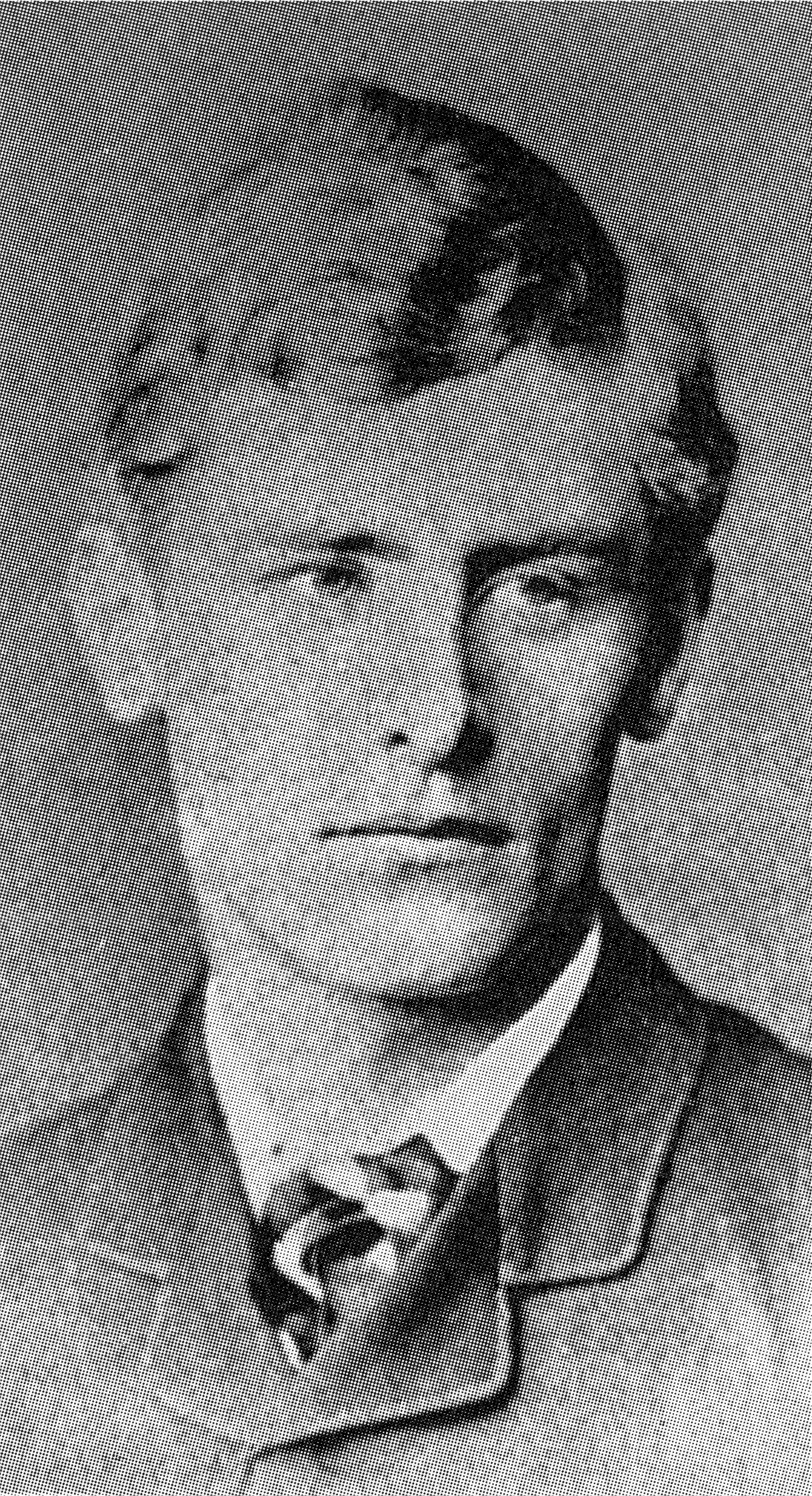
Walter Sickert, 1884

Walter Sickert was an English artist inspired by the seediness of the East End of London. His works include "Jack the Ripper's Bedroom".

== Comics ==
From Hell is a graphic novel about the Ripper case by Alan Moore and Eddie Campbell, which took its name from the "From Hell" letter supposedly written by the Ripper. It is based on Stephen Knight's conspiracy theory, which accused royalty and freemasons of complicity in the crimes and was popularised by his book Jack the Ripper: The Final Solution. In the Appendix to the graphic novel, Moore clearly states that he lends no credibility to the Knight theory and only used it for dramatic purposes. Royalty and the Ripper also featured in Blood of the Innocent by Rickey Shanklin, Marc Hempel and Mark Wheatley in 1986, and a story ("Royal Blood") in DC Comics' Hellblazer series in 1992.

Issue #100 of Marvel Comics Master of Kung Fu (1981) featured a story titled "Red of Fang and Claw, All Love Lost". In it, the Ripper was an experiment of Fu Manchu's, who escaped and hid in London. The hero fought him at the end of the story. DC Comics' Gotham by Gaslight (1989), features a Victorian era version of the superhero Batman hunting the Ripper. The two fictional worlds, both dark and gothic, complement one another and sit easily together. Jack the Ripper featured in Grant Morrison's Doom Patrol in 1989, Wonder Woman: Amazonia and Predator: Nemesis in 1997, and in a Judge Dredd story: "Night of the Ripper!". A story in the Justice League of America series fused with H. G. Wells' The Island of Dr. Moreau and features Jack the Ripper as an orangutan, while the immortal super-villain Vandal Savage has claimed to be responsible for the Ripper murders. The comic Whitechapel Freak (2001) by David Hitchcock uses Jack the Ripper as an underlying background figure in a story that focuses on a travelling freak show. The Ripper is a legless man "strapped onto the shoulders of a midget". Rick Geary's Jack the Ripper story in a 1995 volume of his A Treasury of Victorian Murder is a straighter retelling.

In the Italian comic book Martin Mystère, a vampire Richard Van Helsing discovers that the Ripper is an ancient mythical force, divided into several knives, which force their holders to kill. Van Helsing searches for and destroys the knives, including one which is destroyed by Sherlock Holmes.

=== Manga ===
In the 2006 manga Black Butler by the Japanese manga artist Yana Toboso, Jack the Ripper is portrayed as a mysterious person who had been responsible for the multiple yet common deaths of prostitutes in Victorian London. A few chapters later, it is revealed that Jack the Ripper is actually two people working together: a masquerading shinigami and a doctor of noble lineage. In Phantom Blood, the first part of the 1987 manga JoJo's Bizarre Adventure by Hirohiko Araki, the Ripper appears briefly as a minor villain after main antagonist Dio Brando turns him into a zombie and orders him to attack the protagonist. In the light novel of Fate/Apocrypha (as well as its manga and anime adaptations) by Yūichirō Higashide, Jack the Ripper is summoned as an Assassin class Servant of the Black Faction. Jack the Ripper takes the form of a small girl who in actuality is a collection of spirits of the aborted babies of prostitutes in Whitechapel, London who killed prostitutes in an attempt to return to the womb as they had never truly been born. Another interpretation of Jack the Ripper is in the light novel and manga (and later anime adaptation) Fate/Strange Fake where he is summoned as a Berserker class Servant as a being that embodies the mystery behind his legend, with the ability to take on any appearance, having no one true face. He also is portrayed in Record of Ragnarok by Shinya Umemura and Takumi Fukui, where he is chosen as a fighter in the Ragnarok Tournament, where he represents humanity and fights against Heracles. In Black Clover, Jack the Ripper is portrayed as a minor protagonist and the captain of the Magic Knight Squad known as the Green Praying Mantises. He uses a form of magic known as Severing Magic in combat, with blades protruding from his arms. He tends to argue with rival Magic Knight Captain Yami Sukehiro.

== Music ==
Link Wray's 1959 instrumental "Jack the Ripper" begins with an evil laugh and a woman's scream. These devices were also used in "Jack the Ripper" (1963), originally recorded by Screaming Lord Sutch and covered by The White Stripes, The Horrors, Black Lips, The Sharks and Jack & The Rippers. The mockumentary This Is Spinal Tap (1984) features a vignette in which the band discusses the possibility of composing a rock opera about Jack the Ripper's life, called Saucy Jack in reference to the Saucy Jacky postcard supposedly sent by the Ripper. The song actually showed up as a bonus track on the 2009 Spinal Tap album Back From the Dead.

Metal bands are particularly keen to associate themselves with the "bloodshed and sleaze" image of the Ripper. Songs entitled "The Ripper" were recorded by Judas Priest in 1976, and Praying Mantis in 1979. American deathcore band Whitechapel derived its name from the inner-city district Whitechapel in London, the location of the Jack the Ripper murders. Accordingly, the band's debut album The Somatic Defilement is a first-person narrative concept album based on Jack the Ripper. The Texan metal group Ripper went for a more direct choice of name, and vocalists with the groups Meridian and Sodomizer adopted the names Jack D. Ripper and Ripper, respectively. Gothic metalcore sextet Motionless in White released a song entitled "London in Terror" as a single from their debut album Creatures. Extreme metal band Macabre's album Murder Metal features a track called "Jack the Ripper"; the lyrics are simply the contents of the Dear Boss letter.

Songs inspired by the Ripper were recorded by artists as varied as Morrissey, Nick Cave and the Bad Seeds, The Legendary Pink Dots, Thee Headcoats, The Buff Medways and Bob Dylan. Radio Werewolf's album The Fiery Summons features "From Hell" which uses words from the letters attributed to the Ripper. Serge Gainsbourg's song "Bloody Jack" was originally released on his 1968 album Initials B.B., and was later covered by Zizi Jeanmaire.

The power metal band Falconer wrote a song entitled "Jack the Knife" for their album Grime vs. Grandeur. This song is heavily inspired by the story of Jack the Ripper and makes many references to the mythical traits associated with him. The Brazilian thrash metal band Torture Squad also recorded a song based on Jack the Ripper's legend. The song is titled "Leather Apron" and was included on the band's 2003 album Pandemonium. The song "Blood Red Sandman" Finish metal band Lordi's second album The Monsterican Dream is inspired by the story of Jack the Ripper and opens with the lyrics "They called me the Leather Apron/ They called me Smiling Jack."

In 2014, the online musical series Epic Rap Battles of History produced a video where Jack the Ripper, portrayed by Dan Bull, raps against Hannibal Lecter, portrayed by ERB co-creator EpicLLOYD.

"Respite on the Spitalfields," the closing track from Swedish metal band Ghost's 2022 album Impera, is about Jack the Ripper.

== Video games ==
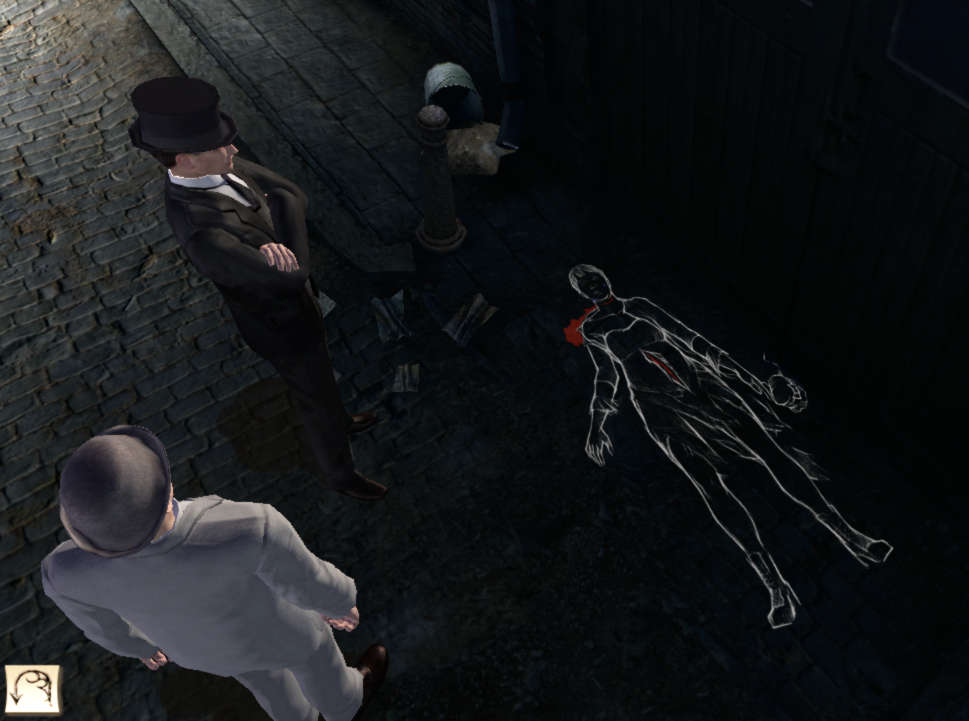
An investigation into the murder of Mary Ann Nichols in Sherlock Holmes Versus Jack the Ripper

- Jack the Ripper appeared in a self-titled 1987 text adventure game.
- The Sega platformer Master of Darkness (1992), reveals Jack to be an animated wax doll upon his defeat.
- In 1992, Jack the Ripper featured in the dungeon crawl style role-playing video game Waxworks.
- Jack is one of the historically-based characters in the World Heroes fighting game series, making his debut in World Heroes 2 Jet in 1994.
- A demon named Jack the Ripper appears in the Megami Tensei series, frequently as a low-level enemy. His most notable appearance is in the Virtual Boy game Jack Bros., where he appears as a playable character (named Jack Skelton [sic] in the English release).
- Ripper (1996) deals with a copycat serial killer in a futuristic New York City in the year 2040.
- Duke Nukem: Zero Hour (1999) is a "light-hearted gunplay romp set in Victorian London" that features Jack the Ripper.
- Jack is one of the principal villains in the horror action-adventure game Shadow Man (1999).
- Jack appears in the gothic horror platform game MediEvil 2 (2000) as a tall green monster with giant claws, long sharp teeth, and a top hat.
- The Metal Gear series character Raiden is also known as Jack the Ripper.
- In Jack the Ripper (2004), the player takes on the role of a reporter sent to cover similar murders in New York in 1901, 13 years after the Ripper's murders, who later discovers are being committed by the actual Ripper.
- Mystery in London: On the Trail of Jack the Ripper (2007), a hidden object game developed by Big Fish Games, fuses the Ripper story with Strange Case of Dr Jekyll and Mr Hyde.
- Sherlock Holmes Versus Jack the Ripper (2009) fuses the Ripper story with the fictional world of Sherlock Holmes. Jacob Levy shows up as the Ripper at the end of the game.
- In Splatterhouse, Dr. Henry West became Jack the Ripper after a series of murders he committed after becoming "bored" while in London.
- In the hidden object game Jack the Ripper: New York 1901, published by Microids (Anuman Interactive) in 2010, the player embodies James Palmer, a young journalist who reluctantly investigates the murder of two prostitutes and the possible return of Jack the Ripper.
- Assassin's Creed III (2012) features a multiplayer character called the Nightstalker, whose character bio says he is a serial killer known as "Joe the Ripper".
- The Order: 1886 (2015) features Lord Hastings, the main villain, as a vampire who is behind the Ripper killings.
- Jack the Ripper is featured in a self-titled DLC pack for Assassin's Creed Syndicate (2015), in which he is a former member of the Assassin Brotherhood and his victims were Assassins he killed while seeking revenge on his former group.
- Jack the Ripper appears in Fate/Grand Order (2015) as an Assassin class servant of the Chaldea Security Organization.
- The Ripper's murders are the subject of the 2019 fantasy adventure game Dance of Death: Du Lac & Fey.
- The Ripper, a.k.a. Jack, serves as one of the Hunters in Identity V, released by NetEase.
- Time Ripper, character in Limbus Company, released by Project Moon, is based on Jack The Ripper.

== Sports ==
In 2011 an independent minor league baseball team in London, Ontario announced that it would be known as the London Rippers, with a logo featuring "Jack Diamond", their mascot, wearing a top hat and black cape reminiscent of the appearance of Jack the Ripper in the popular imagination. The choice drew criticism from the mayor and a local women's shelter.
