= The Chianti Flask =

1934 novel

- First edition (UK)
- Author: Marie Belloc Lowndes
- Language: English
- Genre: Mystery
- Publisher: Heinemann (Britain); Longman (US)
- Publication date: 1934
- Publication place: United Kingdom
- Media type: Print

The Chianti Flask is a 1934 mystery romance novel by the British writer Marie Belloc Lowndes. It was originally published by Heinemann in London and Longman in New York. In 2021 it was republished as part of the British Library's Crime Classics series. It was one of several novel in which she realistically depicted trials along with The Terriford Mystery and Letty Lynton.

== Synopsis ==
At the assizes in the cathedral city of Silchester, the young widow Laura Dousland stands trial for the murder of her much older husband who had died from taking poison. The case has become a cause célèbre with many convinced that she has been unjustly accused. The case hinges partly on the disappearance of a flask containing the chianti her husband regularly drunk with his dinner, which the poison was likely contained in. Despite the seemingly incriminating evidence of Angelo, her husband's Italian servant, Laura is acquitted in part thanks to the testimony of the young doctor Mark Scrutton. His evidence that the dead man had been fascinated both by suicide and the effects of poison convinces the jury that he had died by his own hand.

Tormented and exhausted by the trial, Laura goes to stay at the country estate of Alice Hayward, a kindly-meaning but overbearing friend who had once employed her as a governess and had persuaded her to marry in the first place. Alice had helped organise her legal defence, but now seems to regard Laura as a social exhibit to show off to her friends. Ill and weak, Laura struggles to escape from her domineering benevolence, until the medical care of Doctor Scrutton allows her to speak freely to him. Sympathetic, he suggests she should stay at a cottage he owns on the Devon coast while she recuperates.

The solitude and her chance to living under an assumed name does wonders for Laura's health. In addition she and Mark fall rapidly in love with each other. Yet she still seems evasive and tormented by inner thoughts and refuses his offer of marriage, insisting that her notoriety as a woman tried for murder will blight his career and happiness. She even runs away in an attempt to flee to Canada where he can never find her. Reconciled again, and despite his parents' misgivings, they return to Silchester, but she cannot escape her past there.

== Bibliography ==
- Kabatchnik, Amnon. Blood on the Stage, 1925-1950: Milestone Plays of Crime, Mystery, and Detection : an Annotated Repertoire. Scarecrow Press, 2010.
- Stewart, Victoria. Crime Writing in Interwar Britain: Fact and Fiction in the Golden Age. Cambridge University Press, 2017.
- Vinson, James. Twentieth-Century Romance and Gothic Writers. Macmillan, 1982.
