= Jenny Newstead =

Jennifer or Jenny Newstead may refer to:

- Jennifer Gillian Newstead, American attorney
- Jenny Newstead (swimmer) (born c. 1967), New Zealand Paralympic swimmer

== Other ==
- Jenny Newstead (novel), 1932 novel by Marie Bellow Lowndes
