= The House of Peril =

1922 film

- Directed by: Kenelm Foss
- Written by: Horace Annesley Vachell (play); Kenelm Foss
- Based on: The Chink in the Armour by Marie Belloc Lowndes
- Produced by: H.W. Thompson
- Starring: Fay Compton; Roy Travers; Flora le Breton
- Cinematography: Jack Parker
- Edited by: John Miller
- Production company: Astra Films
- Distributed by: Astra Films
- Release date: February 1922
- Country: United Kingdom
- Languages: Silent; English intertitles

The House of Peril is a 1922 British silent drama film directed by Kenelm Foss and starring Fay Compton, Roy Travers, Flora le Breton and A.B. Imeson. It is an adaptation of the 1912 novel The Chink in the Armour by Marie Belloc Lowndes and the subsequent stage play adaptation by Horace Annesley Vachell. The film follows Sylvia Bailey, a wealthy widow who travels to a French gambling resort where she encounters assorted characters.

== Plot ==
In Deauville a German couple lure girl gamblers to a 'haunted' house and kill them for their jewels.

== Cast ==
- Fay Compton as Sylvia Bailey
- Roy Travers as Bill Chester
- A.B. Imeson as Comte de Virieu
- Flora le Breton as French Maid
- Madeline Seymour as Anna Wolsky
- Wallace Bosco as Polperro
- Nelson Ramsey as Herr Wachner
- Irene Tripod as Frau Wachner
- Blanche Walker as Maid
- George Bellamy as Gambler
- Hubert Carter as Gambler
- Jeff Barlow as Gambler
- Lewis Gilbert as Gambler
- Tom Coventry as Gambler
- Madge Tree as Gambler
