= Good Old Anna =

1915 novel

- Author: Marie Belloc Lowndes
- Language: English
- Genre: Mystery spy
- Publisher: Hutchinson; Doran (US)
- Publication date: 1915
- Publication place: United Kingdom
- Media type: Print

Good Old Anna is a 1915 mystery spy novel by the British author Marie Belloc Lowndes. It was published in the United States the following year. Lowndes was well-known for her 1913 novel The Lodger inspired by the Jack the Ripper murders. This work was written following the outbreak of the First World War. A popular novel it is set in a cathedral city in Southern England.

== Synopsis ==
German Anna has been a faithful servant of Mrs Otway for eighteen years. She unwittingly becomes a source of secret information to fellow Germans operating a spy ring. When she is confronted by the exposure of the plot, she hangs herself in remorse.

== Bibliography ==
- Ouditt, Sharon . Women Writers of the First World War: An Annotated Bibliography. Routledge, 2002.
- Potter, Jane. Boys in Khaki, Girls in Print: Women's Literary Responses to the Great War, 1914-1918. Clarendon Press, 2005.
- Vinson, James. Twentieth-Century Romance and Gothic Writers. Macmillan, 1982.
