= Man in the Attic =

1953 American horror film by Hugo Fregonese

- Theatrical release poster
- Directed by: Hugo Fregonese
- Screenplay by: Barré Lyndon; Robert Presnell Jr.
- Based on: The Lodger; 1913 novel by Marie Belloc Lowndes
- Produced by: Robert L. Jacks
- Starring: Jack Palance; Constance Smith; Byron Palmer
- Cinematography: Leo Tover
- Edited by: Marjorie Fowler
- Music by: Hugo Friedhofer
- Production companies: Panoramic Productions; Leonard Goldstein
- Distributed by: 20th Century Fox
- Release date: December 31, 1953 (San Francisco)
- Running time: 82 minutes
- Country: United States
- Language: English

Man in the Attic is a 1953 American horror film directed by Hugo Fregonese and starring Jack Palance, Constance Smith and Byron Palmer. The screenplay was by Barré Lyndon and Robert Presnell Jr. based on the 1913 novel The Lodger by Marie Belloc Lowndes which fictionalizes the Jack the Ripper killings. It had been previously filmed by Alfred Hitchcock in 1927, by Maurice Elvey in 1932, by John Brahm in 1944; it was again filmed by David Ondaatje in 2009.

== Plot ==
The full film

The story takes place in London in 1888. On the third night of the Jack the Ripper killings, Mr Slade, a research pathologist, arrives quite late at the home of Mr and Mrs Harley, looking to rent a room. Slade rents out a room and an attic, which he says he needs for his research work. Mrs Harley notices that Slade acts in a strange manner, for example turning several pictures of actresses to the wall, saying that he can feel their eyes on him. He also mentions that he is usually out late at night working, but he never explains what his research involves. Despite it being set in London, no explanation is made for Mr Slade having an American accent.

Mrs Harley's niece, Lily Bonner, arrives to stay at the house shortly afterwards; she is a beautiful stage actress and singer, recently returned from a successful stage production in Paris. Slade leaves the house for the evening, wearing an Ulster coat and carrying a small black bag, and meets Lily before her opening night in London, during Lily's performance costumes that would not be common for forty years are seen during the show, with no rationale given. At the theatre an old colleague of Lily's, Annie Rowley (who has fallen on hard times), goes to see her backstage, but she is later murdered by the Ripper. Inspector Warwick, who is investigating the murders, informs Lily and tells her that the suspect was seen wearing an Ulster coat and carrying a small black bag. The next morning, Warwick goes to see Lily again to ask a few questions, and Slade appears and gives some unorthodox opinions regarding the Ripper and says that he feels the police will never catch him. Mrs Harley's suspicions increase when she smells burning coming from Slade's attic room, and she is convinced that he is the killer when she discovers that Slade had been burning his black bag; however Mr Harley remains unconvinced, saying that he himself has hidden a small black bag he owns, as a man seen carrying one in the streets was mobbed by people suspecting him of being the Ripper.

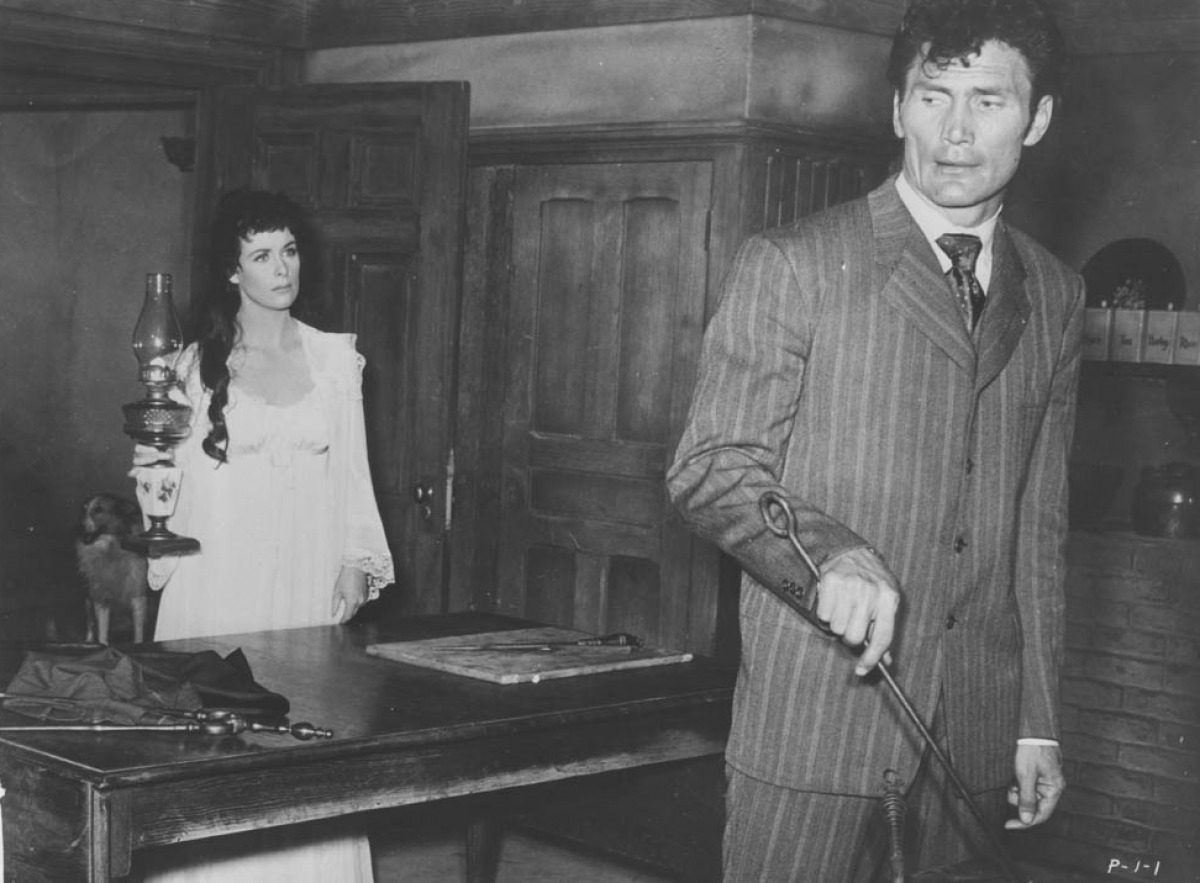
Constance Smith and Jack Palance in Man in the Attic (screenshot)

Lily is attracted to Slade, and he tells her that his mother was also an actress, that she was both beautiful and evil, and that he both loved and hated her. She behaved in an adulterous manner, and his father became an alcoholic after she left him. She ended her life as a 'woman of the streets' (i.e., a prostitute) and died on the streets in Whitechapel. Slade shows Lily a picture of his mother. Inspector Warwick then arrives to take Lily to the Black Museum, and Slade joins them, much to Warwick's displeasure. At the museum, Slade makes numerous derisive comments about the gruesome nature of the exhibits, but he seems to take a particular interest in the five pictures on the wall of the five Ripper victims, again telling Warwick that the police will never catch the Ripper.

The same evening, another woman is murdered, and later Slade is seen washing his hands in the river. During the night, Lily is woken and goes downstairs to find Slade burning some items of clothing, including his Ulster coat, which appears to have blood stains on it. Slade claims that he spilled some solution on the coat, and it might be contaminated.

Meanwhile, Warwick checks out Slade's credentials at the university hospital, and he is told that Slade is involved in research and works very late hours. Lily asks Slade to meet her backstage at the theatre that evening. Before they meet, Warwick sees if Slade's right thumbprint matches one left by the Ripper at the scene of one of his crimes, and he enlists Mr Harley's help to search Slade's room. Warwick discovers the picture of Slade's mother in a drawer, but Lily catches them and complains to Warwick that he is harassing an innocent man. Warwick later tries to match the fingerprint, but his assistant notices the picture of Slade's mother and realises that it is Anne Lawrence, the Ripper's first victim, whose picture is on the wall of the museum.

By this time, Slade has gone to the theatre to see the show, but he observes all the lustful looks on the faces of many of the men in the audience as they watch Lily dancing. He becomes agitated, and when he goes to see her backstage, he tells her that he hates other men looking at her in such a manner, and he begs her to go away with him somewhere. She resists, and he pulls a knife out of his pocket and prepares to cut her throat, but he cannot carry out the act, dropping the knife and escaping out of a window. The police, including Warwick, pursue Slade through Whitechapel, but Slade evades them and appears to drown himself in the river. However, despite Warwick and other officers searching for him in the river, his body is not found, and the possibility is left open that he may have escaped alive.

== Cast ==
- Jack Palance as Slade
- Constance Smith as Lily Bonner
- Byron Palmer as Insp. Paul Warwick
- Frances Bavier as Helen Harley
- Rhys Williams as William Harley
- Sean McClory as Constable No. 1
- Leslie Bradley as Constable No. 2
- Tita Phillips as Daisy
- Lester Matthews as Chief Insp. Melville
- Harry Cording as Detective Sgt. Bates
- Lisa Daniels as Mary Lenihan
- Lilian Bond as Annie Rowley
- Isabel Jewell as Katy
- Noble Chissell as theatre patron (uncredited)
- Ben Wright as Detective in theatre box
- Rama Bai as Lelah, Lily's maid at theatre (uncredited)

== Reception ==
The Monthly Film Bulletin wrote: "Yet another version of Mrs. Belloc Lowndes' story ... This version succeeds in creating something of the atmosphere of London in the eighties, but this is offset by over-much concentration on the stage life of Lily Bonner, much of which is irrelevant to the story. Jack Palance is a suitably sinister Ripper, but Constance Smith Seems miscast as Lily. An interesting newcomer, Lisa Daniels, brings life to the small part of Mary Lenihan ail"

Variety wrote: "It is to director Hugo Fresonese's credit that he makes so much of an old-hat tale. Direction creates a mood that almost puts the picture over big and most of the players respond to Fregonese's guidance with performances which lift many scenes to thriller pitch. ... The Robert L. Jacks production achieves excellent atmospheric values. So does Leo Tover's photography, the settings and other technical contributions."

The Radio Times Guide to Films gave the film 3/5 stars, writing: "Fox dug out its old script, had a new writer make some unhelpful alterations and turned out this modestly budgeted thriller to exploit Jack Palance's sudden rise to villainous stardom. He's too obviously sinister and the other players are weak, but the story is virtually fool-proof and director Hugo Fregonese whips up some chills and a good Victorian atmosphere. "

== See also ==
- Jack the Ripper in fiction
