= Another Man's Wife =

Another Man's Wife may refer to:

- Another Man's Wife (film), a 1924 American silent film starring Lila Lee and Wallace Beery
- Another Man's Wife (novel), a 1934 novel by British writer Marie Belloc Lowndes
