= The Lodger (novel) =

1913 novel by Marie Adelaide Belloc Lowndes

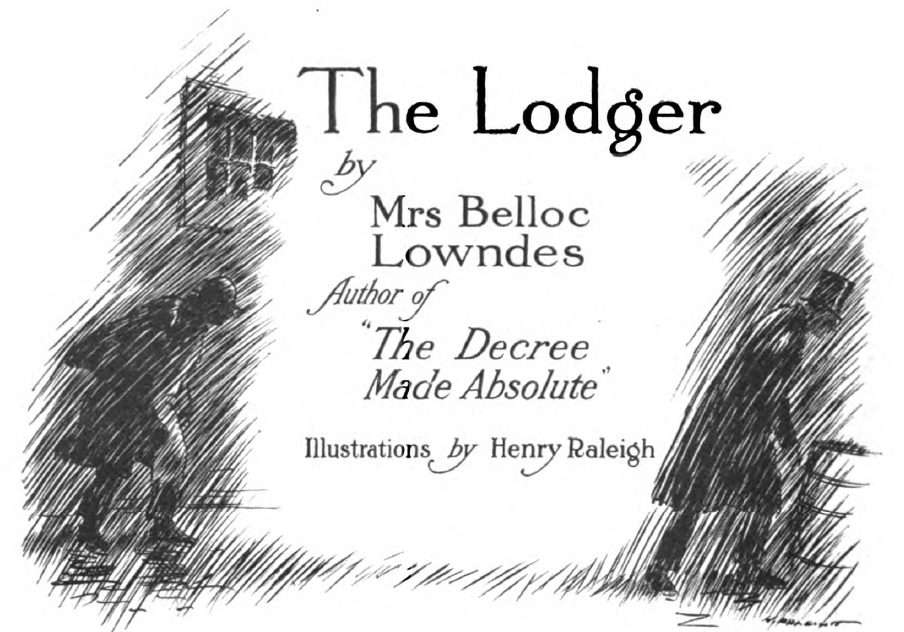
- Title card of the 1911 short story
- Author: Marie Belloc Lowndes
- Illustrator: Henry Raleigh (short story)
- Language: English
- Genre: horror fiction
- Publisher: McClure's Magazine (1911); Methuen Publishing (1913)
- Publication date: 1911 (short story); 1913 (novel)

The Lodger is a horror novel by English author Marie Adelaide Belloc Lowndes. A short story was first published in the January, 1911 edition of McClure's Magazine, in 1911. Belloc Lowndes wrote a longer version of the story, which was published as a series in the Daily Telegraph in 1913 with the same name. Later that year, the novel was published in its entirety by Methuen Publishing.

The story is based on the Whitechapel murders of 1888, committed by Jack the Ripper. While some of the traits of the novel's killer have been attributed to Forbes Winslow's findings about the original murderer, Lowndes was also influenced by the Lambeth Poisoner's physical appearance.

The book tells the story of Mr. and Mrs. Bunting, owners of a failing lodging in London, who see in Mr. Sleuth, their only guest in a long time, their chance to salvage their business. As new murders happen in the surrounding neighborhoods, the couple slowly begin to suspect their lodger might be the one responsible for them.

The Lodger is the first known novelization based on the Jack the Ripper story. The novel has been considered an example of how to write a psychological suspense due to its focus on the effects the serial killer has on the main cast of characters, instead of on the murders themselves. The novel was adapted multiple times to the cinema and radio, including Alfred Hitchcock's first thriller film, The Lodger: A Story of the London Fog.

== Background ==
In one of her memoirs, Belloc Lowndes mentions what spurred her to write a short story about Jack the Ripper. While at a dinner, she sat near a man who told her about two people who had served his father. A butler and a maid who, after marrying, decided to open a lodging-house. The man told Lowndes about how this couple believed the killer had spent a night in their lodging before committing "the most horrible of his murders". After listening to the story, she decided it could work as the basis for a "striking short story".

Although it is known for being one of the first novelizations of the murderer known as Jack the Ripper, the story was also based on another murderer, Dr. Neill Cream, also known as the Lambeth Poisoner. The crimes committed by Dr. Neill Cream happened around the same time as the ones by Jack the Ripper, and the appearance of Mr. Sleuth is based on that of the Lambeth Poisoner. Edmund Pearson described Cream as "roaming about the dark streets of London, grotesque in his high hat and sober professional clothes, but venomous as a puff-adder."

According to Laura Marcus, many of the aspects that Belloc Lowndes used to develop the lodger in her story are very similar to the details given by L. Forbes Winslow in his publication about Jack the Ripper. Both Lowndes' and Winslow's murderers shared the following characteristics: "religious obsession, hatred of women, days spent writing Biblical commentary, silent nocturnal exits and entrances."

Both Winslow, who was consulted on the investigation, and Walter Sickert, a painter who some suspected to be the Ripper, had theorized in the years following the murders that he was a lodger. Jack the Ripper scholar Stephen P. Ryder believes that, due to the similarity and prominence of those stories, the idea of the murderer as a lodger quickly became an urban myth. Due to its notoriety, many authors had begun writing penny dreadful "Ripper-themed" stories in the following years, as they were somewhat profitable. Lowndes' short story borrows elements from the penny dreadful style but was the first time the concept of the Ripper as a lodger was presented in fiction.

== Plot ==
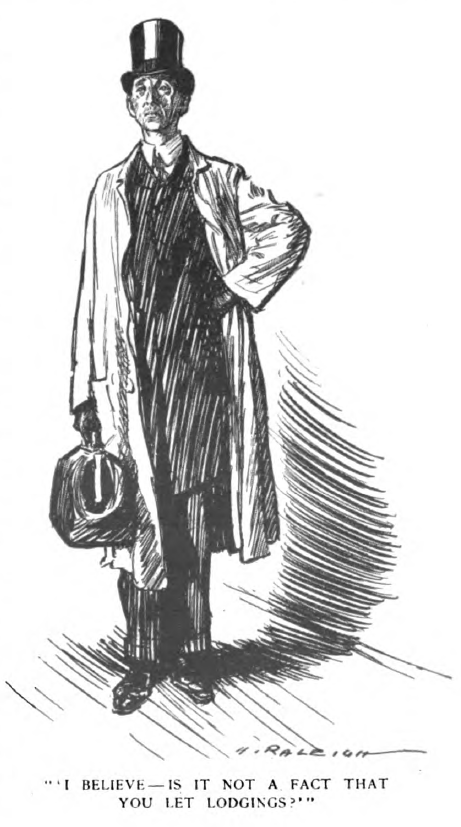
Illustration of the lodger by Henry Raleigh, 1911

The story is told from the point of view of Ellen Bunting, a former maid, and her husband and a former butler, Mr. Bunting, who together are trying to manage a lodging. Struck by bad luck at their first attempt, as an epidemic develops near where their first lodging is, they decide to try one more time, with their remaining savings. When they are close to giving up on this endeavour, and barely able even to buy food, Mr. Sleuth appears and decides to stay there. He pays a month upfront and asks not to be disturbed while conducting his experiments.

Mrs. Bunting likes Mr. Sleuth and his quiet ways, but becomes increasingly suspicious of him as he arrived on the same day that a gruesome murder happened, and, while he is staying there, several more women are killed by a mysterious man. She notices that Sleuth only leaves after it is dark and his experiments consist of burning his clothes. However, she is horrified at her own suspicions, and does not want to think ill of Mr. Sleuth. She also fears that if her suspicions are true, she and her husband will be blamed for sheltering him, so, despite her growing fear, she lets him stay.

Mr. Bunting, having received some extra money after working as a waiter for an expensive party, invites his daughter from a previous marriage, Daisy, to visit them for a few days during her 18th birthday. That night, while going home, he finds Mr. Sleuth on his way to the lodging. After a brief conversation, he passes Mr. Sleuth to open the lodging's front door and accidentally touches Mr. Sleuth's pocket. The butler becomes suspicious after realizing it was drenched in blood, and even more so when two more bodies are found nearby the next morning.

On the day of Daisy's birthday, both Mr. and Mrs. Bunting leave the house at the same time. When they meet each other and realize they left Daisy alone with Mr. Sleuth, they run back and, arriving there, the girl tells them about the conversation she had with the lodger, during which he asked if he could go to Madame Tussauds with Daisy and Ellen. While in the museum, they see the Head Commissioner of Police and other officers leaving. Believing he was betrayed by Mrs. Bunting, Mr. Sleuth threatens her and disappears.

== Major themes ==
=== Gender ===
Although it is accepted that gender is an important aspect of Lowndes' work, the views are somewhat divided. Virginia Macdonald, in the Twentieth-century Crime and Mystery Writers chapter about Lowndes, notices a pattern in Lowndes' stories of women who are turned from respectable to murderous due to vices or other psychological problems. For Mary Jean DeMarr, the main thematic impulse of The Lodger is Mrs. Bunting's "willful self-deception". Scholars Laura Marcus and Joseph Kestner, both responsible for writing "full-length academic texts on Marie Belloc Lowndes," consider the British writer to be "decidedly feminist."

According to literature professor Elyssa Warkentin, having the main female character be the one person capable of solving the mystery behind the murders that eluded thousands of officers and detectives, is a "suggestion that the problem of male violence cannot be solved within the confines of male-dominated systems of knowledge". For her, the novel gives agency to women in a situation of violence and misogyny. Marcus also comments, in one of her studies about The Lodger, how Mrs. Bunting is "more of a detective figure than Joe, the police detective."

Warkentin, in her analysis, notes that, although the reader sees the perspective of several characters throughout the story, the one that is most prevalent is Mrs. Bunting's, who is also the first of them to realize that the new lodger might be the killer that the Scotland Yard is after. Mrs. Bunting is also treated as an agent in the novel, instead of being an object or victim, which Marcus sees as a manifestation of Lowndes' feminism in The Lodger.

In an analysis of three of Lowndes' works, "focusing primarily on [...] novels about murderesses", Ellen Turner comments on how Mr. Sleuth, the murderer, is feminised by the author, being described as "a strange, queer looking figure of a man". For Turner, this shows that murder is strongly "associated with the feminine" in Lowndes' works.

=== Self-protection ===
When Mr. Sleuth first appears, the Buntings see in him their salvation from financial ruin. After some time, Mrs. Bunting becomes suspicious of her lodger, as she realizes he could be the one behind the murders. Even though she knows this, Mrs. Bunting avoids talking to the police, as she is afraid her association with the murderer could lead to being ostracized by society. Not only that, throughout the novel she shows a constant fear of the police, who, for the Buntings, possess an almost unnatural power.

Even though Mrs. Bunting is portrayed as a "respectable, nineteenth century woman of her class," she is free of any ethical dilemma when she chooses to protect Mr. Sleuth from the police.

== Publication history ==
The Lodger was initially published in 1911 as a short story in the last edition of McClure's Magazine accompanied by sketches from Henry Raleigh. Afterwards, Marie Belloc Lowndes wrote a novel by the same name, based on the short story, which was published in 1913 in a serialized format in the Daily Telegraph. Later in the same year, it was published by Methuen as a book.

== Literary significance and reception ==
The Lodger is considered to be both the first and the best fictional adaptation of the Jack the Ripper story. According to Lowndes in one of her memoirs, the book had sold over a million copies after a few decades of its publication. When originally released in the United States, writers Ernest Hemingway and Gertrude Stein helped advertise it, with Hemingway calling The Lodger and The Chink in the Armour "splendid after-work books, the people credible and the action and the terror never false." Edmund Pearson, a contemporary who also wrote books based on "true crimes", called Lowndes' book "the best novel about murder written by any living author."

A review published in The Observer in 1913 said "[Belloc Lowndes] brings to the making of a mystery a literary sense and an imagination that puts life into the tale and into the readers." They commented on the quality of the characters, calling them "real people", and also praised the atmosphere that Lowndes managed to create. A New York Times review commented that the book's clue about the murderer is "nothing more than a clever 'blind'" to the real mystery to be solved, which "testifies to the skill of Mrs. Belloc-Lowndes as a writer of mystery stories."

Anthony Hilfer called it "[t]he classic novel of guilty bystanders" in his book, The Crime Novel: A Deviant Genre. Lowndes was later praised for how the story focuses not on the murderer or their targets, but instead on the people affected by them, such as the Bunting family.

The Lodger, which has spawned several adaptations throughout the years, is considered today to be one of Lowndes' most widely known works. But, despite the praise she received for the novel, very few academic studies were published about it until a more recent revival.

The 1950s urban legend The Hook follows the plot dynamics of the horror novel The Lodger. Though the two narratives have little in common, the literary scholar Christopher Pittard notes that both are built upon a "threefold relationship of crime, dirt, and chance... Such a reading also implies a reconsideration of the historical trajectory of the urban legend, usually read as a product of postmodernist consumer culture."

== Adaptations ==
=== Cinema and television ===
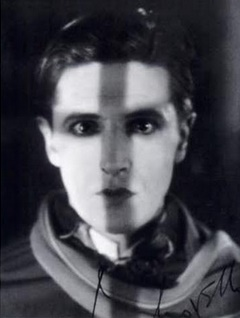
Ivor Novello as the lodger in Hitchcock's 1926 adaptation.

The first adaptation of Belloc Lowndes novel was a silent movie directed by Alfred Hitchcock, which was also Hitchcock's first movie released to the general public. It was released in the United Kingdom in 1926 with the title The Lodger: A Story of the London Fog, and in the United States in the following year titled The Case of Jonathan Drew.

While the plot is very similar to the novel, Hitchcock had to change the script to have the Buntings' daughter, Daisy, as the lodger's love interest due to pressure from the studio. Another major change made at the request of the studio was having the lodger, played by Ivor Novello, shown as innocent for all the deaths. While Hitchcock had originally planned to maintain the killer's identity a mystery, "a star of Novello's standing could not end up as a pathological killer." His character is instead searching for the killer.

In 1932, another movie based on the story, also starring Novello in the main role, was released. Directed by Maurice Elvey and titled The Phantom Fiend in the United States, it was considered a closer adaptation to the original than that of Hitchcock. In 1944 another movie was released, this time by John Brahm. This version differs from the original by having the lodger's victims as actresses instead of sex workers. Hugo Fregonese directed a 1953 adaptation of The Lodger called Man in the Attic, starring later Oscar-winner, Jack Palance..

The novel was also adapted to the television. Armchair Mystery Theatre, a companion show of Armchair Theatre, had an episode in its third season called "The Lodger", which aired in 1965 in the United Kingdom. In 1967, Wolf Dietrich directed a TV movie in Germany called Der Mieter with Pinkas Braun as the murderer.

In 2009 David Ondaatje directed a new adaptation called The Lodger and starring Alfred Molina, Hope Davis and Simon Baker.

=== Radio ===
In 1940, Hitchcock and Herbert Marshall worked together to create a radio version of Belloc Lowndes' 1913 novel. This was the first episode of a new series called Suspense, which was created to "bring 'something new and different to radio'." Four years later, another episode of Suspense based on the book was broadcast, this time with Robert Montgomery in the main role. Montgomery reprised his performance in 1948, when the series broadcast a one-hour episode based on The Lodger.

In 1946, Ida Lupino and Vincent Price participated in a Hollywood Star Time episode, and in 1947 Mystery in the Air broadcast an episode starring Peter Lorre.

BBC Radio 4 released a new version adapted by Stephen Sheridan and produced by David Blount in 2003, which significantly changed the ending of the story.

=== Other media ===
The novel was also adapted to the opera, with a production composed by Phyllis Tate which premiered in 1960.

== Sources ==
- Pittard, Christopher (2011). Purity and Contamination in Late Victorian Detective Fiction. Routledge. ISBN 978-0-754-66813-8.
