= The Lodger (1944 film) =

1944 American horror film by John Brahm

- Theatrical release poster
- Directed by: John Brahm
- Screenplay by: Barré Lyndon
- Based on: the 1913 novel The Lodger by Marie Belloc Lowndes
- Produced by: Robert Bassler
- Starring: Merle Oberon; George Sanders; Laird Cregar
- Cinematography: Lucien Ballard
- Edited by: J. Watson Webb Jr.
- Music by: Hugo Friedhofer
- Production company: 20th Century Fox
- Distributed by: 20th Century Fox
- Release date: January 19, 1944 (United States)
- Running time: 84 minutes
- Country: United States
- Language: English
- Budget: $869,300
- Box office: $3 million

The Lodger is a 1944 American horror film about Jack the Ripper, based on the 1913 novel of the same name by Marie Belloc Lowndes. It stars Merle Oberon, George Sanders, and Laird Cregar, features Sir Cedric Hardwicke, and was directed by John Brahm from a screenplay by Barré Lyndon.

Lowndes' story had previously been filmed by Alfred Hitchcock in 1927 as a silent film, The Lodger: A Story of the London Fog, and by Maurice Elvey with sound in 1932 as The Lodger. It was remade again in 1953 by Hugo Fregonese as Man in the Attic, starring Jack Palance, and again in 2009 by David Ondaatje.

== Plot ==
Slade, a serial killer, is a lodger in a 19th-century family's London home. So is a singer, Kitty Langley, who definitely has caught Slade's eye. The man of the house, Robert Bonting, is recovering from a nervous breakdown caused by business reverses. So the family is initially blind to Slade's increasingly peculiar behavior, such as turning all portraits of women to face the wall and burning odds and ends in the middle of the night.

Women are being brutally killed in the Whitechapel district. Scotland Yard is investigating, and a detective, John Warwick, begins to cast his suspicions in Slade's direction. Kitty, meanwhile, has also developed an attraction to Slade. When Jennie, a former actress who asked Kitty for a handout just before being murdered in her own home is discovered, the investigation increasingly revolves around Kitty's circle of associates.

Slade goes to see Kitty perform at a cabaret. Watching her and her troupe perform a flesh-revealing Can-Can dance brings out his worst instincts. He goes backstage afterward, rants that his brother had taken his own life due to a failed association with an actress; and tries to make her his next victim. But Warwick's men get there just in time. Unwilling to be taken into police custody, Slade crashes through a window and leaps to his death in the river.

== Cast ==
- Merle Oberon as Kitty Langley (singing voice was dubbed by Lorraine Elliott)
- Laird Cregar as Mr. Slade, the lodger
- George Sanders as Inspector John Warwick
- Sir Cedric Hardwicke as Robert Bonting
- Sara Allgood as Ellen Bonting
- Aubrey Mather as Superintendent Sutherland
- Queenie Leonard as Daisy, the maid
- Doris Lloyd as Jennie
- David Clyde as Sergeant Bates
- Helena Pickard as Annie Rowley

=== Uncredited ===
- Ted Billings as News Vendor
- Cyril Delevanti as Stagehand
- Stuart Holmes as King Edward
- Olaf Hytten as Harris
- Billy Bevan as Bartender
- Charlie Hall as Music Hall Entertainer("I Wish I Was Single Again")
- Frederick Worlock as Police Commissioner Sir Edward Willoughby
- Lumsden Hare as Dr. Sheridan
- Anita Sharp-Bolster as Barfly who Borrows Concertina

== Reception ==
=== Box office ===
The film made a profit of $657,700.

=== Critical ===
The New York Times gave the film a mixed review: "If The Lodger was designed to chill the spine—as indeed it must have been, considering all the mayhem Mr. Cregar is called upon to commit as the mysterious, psychopathic pathologist of the title—then something is wrong with the picture. But, if it was intended as a sly travesty on the melodramatic technique of ponderously piling suspicion upon suspicion (and wrapping the whole in a cloak of brooding photographic effects), then The Lodger is eminently successful." Variety wrote: "With a pat cast, keen direction, and tight scripting, 20th-Fox has an absorbing and, at times, spine-tingling drama". TV Guide rated it 4/5 stars, and wrote: "Cregar is absolutely chilling in this Jack the Ripper tale, perhaps the best film made about Bloody Jack."

== See also ==
- List of American films of 1944
