= The Lodger (2009 film) =

2009 film by David Ondaatje

- Directed by: David Ondaatje
- Written by: David Ondaatje
- Based on: The Lodger; 1913 novel by Marie Belloc Lowndes
- Produced by: David Ondaatje; Michael Mailer
- Starring: Alfred Molina; Rachael Leigh Cook; Hope Davis; Simon Baker
- Cinematography: David A. Armstrong
- Edited by: William Flicker
- Music by: John Frizzell
- Production company: Stage 6 Films
- Distributed by: Samuel Goldwyn Films
- Release date: January 23, 2009
- Running time: 95 minutes
- Country: United States
- Language: English

The Lodger is a 2009 mystery/thriller film directed by David Ondaatje and starring Alfred Molina, Hope Davis and Simon Baker. It is based on the 1913 novel The Lodger by Marie Belloc Lowndes, filmed previously by Alfred Hitchcock in 1927, by Maurice Elvey in 1932, by John Brahm in 1944, and as Man in the Attic (1953) directed by Hugo Fregonese.

== Synopsis ==
The film follows two parallel stories, one being about a troubled detective (Molina) who plays a cat-and-mouse game with an unknown killer and the other being about an emotionally disturbed landlady and her relationship with an enigmatic "lodger" (Simon Baker).

== Plot ==
The story opens with a brutal murder of a prostitute taking place on Sunset Boulevard, in Hollywood. The detective in charge is Chandler Manning and his rookie assistant is Street Wilkenson. They initially believe this is a stand-alone murder, but when a second prostitute is killed, the medical examiner says the two murders are not only eerily similar to two murders that took place 7 years prior, but they are exact copies of the first two Jack the Ripper murders in 1888 London. Since Detective Manning had caught who he thought was the murderer of the previous crimes, they now realize the wrong person was tried, prosecuted and executed. Manning is also dealing with a wife who tried to commit suicide, and his estranged daughter, Amanda, who blames him for the attempt.

In a second story line, a couple is looking to rent their guest house when a passerby comes to the door and says he wishes to rent the room. Ellen Bunting takes the lodger, Malcolm Slaight, to see the room and he immediately agrees to rent the guest house but says several times he cannot be disturbed since he is a writer, and needs complete quiet. When Ellen's husband, Joe, asks her why the "for rent" sign has been removed, she says she has rented the room but the lodger needs to be left alone. Joe does not believe she has rented the guest house because he never sees anyone coming or going from the premises, and because he knows his wife has episodes where she imagines things and needs to take medication. Ellen begins to have feelings for the lodger and she goes out of her way to see him. She catches him in their kitchen late one night and when he says he was looking for scissors, she reaches across him to pick up and hand him a pair, but he just takes them and walks out.

The ripper copycat then commits two more murders, but this time he is seen by a witness who describes a man with a long black coat and a black bag. Manning notices a garbage can near the murder site with BATTY written on it; when he opens the lid, he finds a pair of bloody underwear that belong to one of the victims. Wilkenson is suspicious of how he knew there was something in the can, but Manning references the previous ripper murders and how they found a portion of clothing from one of the victims. Manning then goes to the old case files for the man he had previously arrested for the murders 7 years ago, and takes evidence of a letter that was written to him after the arrest had taken place. While there, he pulls his gun on the evidence clerk and tells him to stop following him.

Ellen continues to make contact with the lodger by taking him breakfast and tea - anything to be near him. On one visit she sees a pair of her husband's boots drying on a newspaper, and Malcolm states they got muddy when he walked in the garden. The lodger then kisses her, and Joe can be seen in the house, beginning to head for the guest house. As he is nearing, Ellen opens the door and walks out with the boots, saying she was cleaning them. She sees a picture in the newspaper of a footprint taken of boots that is linked to the crime, and puts the sole of the boot on top of the picture, but then does nothing despite realizing that they are the same size. Joe, getting tired of what he thinks is Ellen's hallucination, forces her next door and tells her he doesn't want to hear another word about the imaginary lodger if they see no one in the room. When the door opens, no one is there and Ellen is left sitting in the rain while Joe disgustedly walks back to the house.

Manning and Wilkenson begin investigating the suspects that are known to frequent the area where the killings are taking place, and this brings them into contact with Joe Bunting. They visit the Bunting home, and Ellen acts suspiciously when she takes them to see the guest house. They leave to get a warrant to search the place, but Manning is pulled into a meeting with the Captain of the precinct and the Mayor. Since he threatened the evidence clerk while at the station, they feel this - combined with his personal life - is causing him to lose touch with reality and they place him on suspension. Det. Wilkenson is left trying to solve the case without the assistance of Manning and when he sees Manning's name on a suspect list, he goes to the Captain. The Captain believes Manning is delusional and psychotic, and not only committed the murders 7 years ago but is obsessed with Jack the Ripper and is committing murders again, just so he can solve them. Manning realizes that the Captain suspects him and observes the Captain and officers searching his apartment, and that they have taken the letter he had stolen from evidence.

Ellen, believing Malcolm is guilty but not caring, goes to the guest house to wipe it clean of any evidence he was ever there, and disturbs a cabinet, causing a gush of red liquid that appears to be blood to spill from it. Malcolm walks in then and confronts her about why she is there and says a bottle of red ink must have spilled. Ellen goes to the house to wash her hands and Malcolm walks in, carrying a black bag. Ellen - realizing he is either about to leave, or worse, kill her - says she will not tell anyone what she has seen and will do anything to protect him. Malcolm appears to let her take the bag from his hand. Meanwhile, Joe is at work and finds that the police have been there to talk to him and becomes agitated.

Manning goes to Wilkenson to ask him for help, as there has been yet another murder, leaving only one woman left to be killed before the murderer disappears. Wilkenson agrees and they get the warrant they need to search the Bunting's guest house but initially find nothing. Manning then realizes the cabinet has not been opened and when they do, in it are maps with red ink and prints on them. Wilkenson and the Captain both look suspiciously at Manning because they believe he is planting evidence, and Wilkenson cuffs Manning to escort him in, though they also place a call to pick up Joe at work. When the police arrive, they realize Joe is no longer there.

We see Manning's daughter, Amanda, leaving her dorm at college and being observed by someone in the shadows. Manning notices two maps at the scene, one of London during the Ripper murders and another of Hollywood, marking the current killing. He sees that the marks on the map line up for the past murders, except now there is a new mark on the Hollywood map that does not line up, and it is exactly where his daughter's dorm is. He talks Wilkenson into removing the cuffs and they head off to grab Amanda, but she is walking down the street, headed to a local venue. She is being followed by someone in a long black coat, wearing boots and begins to run.

She stops and turns when she hears the sirens but the ripper has moved to the side and attempts to attack her when she stops. Manning sees the attack and runs off after the ripper, while Wilkenson stays with Amanda. The ripper is chased into the Bunting home where Manning, the Captain and several officers enter. We see Ellen in the living room, sitting in a rocking chair, wielding a long, curved knife. She drops the knife when they enter and go upstairs; they find Joe has been cut up very badly but is still alive.

The ending provides an explanation for the killings; Ellen became schizophrenic by the death of her baby in child birth 8 years ago, and this sent her into a spiral of killing. She also made up the imaginary life that her son lived, and the lodger, who was a romantic interest for her. Though the police and the press accept that this is the truth and Ellen is the killer, Manning does not believe it and the last scene is Malcolm, at a new residence in Santa Monica, looking for new lodgings.

== Cast ==
Storyline 1:

- Alfred Molina as Chandler Manning, the troubled detective
- Rachael Leigh Cook as Amanda Manning, his estranged daughter
- Mel Harris as Margaret Manning, his suicidally depressed wife
- Shane West as 'Street' Wilkenson, his rookie partner
- Philip Baker Hall as the Police Chief
- Rebecca Pidgeon as Dr. Jessica Westmin, an FBI profiler assisting with the case
- Lancer Dean Shull as the Internal Affairs Officer who suspends Chandler Manning from his duties.

Storyline 2:

- Hope Davis as Ellen Bunting, the emotionally disturbed landlady
- Donal Logue as Joe Bunting, her easily angered husband
- Simon Baker as Malcolm Slaight, the mysterious stranger who becomes their "lodger"

== Release ==
The film premiered on January 23, 2009, in limited release in New York and Los Angeles, and was released on DVD on February 10, 2009.

== Reception ==
The film drew negative reviews from most critics. The consensus on Rotten Tomatoes is "An accomplished cast can't save a derivative suspense flick that manages to confuse and bore rather than thrill." It received a 21% rating on Rotten Tomatoes based on 24 critic reviews. Metacritic (which uses a weighted average) assigned The Lodger a score of 17 out of 100 based on 8 critics, indicating "overwhelming dislike".

Writing in Variety, John Anderson stated "The Lodger seems intended to leave its audience as baffled as the London police were in 1888. Never mind that it rains constantly along Ondaatje’s Sunset Strip, or that the melodrama arrives like a monsoon. What needed to be a taut, structurally sound psycho-thriller instead malfunctions from the start." Joe Neumaier wrote in the New York Daily News, "If you think you're tired of tedious thrillers, this B-movie has a cast that looks like they slept right through it... Filled with second-rate Brian DePalma twists, noirishly blurred lights and usually solid actors mouthing potboiler brine, The Lodger resembles bottom-shelf '80s dreck." Robert Abele wrote in the Los Angeles Times, "This strained, empty effort doesn't work as homage or update, and in its darkly violent sensibility has neither the glamour of Brian De Palma's referential nightmares or even the narrative fuel of the serial-killer-obsessed procedurals that dominate TV." Ben Walters attacked the film in Time Out, writing " the real crime is the travesty writer-director David Ondaatje perpetrates on Alfred Hitchcock".
