= The Lodger (1932 film) =

1932 film

- Directed by: Maurice Elvey
- Written by: Miles Mander; Paul Rotha; H. Fowler Mear; Ivor Novello (uncredited)
- Based on: The Lodger; 1913 novel by Marie Belloc Lowndes
- Produced by: Julius Hagen
- Starring: Ivor Novello; Elizabeth Allan
- Cinematography: Basil Emmott; William Luff; Sydney Blythe (uncredited)
- Edited by: Jack Harris
- Music by: W.L. Trytel (uncredited)
- Production company: Julius Hagen Productions
- Distributed by: Woolf & Freedman Film Service (UK)
- Release date: 8 September 1932
- Running time: 85 minutes
- Country: United Kingdom
- Language: English

The Lodger (U.S. title: The Phantom Fiend) is a 1932 British thriller film directed by Maurice Elvey, and starring Ivor Novello, Elizabeth Allan, and Jack Hawkins. It was written by Miles Mander, Paul Rotha, H. Fowler Mear and Ivor Novello (the latter uncredited) based on the 1913 novel The Lodger by Marie Belloc Lowndes. The film was released in the United States in 1935 in truncated form, as The Phantom Fiend.

The novel was also filmed by Alfred Hitchcock in 1927 (also starring Novello); by John Brahm in 1944; by Hugo Fregonese, as Man in the Attic, in 1953; and by David Ondaatje in 2009.

== Plot ==
Mr and Mrs Bunting rent one of their rooms to Michel Angeloff, a foreigner. A number of murders have been committed and the police are investigating. The culprit is believed to be a foreigner, and the description matches Angeloff. The Buntings' daughter Daisy falls in love with Angeloff, and believes in his innocence when he is arrested as a suspect. He escapes from custody and goes to meet Daisy in a park, arriving in the nick of time to save her from the real murderer – his own brother.

== Cast ==
- Ivor Novello as Michel Angeloff / "The Bosnian Murderer"
- Elizabeth Allan as Daisy Bunting
- A. W. Baskcomb as George Bunting
- Barbara Everest as Mrs Bunting
- Jack Hawkins as Joe Martin
- Shayle Gardner as Detective Snell
- Peter Gawthorne as Lord Southcliff
- Kynaston Reeves as Bob Mitchell
- Drusilla Wills as Mrs Coles
- Anthony Holles as Silvano
- George Merritt as Commissioner
- Andreas Malandrinos as Rabinovitch

== Reception ==
Film Weekly wrote: "Novello is inclined to be a little mannered in his acting, but for the most part it would be difficult to improve on his performance. A. W. Baskcomb extracts every particle of comedy from the part of Mr. Bunting without once being out of character, and Elizabeth Allan is very good as his daughter, Daisy. Maurice Elvey's direction, from an ingenious scenario, is perhaps the best thing he has ever done."

Kine Weekly wrote: "A very good mystery thriller, a smooth adaptation of Mrs. Belloc Lowndes's famous story, which escapes from the conventional, yet furnishes first-class popular entertainment. The action is not exactly fierce, but exceedingly good characterisation and intelligent treatment build up interest and suspense with logical precision, while the ending, although slightly incredible, has a real element of surprise, which gets it over."

Variety wrote: "The Phantom Fiend tries hard kidding the audience into thinking it's a shocker. With the exception of a couple minutes toward the end, it offers a first rate cure for Insomnia. Treatment by the adaptors, of the Belloc Lownes yarn enhances its basic dullness and implausibility to the nth degree, while the heavy handed, obvious direction serves as a running mate for the lip-pursing of Ivor Novello in the leading role. This British quickie can be tagged on to the lower end of a double-header but with apologies."
