= What Timmy Did =

1921 novel

- Author: Marie Belloc Lowndes
- Language: English
- Genre: Melodrama
- Publisher: Hutchinson (Britain); Doran (US)
- Publication date: 1921
- Publication place: United Kingdom
- Media type: Print

What Timmy Did is a 1921 novel by the British writer Marie Belloc Lowndes.

== Bibliography ==
- Vinson, James. Twentieth-Century Romance and Gothic Writers. Macmillan, 1982.
