= Ivy (1947 film) =

1947 film by Sam Wood

- Magazine advertisement
- Directed by: Sam Wood
- Screenplay by: Charles Bennett
- Based on: The Story of Ivy by Marie Belloc Lowndes
- Produced by: William Cameron Menzies
- Starring: Joan Fontaine; Patric Knowles; Herbert Marshall; Richard Ney
- Cinematography: Russell Metty
- Edited by: Ralph Dawson
- Music by: Daniele Amfitheatrof
- Production companies: Sam Wood Productions; Inter-Wood Productions
- Distributed by: Universal Pictures
- Release date: June 26, 1947 (New York City)
- Running time: 99 minutes
- Country: United States
- Language: English

Ivy is a 1947 American crime drama film directed by Sam Wood and starring Joan Fontaine, Patric Knowles, Herbert Marshall and Richard Ney. It written by Charles Bennett, based on the 1927 novel The Story of Ivy by Marie Adelaide Belloc Lowndes. It was distributed by Universal Pictures. The film was entered into the 1947 Cannes Film Festival.

The song "Ivy", written to promote the film by Hoagy Carmichael but not included in the soundtrack, has become a jazz standard. The film was later adapted in 1951 for the radio version of the NBC drama anthology show Screen Directors' Playhouse, with George Marshall directing in place of Wood, who had died two years after the film's completion in 1949, and Fontaine reprising the title role as Ivy Lexton.

== Plot ==
In Edwardian England, Ivy Lexton is a woman with a taste for the finer things in life. Despairing of her husband Jervis's poor prospects, Ivy sees an opportunity in wealthy Miles Rushworth and is determined to have him, despite being married and having the additional obstacle of her affair with the infatuated Dr. Roger Gretorex.

Miles is attracted to her, but—after one brief kiss in the dark—he apologizes and resists any further involvement, because she is married. Ivy tries unsuccessfully to persuade her husband to divorce her, then poisons him and tries to pin the blame on Roger. Inspector Orpington is called in to investigate Jervis's mysterious death.

Ivy's plot to frame Roger succeeds, and he is so devoted to her that he eventually confesses to the murder. The Inspector still suspects foul play and tells Jervis' mother that he believes Roger is sacrificing himself for Ivy. The Inspector turns up new evidence; Roger's lawyer tells Ivy that Roger is free. Miles who has been briefed on Ivy's nefarious actions, walks out on her. Distraught, she flees the apartment and falls down an empty elevator shaft to her death.

== Cast ==
- Joan Fontaine as Ivy Lexton
- Patric Knowles as Roger Gretorex
- Herbert Marshall as Miles Rushworth
- Richard Ney as Jervis Lexton
- Cedric Hardwicke as Inspector Orpington
- Lucile Watson as Mrs. Gretorex
- Sara Allgood as Martha Huntley
- Henry Stephenson as Judge
- Rosalind Ivan as Emily
- Lillian Fontaine as Lady Flora
- Molly Lamont as Bella Crail
- Una O'Connor as Mrs. Thrawn
- Isobel Elsom as Miss Chattle
- Alan Napier as Sir Jonathan Wright
- Paul Cavanagh as Doctor Berwick
- Lumsden Hare as Doctor Lanchester
- Norma Varden as Joan Rodney
- C. Montague Shaw as Stevens

== Critical reception ==
The staff of Variety magazine said of the film, "William Cameron Menzies' production has an off-the-beaten path design that helps generate the melodramatic mood desired. Sets are small and players and settings are lensed from close range. Cast performances are good, but reflect directorial obviousness."

== Box office ==
The film lost money for Universal.
