= The Christine Diamond =

1940 novel

- First edition
- Author: Marie Belloc Lowndes
- Language: English
- Genre: Drama
- Publisher: Hutchinson (UK); Longman (US)
- Publication date: 1940
- Publication place: United Kingdom
- Media type: Print

The Christine Diamond is a 1940 novel by the British writer Marie Belloc Lowndes.

== Bibliography ==
- Vinson, James. Twentieth-Century Romance and Gothic Writers. Macmillan, 1982.
