= The Story of Ivy =

1927 novel

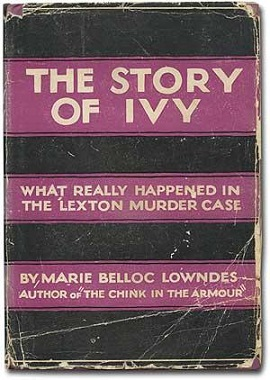
First edition (US)

The Story of Ivy is a 1927 melodramatic novel by the British writer Marie Belloc Lowndes. It portrays Ivy Jervis, a beautiful but ambitious young woman whose frustrations with her impoverished husband push her to murder him, and let the blame fall on another.

It was published by Heinemann in the UK and by Doubleday Doran in the US the following year.

A 19 November 1927 review in The Spectator commented "This is one of Mrs. Lowndes's best stories. It has a strong vein of mystery and sensation, and yet gives us a variety of true characterization and some shrewd commentary on modern life."

== Film adaptation ==
In 1947 the story served as the basis for a film Ivy directed Sam Wood and starring Joan Fontaine in the title role. The production is a costume film set during the Edwardian Era and with some changes from the original plot to conform to the requirements of the production code.
