= Letty Lynton (novel) =

1931 novel by Marie Belloc Lowndes

- 1976 edition by Hutchinson
- Author: Marie Belloc Lowndes
- Language: English
- Genre: Drama
- Publisher: Heinemann (Britain); Cape and Smith (US)
- Publication date: 1931
- Publication place: United Kingdom
- Media type: Print

Letty Lynton is a 1931 novel by the British writer Marie Belloc Lowndes. It is loosely inspired by the case of Madeleine Smith, a young woman accused of murder.

== Adaptation ==
In 1932 it was adapted by Hollywood studio MGM into the film Letty Lynton directed by Clarence Brown and starring Joan Crawford, Robert Montgomery and Nils Asther.

== Bibliography ==
- Goble, Alan. The Complete Index to Literary Sources in Film. Walter de Gruyter, 1999.
- Vinson, James. Twentieth-Century Romance and Gothic Writers. Macmillan, 1982.
