= Jenny Newstead (novel) =

1932 novel

- First edition (US)
- Author: Marie Belloc Lowndes
- Language: English
- Genre: Melodrama
- Publisher: Heinemann (Britain); Putnam (US)
- Publication date: 1932
- Publication place: United Kingdom
- Media type: Print

Jenny Newstead is a 1932 melodramatic suspense novel by the British writer Marie Belloc Lowndes. It is based on the story of the serial killer George Joseph Smith.

== Bibliography ==
- Vinson, James. Twentieth-Century Romance and Gothic Writers. Macmillan, 1982.
