= The Chink in the Armour =

1912 novel

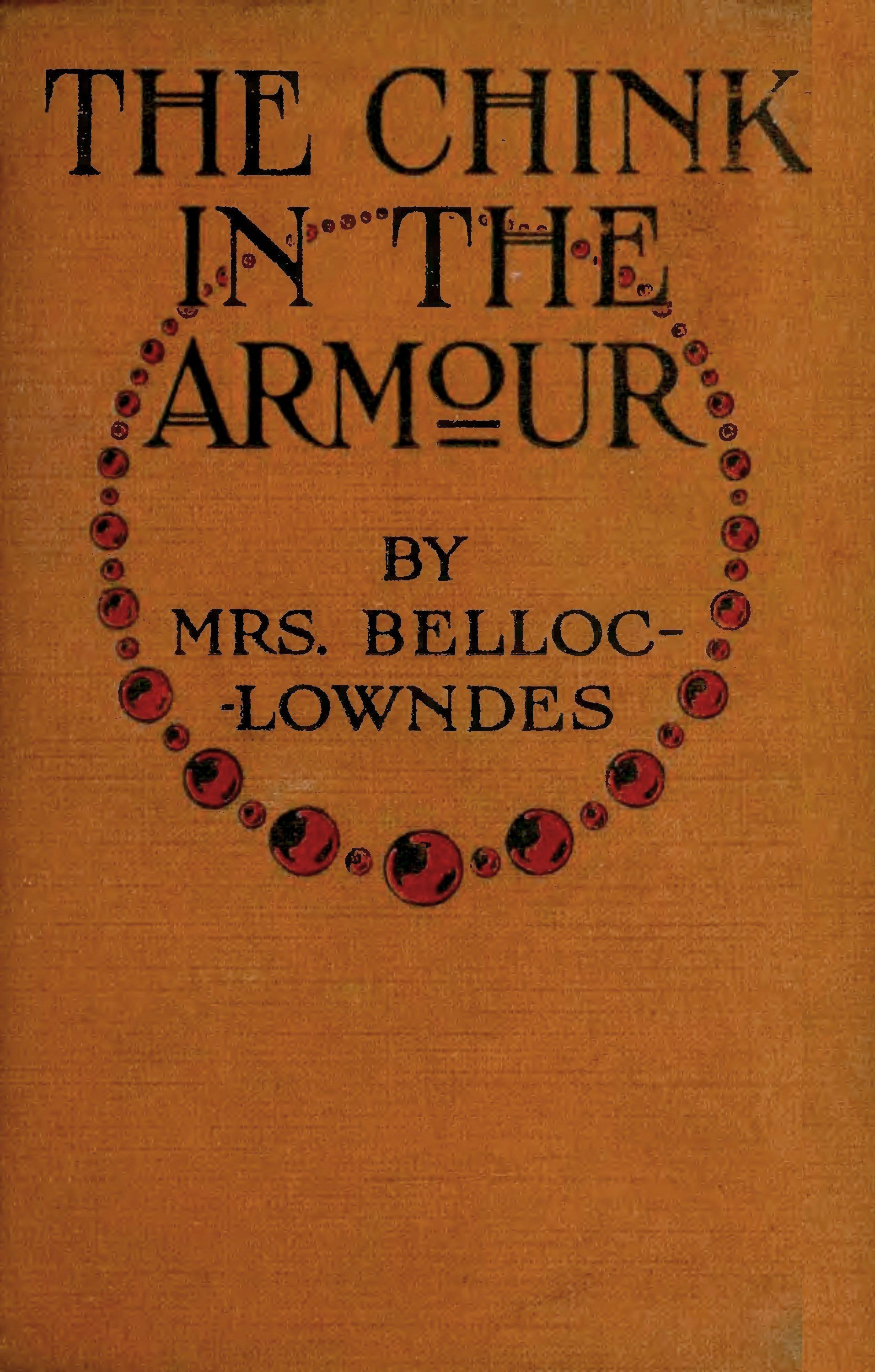
- Author: Marie Belloc Lowndes
- Language: English
- Genre: Drama
- Publication date: 1912
- Publication place: United Kingdom
- Media type: Print
- Pages: 216-352

The Chink in the Armour is a 1912 psychological thriller and mystery novel by the British writer Marie Belloc Lowndes.

In 1922, it was made into a British silent film The House of Peril directed by Kenelm Foss and starring Fay Compton.
