= Another Man's Wife (novel) =

1934 novel

- First edition (UK)
- Author: Marie Belloc Lowndes
- Language: English
- Genre: Drama
- Publisher: Heinemann (UK); Longman (US)
- Publication date: 1934
- Publication place: United Kingdom
- Media type: Print

Another Man's Wife is a 1934 novel by the British writer Marie Belloc Lowndes.

== Bibliography ==
- Vinson, James. Twentieth-Century Romance and Gothic Writers. Macmillan, 1982. Google Books
