= The Terriford Mystery =

1924 novel

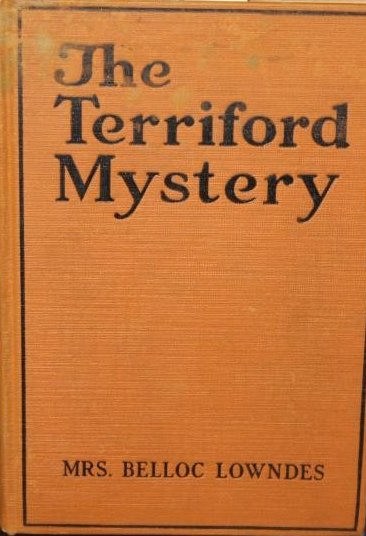
- Author: Marie Belloc Lowndes
- Language: English
- Genre: Mystery crime
- Publisher: Hutchinson; Doubleday (US)
- Publication date: 1924
- Publication place: United Kingdom
- Media type: Print

The Terriford Mystery is a 1924 mystery crime novel by the British author Marie Belloc Lowndes. It was one of several of her novels which depict a courtroom trial for murder.

== Synopsis ==
A celebrated amateur cricketer's local team host the touring Australian cricket team for their opening warm-up match and narrowly beat them. Soon afterwards comes the sudden death of his invalid wife, through whom all almost all his wealth comes from. He finds himself growing close to the local physician's niece and shortly after announcing their engagement, an anonymous poison pen letter suggests that he murdered his wife so he could remarry. Scotland Yard and the Home office dismiss the letter written in bitterness by another woman who had hopes on marrying him, but he insists on being fully cleared. When the body is exhumed it is clear his wife had died through arsenic poisoning. He is arrested pending his trial for murder at the assizes and it falls to his fiancée to try and find the vital evidence that will clear him.
