= The Lodger (opera) =

Opera by Phyllis Tate

- Opera by Phyllis Tate
- Librettist: David Franklin
- Based on: The Lodger, 1913 novel by Marie Belloc Lowndes
- Premiere: 16 July 1960; Royal Academy of Music, London

The Lodger is an opera in two acts composed by Phyllis Tate. The libretto is by David Franklin, after the 1913 novel of the same name by Marie Belloc Lowndes. The opera was commissioned by the Royal Academy of Music, with a grant from the William Manson Fund, and the premiere took place there on 16 July 1960.

== Writing history ==
The opera took three years to write, and the planning and libretto-writing took longer than the composing. Tate started with a synopsis, and after Franklin had turned it into a libretto, she acknowledged that "his great experience as a singer at Glyndebourne and Covent Garden has been of enormous help to me." Originally, the first scene would have lasted for eight hours, but "we managed to whittle it down so that the whole opera lasts a mere two and a quarter hours now."

== Roles ==
Roles, voice types, premiere cast
Role	Voice type	Premiere cast, 16 July 1960 Conductor: Myers Foggin
George Bunting	bass	William McCue
Paper Boy	treble or tenor	
Emma Bunting	mezzo-soprano	Jean Evans
Policeman	bass-baritone	
Daisy	soprano	
Three cockneys	baritone, mezzo-soprano, bass	
The Lodger	high baritone	David Bowman
Joel Chandler	tenor	John Wakefield
Chorus (soprano, mezzo-soprano, tenor, bass)

== Synopsis ==
Emma Bunting, a poverty-stricken landlady in Victorian London, takes in a gentlemanly lodger who gives financial help to her and her husband George. Slowly it emerges that the lodger is not what he seems, and his religious mania indicates mental and other problems. As the tension mounts and the atmosphere becomes more sinister, Emma agonises over whether to report him to the authorities. The lodger's identity is revealed as Jack the Ripper.

== Performance history ==
After the premiere at the Royal Academy of Music, the opera was broadcast on the BBC Third Programme on 2 February 1964, with Johanna Peters (Emma), Joseph Ward (the Lodger), Alexander Young (Joel Chandler), Owen Brannigan (George), conducted by Charles Groves. The broadcast was recorded at home on professional equipment by Richard Itter of Lyrita Records for his private archive, and released on CD in 2015.

The first professional performance took place on 10 March 1965 at the St Pancras Festival. The Royal Northern College of Music performed the opera in 1970.

The first German performance took place at the Stadttheater Bremerhaven in June 2018 in a German translation by Steffan Piontek and staged by Sam Brown, conducted by Ektoras Tartanis.

== Critical opinion ==
After the premiere, the editor of Opera magazine noted the "highly competent professionalism and the natural feel for the stage that the composer displays" with the composer able "to write music that can create both atmosphere and tension; how to write music that can be sung (though some of the conversational passages could have moved at a slightly faster pace): how to use her orchestra both economically and effectively". He also praised "the very adroit libretto provided by David Franklin".

Lewis Foreman describes the opera as dramatically effective, "with its fog-and-gaslight atmosphere, and a divided set showing two rooms simultaneously. All this is lightened by a series of jolly choruses and the idiosyncratic use of polkas and waltzes. It remains the composer's most considerable operatic achievement."
