= Marie Belloc Lowndes =

English novelist (1868–1947)

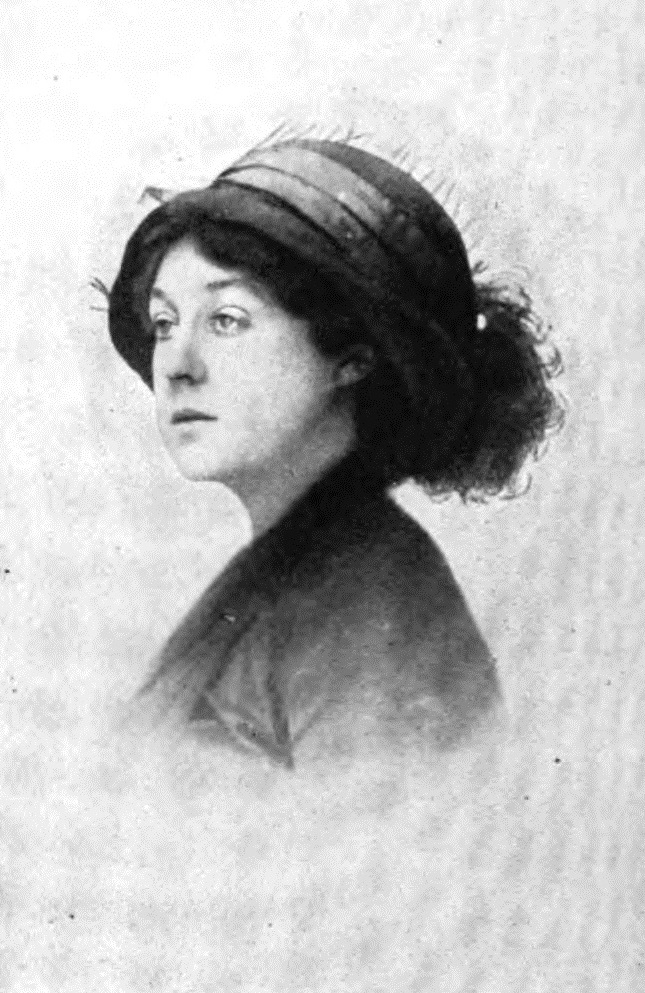
- Born: Marie Adelaide Elizabeth Raynor Belloc; 5 August 1868; Marylebone, London, England
- Died: 14 November 1947 (aged 79); Eversley Cross, Hampshire, England
- Occupation: Writer
- Spouse: Frederick Sawrey A. Lowndes (m. 1896; died 1940)
- Children: 3
- Mother: Bessie Rayner Parkes
- Relatives: Hilaire Belloc (brother)

Marie Adelaide Elizabeth Rayner Lowndes (née Belloc; 5 August 1868 – 14 November 1947) was an English novelist, and sister of author Hilaire Belloc. Active from 1898 until her death, she had a reputation for combining exciting incidents with psychological interest in her books. Four of her works were adapted for the screen: The Chink in the Armour (1912; adapted 1922), The Lodger (1913; adapted several times), Letty Lynton (1931; adapted 1932), and The Story of Ivy (1927; adapted 1947). The Lodger was also adapted as a 1940 radio drama and a 1960 opera.

== Personal life ==
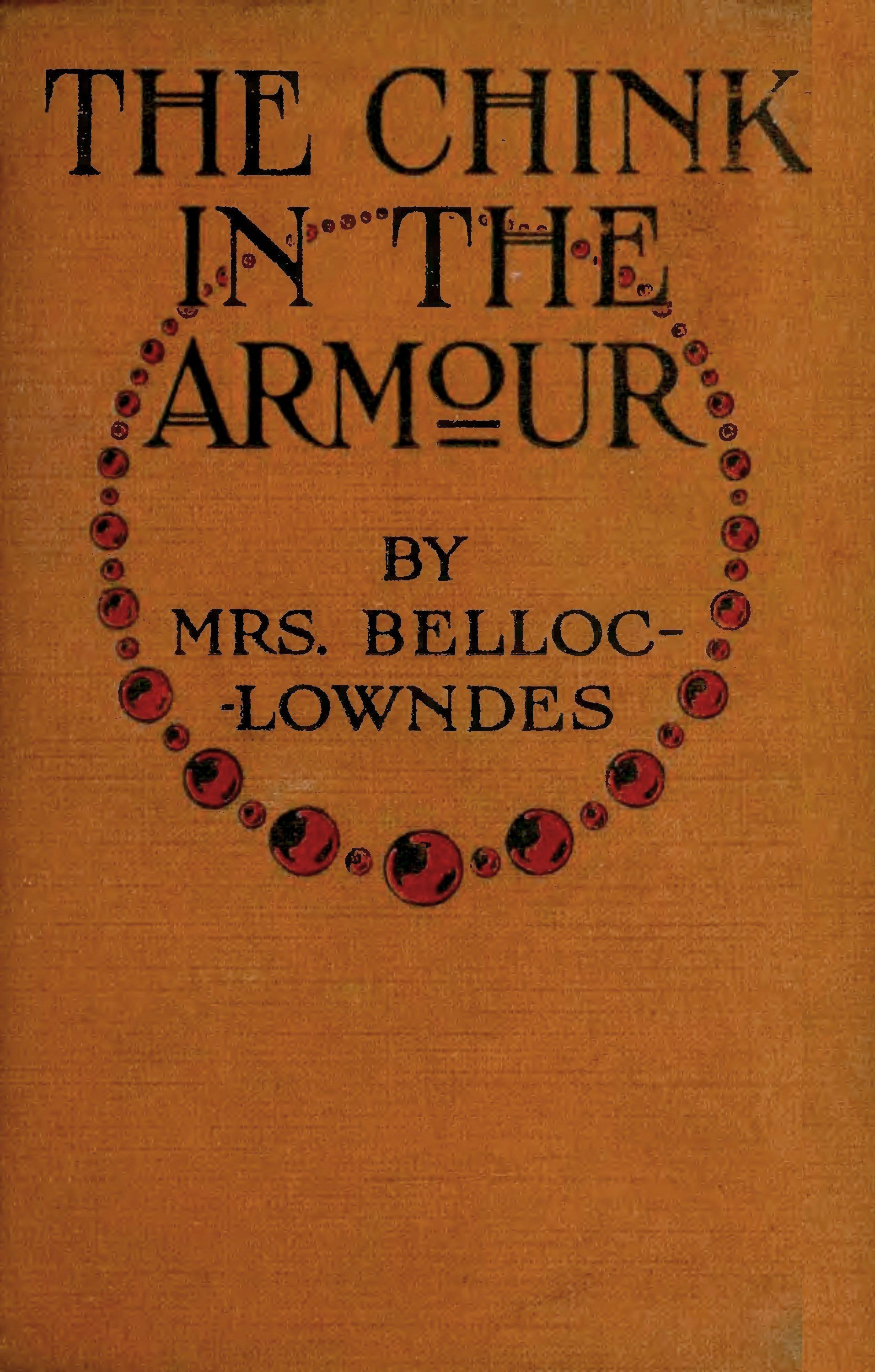
Cover of The Chink in the Armour

Born in George Street, Marylebone, London, and raised in La Celle-Saint-Cloud, France, Belloc was the only daughter of French barrister Louis Belloc and English feminist Bessie Parkes. Her younger brother was Hilaire Belloc, whom she wrote of in her last work, The Young Hilaire Belloc (published posthumously in 1956).

Belloc's paternal grandfather was the French painter Jean-Hilaire Belloc, and her maternal great-great-grandfather was the theologian/philosopher Joseph Priestley. Her father died in 1872 when she and her brother were very young. Her mother spent 53 years as a widow and died in 1925.

In 1896, Belloc married Frederick Sawrey A. Lowndes (1868–1940), a journalist. They had one son and two daughters, the elder of whom married the Earl of Iddesleigh. Unlike her brother she was a strong supporter of the women's suffrage movement. In 1913 she was the President of the Women Writers' Suffrage League which included men as members. She got on with her brother but it was remembered that he lent her £350 in 1914 to pay off her debts.

== Career ==
She published a biography, H.R.H. The Prince of Wales: An Account of His Career, in 1898. A legacy given to her husband provided £2,000 which was used to support them while she tried to make a living from writing. She wrote about seventy novels, reminiscences and plays at the rate of one per year until 1946. An early novel was The Heart of Penelope, which was published in 1904.

She produced over forty novels in all — mainly mysteries, well-plotted and on occasion based on real-life crimes, though she herself resented being classed as a crime writer. She created the French detective Hercules Popeau, maybe before Agatha Christie's creation of Belgian detective Hercule Poirot. Popeau appeared in two novels and a series of short stories, creating some confusion when both had works called "The Labours of Hercules".

In the memoir, I, Too, Have Lived in Arcadia, published in 1942, she told the story of her mother's life, compiled largely from old family letters and her own memories of her early life in France. A second autobiography Where love and friendship dwelt appeared in 1943.

Ernest Hemingway praised her insight into female psychology, revealed above all in the situation of the ordinary mind failing to cope with the impact of the extraordinary.

== Death ==
Belloc died 14 November 1947 at the home of her elder daughter, the Countess Iddesleigh (wife of the third Earl) in Eversley Cross, Hampshire, and was interred in France, in La Celle-Saint-Cloud near Versailles, where she had spent her youth.

== Adaptations ==
=== Film ===
- Her most famous novel, The Lodger (1913), based on the Jack the Ripper murders of 1888, has been adapted for the screen several times; the first version was Alfred Hitchcock's silent film The Lodger: A Story of the London Fog (1927). The second was Maurice Elvey's (1932), followed by John Brahm's (1944), Hugo Fregonese's Man in the Attic (1953), and David Ondaatje's (2009).
- Her novel Letty Lynton (1931) was the basis for the 1932 film of the same name starring Joan Crawford.
- Her novel The Story of Ivy (1927) was adapted as Ivy (1947) starring Joan Fontaine.

=== Opera ===
The Lodger is a 1960 opera by Phyllis Tate, based on the 1913 novel,

=== Radio ===
- Hitchcock directed an adaptation of The Lodger for CBS in 1940 which served as the first episode of the radio drama series Suspense.
- A further radio version of The Lodger was produced by the BBC in 2003.
- The Story of Ivy was adapted for a 1945 episode of the CBS radio series Suspense.

== Bibliography ==
=== Non-fiction books ===
- H.R.H. The Prince of Wales: An Account of his Career. New York & London (1898 as Anon, rev. 1901 as His Most Gracious Majesty King Edward VII)
- The Philosophy of the Marquise (1899)
- Bohemia and Bourgeoisia (1900)
- The Life of Queen Alexandra (1901)
- T.R.H. The Prince and Princess of Wales (1902, as Anon.)
- Noted Murder Mysteries (1914, as by 'Philip Curtin': 1916, as by Mrs Belloc Lowndes)
- Told in Gallant Deeds: A Child's History of the War (1914)
- ’’Real Stories of Crime & Mystery’’ (1919, as by 'Philip Curtin')
- I, Too, Have Lived in Arcadia: A Record of Love and Childhood (1941, New York 1942) Autobiography.
- Where Love and Friendship Dwelt (1943) Autobiography.
- The Merry Wives of Westminster (1946) Autobiography.
- A Passing World (1948) Autobiography.

=== Fiction ===
- The Heart of Penelope (1904, New York 1915)
- Barbara Rebell (1905, New York 1907)
- The Pulse of Life: a Story of a Passing World (1907, New York 1909)
- The Uttermost Farthing (1908, New York 1910)
- According to Meredith (1909)
- Studies in Wives (1909: New York, 1910) Short stories
- When No Man Pursueth: An Everyday Story (1910, New York 1911)
- Jane Oglander (1911, New York 1911)
- The Chink in the Armour (1912, New York 1912, London 1935 as The House of Peril). First published as a newspaper serial, The Daily Telegraph & Courier, August 1911
- Mary Pechell (1912, New York 1912)
- The End of Her Honeymoon (New York 1913, London 1914)
- Studies in Love and Terror (1913, New York 1913). Short stories
- The Lodger (1913, New York 1913) made into a film by Alfred Hitchcock with Ivor Novello in 1927.
- Good Old Anna (1915, New York 1916)
- Price of Admiralty (1915)
- The Red Cross Barge (1916, New York 1918)
- Lilla: A Part of Her Life (1916, New York 1917)
- Love and hatred (1917, New York 1917)
- Out of the War (1918, 1934 as The gentleman anonymous)
- The Lonely House (1920, New York 1920) (featuring Hercules Popeau)
- From the Vast Deep (1920, New York 1921 as From out the vasty deep)
- What Timmy Did (1921, New York 1922)
- Why They Married (1922)
- The Philanderer (1923)
- The Terriford Mystery (1924, Garden City NY 1924)
- Some Men and Women (1925, Garden City NY 1928)
- Afterwards (1925)
- Bread of Deceit (1925, Garden City NY 1928 as Afterwards)
- What Really Happened (1926, Garden City NY 1926, London 1932 as a play) made into episode 16 of season 1 of The Alfred Hitchcock Hour in 1963.
- Thou Shalt Not Kill (1927)
- The Story of Ivy (1927, Garden City NY 1928)
- Cressida: no mystery (1928, New York 1930)
- Duchess Laura: certain days of her life (1929, New York 1933 as The duchess Intervenes)
- One of Those Ways (1929) (a Hercules Popeau mystery)
- Love's Revenge (1929)
- The Key: A Love Drama in Three Acts (1930)
- With All John's Love: A Play in Three Acts (1930)
- Letty Lynton (1931, New York 1931) made into a film by MGM with Joan Crawford in 1932.
- Vanderlyn's Adventure (New York 1931, London 1937 as The house by the sea)
- Why Be Lonely? A Comedy in Three Acts", (1931 with F. S. A. Lowndes)
- Jenny Newstead (London 1932, New York 1932). First published as a newspaper serial, Sunday Post, August 1928, as ‘’The Strange Case of Jenny Newstead’’.
- Love is a Flame (1932)
- The Reason Why (1932)
- Dutchess Laura: further days of her life (New York 1933)
- Another Man's Wife (1934, New York 1934)
- The Chianti Flask (New York 1934, London 1935)
- Who Rides on a Tiger (New York 1935, London 1936)
- The Second Key (New York 1936, London 1939 as The injured lover)
- And Call it Accident (New York 1936, London 1939 as And call it an accident)
- The House by the Sea (1937)
- The Marriage Broker (1937, New York 1937 as The fortune of Bridget Malone)
- Motive (1938)
- Empress Eugenie: a three-act play (New York 1938)
- Motive (1938, New York 1938 as Why it happened)
- Reckless Angel (New York 1939)
- Lizzie Borden: A Study in Conjecture (New York: Longmans, Green and Co., 1939, London 1940)
- The Christine Diamond (New York & London 1940)
- Before the Storm (New York 1941)
- What of the Night? (New York 1943)
- The Labours of Hercules (1943)
- She Dwelt with Beauty (published posthumously, 1949)
- The Young Hilaire Belloc (New York 1956)

== See also ==
- George Robert Sims
- Ladies who lunch
- Limit-experience
- Margaret Kennedy
- Violet Hunt
