= Phyllis Tate =

English composer (1911–1987)

- Born: 6 April 1911; Gerrards Cross, Buckinghamshire, UK
- Died: 29 May 1987 (aged 76)
- Education: Royal Academy of Music
- Occupation: Composer
- Spouse: Alan Clifford Frank

Phyllis Tate (6 April 1911 – 29 May 1987) was an English composer known for forming unusual instrumental combinations in her output. She is mainly remembered for her works for solo and chamber ensembles, rather than larger scale forms.

== Biography ==
=== Early life and education ===
Phyllis Margaret Duncan Tate was born at Gerrards Cross in Buckinghamshire, the daughter of an architect, Duncan Tate. She was excluded from primary school by her headmistress at the age of 10 for singing a lewd song her father taught her at the end of the year. According to Tate, her parents believed that the primary role of a woman was to become a mother and raise children, so further education was unnecessary.

Tate's mother possessed some measure of musical skill, and often accompanied her own contralto voice on the piano. Again according to Tate, her mother wished nothing more than that the young Phyllis (or "Phyl" as she was called by her friends) become a "musical genius". To her mother's dismay, Phyllis bought herself a ukulele for ten shillings and taught herself to play. Tate began touring with a musical group she called a "concert party," performing in hospitals, senior care facilities, and at charity events. During this time, she already was writing her own music, consisting of mostly foxtrots and blues songs.

In 1928, Tate was discovered by Harry Farjeon during a concert at the Conservatory of Music in Blackheath. Farjean prompted her to receive formal music training, which she took up at the Royal Academy of Music for the next four years. While at the academy, she studied composition, timpani, and conducting.

Tate married a music editor, Alan Clifford Frank, in 1935. They reportedly initially bonded over a mutual dislike of Ludwig van Beethoven's music. The couple had two children: a son Colin, born in 1940 and a daughter Celia, in 1952. Frank worked for Oxford University Press, the company that began to publish Tate's compositions in 1935.

Although committees were not her forte, Tate was involved in several organizations, usually joining their boards. She participated in the Hampstead Music Club, the Barnet and District Choral Society (she was president and wrote Saint Martha and the Dragon for it), the Performing Rights Society's Member Fund (she was the first woman appointed to be on their management committee), and the Composers’ Guild (where she served on the executive committee).

=== Compositions ===
==== Musical style and philosophy ====
Tate's compositions have been described as "elegant" and "expressive," as well as "clear and accessible". However, she was very self-critical, and destroyed all of her compositions from before the mid-1940s. Tate believed that “music should entertain and give pleasure.” In 1979, she wrote, “I must admit to having a sneaking hope that some of my creations may prove to be better than they appear. One can only surmise and it’s not for the composer to judge. All I can vouch is this: writing music can be hell; torture in the extreme; but there’s one thing worse; and that is not writing it.” After hearing her play at a lunch one day, Dame Ethel Smyth said “At last I have heard a real woman composer!” However, since, at that point, Smyth's hearing was deteriorating, Tate did not put much stock in this.

==== Early works ====
Tate composed a number of pieces including an operetta entitled The Policeman’s Serenade, which she composed while still a student at the Royal Academy. During her school years, she also composed a symphony and several smaller pieces, although none from this era survive.

==== Professional works ====
The first piece she would claim as her own was a concerto for saxophone and strings, written in 1944 and commissioned by the BBC. This is considered to be Tate's first major compositional success. Between then and 1947 Tate composed four pieces: the concerto; a sonata for clarinet and cello (1947); Songs of Sundry Natures (1945); and Nocturne for Four Voices (1945). Tate enjoyed using atypical instrumental combinations. Songs is scored for a baritone accompanied by a flute, clarinet, bassoon, horn and harp. Nocturne is written for four voices with a string quartet, double bass, bass clarinet, and celesta. Following this period of creativity, Tate fell into a five-year slump due to illness.

Although not wishing to write larger instrumental works, Tate's overall artistic output was extraordinary. She experimented in many genres, including orchestral music, chamber music, operas and operettas, sacred music, piano music, and vocal music, which is where she concentrated her efforts. Her most famous pieces, aside from those mentioned above, include:

- Prelude, Interlude, and Postlude (1942) for chamber orchestra.
- The Lady of Shalott (1946), her setting of Tennyson's poem, written for the 10th anniversary of the BBC Third Programme.
- London Fields (1958), a four movement suite for orchestra, commissioned by the BBC.
- The Lodger (1960), an opera based on the tale of Jack the Ripper.
- The What d’ye Call It (1966), an opera based on a farce by John Gay with a libretto by V.C. Clinton-Baddeley.
- A Secular Requiem: The Phoenix and the Turtle (1970) for mixed voices, organ, and orchestra, setting Shakespeare's poem as the text for a funeral.
- All The World’s A Stage (1977) for chorus and orchestra.
- Saint Martha and the Dragon (1978), for narrator, solo soprano, solo tenor, choir, chamber orchestra & tape. A setting of the poem by Charles Causley.

===== The Lodger =====
In 1960, her alma mater, the Royal Academy of Music, mounted the premiere production of The Lodger, which her obituary described as, "a rare example of a successful musical thriller which, like all good thrillers, was grounded upon psychological understanding and an authentic social atmosphere". Lewis Foreman describes the opera as dramatically effective, "with its fog-and-gaslight atmosphere, and a divided set showing two rooms simultaneously. All this is lightened by a series of jolly choruses and the idiosyncratic use of polkas and waltzes. It remains the composer's most considerable operatic achievement."

== Discography ==
- Dreams Melting. James Geer (tenor), Ronald Woodley (piano). SOMM CD 0630 (2021)
- Grimethorpe. Various performers. Chandos B000000A7V (1997).
- In Praise of Women. Anthony Rolfe Johnson, tenor; Graham Johnson, piano. Hyperion B00026W65Y (2004).
- Lee Carrol Levine… Plus!. Roy Christensen, Virginia Christensen, Rebecca Culnan, Lee Carroll Levine, Craig Nies, Christian Teal. Gasparo Records B0001DMUW2 (2004).
- London Landmarks. Royal Ballet Sinfonia. White Line B000067UM9 (2002).
- Saxophone Concerto. On Lost Saxophone Concertos, Olli-Pekka Tuomisalo, Naxos 8.579038 (2018)
- Sonata for Clarinet and Cello. Gervase De Payer and William Pleeth. Argo ZRG 5475 (1966)
- Songs My Father Taught Me. Sir Thomas Allen, baritone; Malcolm Martineau, piano. Hyperion B00005Y0N9 (2002).
- String Quartet in F major. English String Quartet. Tremula Records TREM102-2 (1993).
- Triptych. Clare Howick, Sophia Rahman, Naxos 8.572291 (2010)
