= The Lodger: A Story of the London Fog =

1927 silent film by Alfred Hitchcock

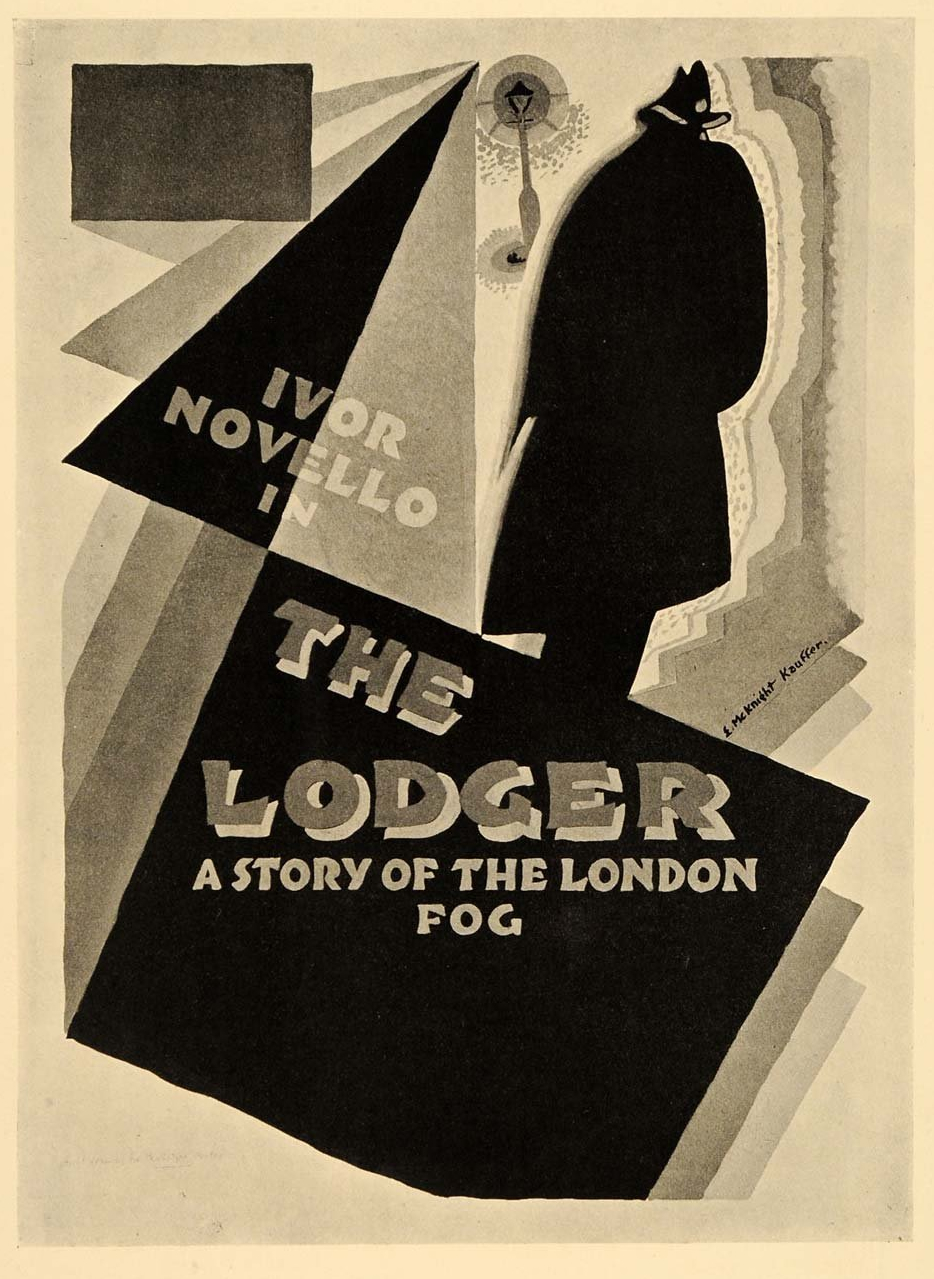
- British theatrical release poster
- Directed by: Alfred Hitchcock
- Screenplay by: Eliot Stannard
- Based on: The Lodger; 1913 novel by Marie Belloc Lowndes
- Produced by: Michael Balcon; Carlyle Blackwell; C. M. Woolf
- Starring: Ivor Novello; Marie Ault; Arthur Chesney; Malcolm Keen; June Tripp
- Cinematography: Gaetano di Ventimiglia
- Edited by: Ivor Montagu
- Production company: Gainsborough Pictures
- Distributed by: Woolf & Freedman Film Service
- Release date: 14 February 1927 (UK)
- Running time: 90 minutes (2012 restoration)
- Country: United Kingdom
- Language: Silent film with English intertitles
- Budget: UK £12,000

The Lodger: A Story of the London Fog (Note: The film was released in the US in June 1928 titled The Case of Jonathan Drew.) is a 1927 British silent thriller film directed by Alfred Hitchcock and starring Marie Ault, Arthur Chesney, June Tripp, Malcolm Keen and Ivor Novello. Hitchcock's third feature film and the earliest to survive intact, it was released on 14 February 1927 in London and on 10 June 1928 in New York City. The film is based on the 1913 novel The Lodger by Marie Belloc Lowndes and the play Who Is He? co-written by Belloc Lowndes. Its plot concerns the hunt for a Jack the Ripper-like serial killer in London.

The film was Hitchcock's first thriller, and established his reputation as a director. Upon its release, the trade journal Bioscope wrote: "It is possible that this film is the finest British production ever made". In a strategy for self-publicity, The Lodger saw him make his first cameo appearance in a film, where he sat in a newsroom. In 2017, the film was included in the BFI's list of 100 essential thrillers.

== Plot ==
The Lodger: A Story of the London Fog (1927)

A young blonde woman screams. She is the seventh victim of a serial killer known as the Avenger, who targets young blonde women on Tuesday evenings.

That night, blonde model Daisy Bunting is at a fashion show when she and the other showgirls hear the news. The blonde girls are horrified, hiding their hair with dark wigs or hats. Daisy returns home to her parents and her policeman sweetheart Joe, who have been reading about the crime in the newspaper.

A handsome but secretive young man bearing a strong resemblance to the description of the murderer arrives at the Bunting house and asks about their room for rent. Mrs. Bunting shows him the room, which is decorated with portraits of beautiful, young, blonde women. He pays her a month's rent in advance. The lodger turns all the portraits around to face the wall and requests that they be removed. Daisy enters to remove the portraits and is attracted to the lodger. The women return downstairs, where they hear the lodger's heavy footsteps as he paces the floor.

The relationship between Daisy and the reclusive lodger gradually becomes serious, making Joe, who is newly assigned to the Avenger case, unhappy. Mrs. Bunting is awoken late at night by the lodger leaving the house. She attempts to search his room, but a small cabinet is locked tight. In the morning, another blonde girl is found dead, just around the corner.

The police observe that the murders are moving towards the Buntings' neighbourhood. The Buntings believe that the lodger is the Avenger, and they try to prevent Daisy spending time with him. The next Tuesday night, Daisy and the lodger sneak away for a late-night assignation. Joe tracks them down and confronts them, and Daisy breaks up with him. Joe begins to piece together the events of the previous weeks and convinces himself that the lodger is indeed the Avenger.

With a warrant and two fellow officers, Joe returns to search the lodger's room. They find a leather bag containing a gun, a map plotting the location of the murders, newspaper clippings about the attacks and a photograph of a beautiful blonde woman, whom Joe recognizes as the Avenger's first victim. The lodger is arrested despite Daisy's protests, but he manages to run off into the night. Daisy finds him handcuffed, coatless and shivering. He explains that the woman in the photograph was his sister, a beautiful debutante murdered by the Avenger at a dance and that he had vowed to his dying mother that he would bring the killer to justice.

Daisy takes the lodger to a pub and gives him brandy to warm him, hiding his handcuffs with a cloak. The suspicious locals pursue them, quickly becoming a mob. The lodger is surrounded and beaten, while Daisy and Joe, who have just heard that the real Avenger has been caught, try in vain to defend him. When all seems lost, a paperboy interrupts with the news that the real Avenger has been arrested. The mob releases the lodger, who falls into Daisy's waiting arms. Some time later, the lodger is shown to have fully recovered from his injuries and he and Daisy are happily living together.

== Cast ==
- Marie Ault as The Landlady (Mrs. Bunting)
- Arthur Chesney as Her Husband (Mr. Bunting)
- June Tripp as Daisy Bunting, a Mannequin
- Malcolm Keen as Joe Chandler
- Ivor Novello as Jonathan Drew (The Lodger)
- Eve Gray as Showgirl Victim (uncredited)
- Alfred Hitchcock as Extra in newspaper office (uncredited)
- Reginald Gardiner as Dancer at Ball (uncredited)
- Alma Reville as Woman Listening to Wireless (uncredited)

Alfred Hitchcock's cameo occurs when he is sitting at a desk in the newsroom with his back to the camera and operating a telephone (4:44 minutes into the film). This is Hitchcock's first recognisable film cameo, and it became a standard practice for the remainder of his films. Hitchcock said that his cameo came about because the actor who was supposed to play the part of the telephone operator failed to appear, so Hitchcock filled in for him. Film scholar William Rothman notes that Hitchcock's cameo from behind is shot in a very similar manner to that of the titular lodger. According to some sources, including the French filmmaker François Truffaut, Hitchcock makes another cameo at the very end of the film in the angry mob, but this has been disputed.

== Hitchcock's common themes ==
The Lodger has many of the themes of Hitchcock's previous and future works. According to Philip French, writing in The Guardian, Hitchcock touches on themes of "the fascination with technique and problem-solving, the obsession with blondes, the fear of authority, the ambivalence towards homosexuality" in The Lodger.

== Pre-production ==
The Lodger is based on a novel of the same name by Marie Belloc Lowndes about the Jack the Ripper murders, as well as the play Who Is He?, a comic stage adaptation of the novel by Horace Annesley Vachell that Hitchcock saw in 1915. News of the film was announced by the British press at the start of 1926 and Ivor Novello was announced as the lead in February. Originally, the film was to end with ambiguity as to the lodger's innocence. However, when Novello was cast, the studio demanded alterations to the script. Hitchcock recalled:

They wouldn't let Novello even be considered as a villain. The publicity angle carried the day, and we had to change the script to show that without a doubt he was innocent.

In recollections such as these, Hitchcock presented himself as having been dissatisfied, but in fact Who is He? has a similarly happy ending.

== Principal photography ==
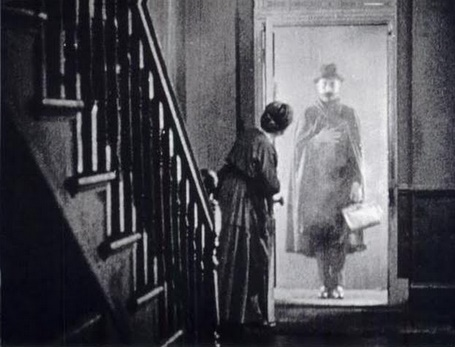
Still from the film

Filming began on 25 February 1926 and principal photography was completed within six weeks. Because Hitchcock practised film methods that mirrored those of German expressionism, scenes would not run for much longer than three minutes each. According to Tripp: "Fresh from Berlin, Hitch was so imbued with the value of unusual camera angles and lighting effects with which to create and sustain dramatic suspense that often a scene which would not run for more than three minutes on the screen would take a morning to shoot."

Tripp had recently undergone an operation at the start of the shoot. She wrote in her autobiography that as a result of Hitchcock making her perform repeated takes of one scene, she felt a "sickening pain somewhere in the region of my appendix scar", and had to return to hospital.

=== Directorial style and cinematography ===
In framing the shots, Hitchcock was influenced by post-war horror, social unrest and the emotional fear of abnormality and madness. The film is silent, but words were not necessary given the visual method of storytelling.

A memorable scene occurs when the Buntings look up at their kitchen ceiling, listening to the lodger pacing above. The ceiling then becomes transparent and the lodger is then seen walking on it (a thick sheet of toughened glass was used). According to the Criterion Collection review by Philip Kemp, this scene was composed of "sixty-five shots in just over six minutes, with no title cards to interrupt. Some disconcerting camera angles, including one straight down the staircase as we see the lodger’s disembodied hand sliding down the banister."

Early in the film, the lodger's room is shown filled with paintings by Edward Burne-Jones of nude blonde women who resemble the Avenger's victims, but among them is a painting of Saint George freeing a woman from being sacrificed; this may be Hitchcock's use of foreshadowing to suggest that the lodger is not the killer.

== Post-production ==
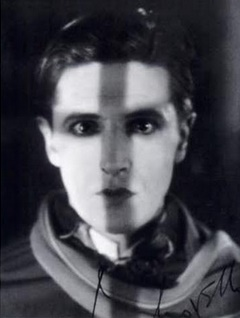
Publicity still of Ivor Novello

Upon viewing Hitchcock's finished film, producer Michael Balcon was reportedly furious and nearly shelved it. After considerable argument, a compromise was reached and film critic Ivor Montagu was hired to salvage the film. Hitchcock was initially resentful of the intrusion, but Montagu recognised the director's technical skill and artistry and made only minor suggestions, mostly concerning the title cards and the reshooting of a few minor scenes.

Hitchcock scholar Donald Spoto, who had not viewed the director's earlier two films, described The Lodger as "the first time Hitchcock has revealed his psychological attraction to the association between sex and murder, between ecstasy and death." Spoto also stated: "Montagu's claim that Hitchcock's edit contained up to 500 intertitles seems likely an exaggeration, but he worked with the director during the summer months to tighten up the film. One of the other improvements was to hire American poster artist Edward McKnight Kauffer to design the animated triangular title cards."

A successful trade screening of the reedited film overcame Woolf's prior objections and its theatrical success allowed for the British release of Hitchcock's prior film, The Mountain Eagle.

== Significance and legacy ==
Upon release, the film was a critical and commercial success. In a review of the film in the British trade journal Bioscope, it was called "the finest British production ever made". On review aggregator Rotten Tomatoes, the film holds an approval rating of 96% based on 25 reviews, with an average rating of 7.70/10.

The Lodger continued themes that would run through much of Hitchcock's later work, such as that of an innocent man on the run. Hitchcock had reportedly studied contemporary films by Murnau and Lang, whose influence may be seen in the ominous camera angles and claustrophobic lighting. While Hitchcock had made two films, in later years the director would refer to The Lodger as the first true "Hitchcock film." Beginning with The Lodger, Hitchcock helped shape the modern thriller genre in film.

After arriving in the United States in 1940, Hitchcock was involved with a radio adaptation of the film with Herbert Marshall, Edmund Gwenn and Lurene Tuttle. In its review of the adaptation, Variety wrote: "Hitchcock is a director with an exceptionally acute ear. He achieves his results by a Ravel-like rhythmic pummelling of the nervous system. Music, sound effects, the various equivalents of squeaking shoes, deep breathing, disembodied voices are mingled in the telling of the tale with a mounting accumulation of small descriptive touches that pyramid the tension." The adaptation preserves the original novel's ending rather than that of the film and does not resolve the question of the lodger's identity as the killer.

In early 1942, the Los Angeles Times reported that Hitchcock was considering a colour remake of The Lodger following the completion of Saboteur (1942), but he was unable to obtain the film rights.

In 2014, the Dallas Chamber Symphony commissioned an original film score for The Lodger from composer Douglas Pipes. The score premiered at a concert screening of the film on 8 October 2014 at Moody Performance Hall with Richard McKay conducting.

The Lodger has been considered by some film critics to be Hitchcock's greatest silent film.

== Preservation status and home media ==
In commemoration of the 100th anniversary of Hitchcock's birth, an orchestral soundtrack was composed by Ashley Irwin. The recording with the Deutsches Filmorchester Babelsberg was broadcast over the ARTE TV network in Europe on 13 August 1999. Its first live performance occurred on 29 September 2000 in the Nikolaisaal in Potsdam by the Deutsches Filmorchester Babelsberg under the direction of Scott Lawton. Following several restorations, a new tinted digital restoration of The Lodger was completed in 2012 as part of the BFI's £2 million "Save the Hitchcock 9" project to restore Hitchcock's surviving silent films. Restored releases have appeared on DVD, Blu-ray and Video on demand services worldwide from Network Distributing in the UK, MGM and Criterion in the U.S. and others. In 2022, The Lodger entered the public domain in the United States.
