= The Man Who Could Cheat Death =

1959 British film by Terence Fisher

- Theatrical release poster
- Directed by: Terence Fisher
- Screenplay by: Jimmy Sangster
- Based on: The Man in Half Moon Street by Barré Lyndon
- Produced by: Michael Carreras
- Starring: Anton Diffring; Hazel Court; Christopher Lee; Arnold Marlé; Delphi Lawrence; Francis de Wolff
- Cinematography: Jack Asher
- Edited by: John Dunsford
- Music by: Richard Bennett
- Production company: Hammer Film Productions
- Distributed by: Paramount Pictures
- Release dates: June 1959 (U.S.); 30 November 1959 (UK)
- Running time: 83 minutes
- Country: United Kingdom
- Language: English
- Budget: £84,000

The Man Who Could Cheat Death is a 1959 British horror film, directed by Terence Fisher and starring Anton Diffring, Hazel Court, and Christopher Lee. Jimmy Sangster adapted the screenplay from the play The Man in Half Moon Street by Barré Lyndon, which had been previously filmed in 1945. The Man Who Could Cheat Death was produced by Michael Carreras and Anthony Nelson Keys for Hammer Film Productions.

== Plot ==
In Paris, France in 1890, Dr. Georges Bonnet, a doctor and hobbyist sculptor, abruptly ends the fashionable party he is hosting. Georges harbours a secret; though he appears to be in his mid-30s, he is actually 104 years old, and has kept his youth and vitality through parathyroid gland transplants every 10 years. Professor Ludwig Weiss of Vienna, co-discoverer of this anti-ageing process, is three weeks late in arriving at Georges's home to perform the latest transplant. As a result, Georges must drink a steaming green elixir every six hours to stay young, though the elixir only buys him four weeks without the transplant. When Georges's latest model, Margo Philippe, comes across Georges drinking the fluid, he strikes her down. When the 89-year-old Ludwig finally arrives, he reveals he will be unable to operate on Georges because a stroke has incapacitated his right hand. Ludwig instructs Georges to find another surgeon.

Surété Inspector LeGris begins to investigate Margo's disappearance and arrives at a dinner party hosted by Georges for Janine Du Bois, a former lover, and Dr. Pierre Gerrard. Georges denies knowing Margo's whereabouts and, when LeGris asks to see the bust of Margo, tells him that he accidentally destroyed it that morning. LeGris leaves and Georges admits to his startled guests that he lied, as the police would probably damage the bust if he turned it over to them. Secretly, Ludwig convinces Pierre to perform the transplant surgery, claiming that Georges is deathly ill and in urgent need of treatment.

After Janine and Pierre have left, Ludwig tells Georges that Pierre will operate. However, Ludwig has grown suspicious of Georges and says it is strange that this is the third of George's models who has gone missing around the time of his transplants. Ludwig discovers that the newest parathyroid gland is from a living person, instead of being "revitalized" from a corpse. When Ludwig confronts Georges that his actions are unjustified, George retorts that he revitalized four glands from corpses but they all died because Ludwig was late, adding to Georges's hatred of being alone in this world. Ludwig destroys the elixir to prevent Georges from continuing; Georges strangles Ludwig to death.

Pierre arrives the following morning to perform the operation, but Georges tells him that Ludwig was unexpectedly called back to Vienna. Pierre refuses to carry on and suggests that Georges find another surgeon. Georges visits other surgeons in Paris to no avail. Meanwhile, LeGris tells Pierre of the disappearances of three young women at 10 year intervals - in London, San Francisco and Bern, Switzerland - and that each modeled for a sculptor that doubled as a doctor and also disappeared at the same time as the models. With Margo also missing, LeGris believes Georges is responsible for all the disappearances, but Pierre doubts him, since that would place the suspect in his 60s.

Georges takes Janine to a storeroom which holds his sculptures and proudly shows her the first figurine he made as a boy at the age of 12. The figurine is dated 1798. Janine laughingly says the date must be incorrect because if it weren't, Georges would be 104. Georges abruptly leaves, locking Janine in the storeroom. He then goes to Pierre and tells him that he and Ludwig discovered the secret of "perpetual life" decades earlier, but he cannot reveal the secret to the world because if everyone could live forever, paradoxically, everyone would eventually die without a fresh supply of new parathyroid glands. Pierre, again, refuses to perform the transplant but relents when Georges threatens Janine's life. Janine finds a mentally insane Margo imprisoned in the storeroom.

That night, Pierre fakes the operation by making the incision at Georges's waist but not transplanting the gland. Georges rushes to the storeroom as Pierre and LeGris follow. Georges tells Janine that the same operation will allow her to live forever, always young and beautiful and in love alongside him. She refuses. Suddenly, Georges begins ageing rapidly and realizes that Pierre did not perform the operation. As he exclaims he's dying, Margo throws an oil lamp on him, setting the storeroom ablaze. Pierre and LeGris rescue Janine as Georges and Margo die in the consuming flames.

== Cast ==
Credited:

- Anton Diffring as Dr Georges Bonnet
- Hazel Court as Janine Dubois
- Christopher Lee as Dr Pierre Gerrard
- Arnold Marlé as Professor Ludwig Weiss
- Delphi Lawrence as Margo Phillipe
- Francis de Wolff as Inspector LeGris

Uncredited:

- Ronald Adam as fastidious doctor
- Marie Burke as woman at private view
- John Harrison as servant
- Ian Hewitson as Roger
- Gerda Larsen as street girl
- Charles Lloyd-Pack as man at private view
- Frederick Rawlings as footman
- Denis Shaw as tavern customer
- Barry Shawzin as unhygienic doctor
- Middleton Woods as elderly victim

== Production ==
The lead role of Bonnet was originally offered to Peter Cushing, who turned it down six days before shooting started. Cushing's reason was that he was completely exhausted 'following the shooting of The Hound of the Baskervilles (1959), which had just wrapped up'. The loss of Cushing caused Hammer to threaten legal action against him. However, Cushing had not signed a final contract with Hammer, and nothing could be done, although an angry Paramount, which was partly financing and distributing the film, 'relegated to picture to the lower half of double bills in the States'. The lead went to Diffring, who had played it 18 months earlier in the British ABC-TV adaptation of The Man in Half Moon Street, an episode of the programme Hour of Mystery. ABC was part of the ITV commercial consortium and broadcast primarily in the Midlands and North of England.

Filming of The Man Who Could Cheat Death took place between 17 November and 30 December 1958 at Bray Studios. Its working title was The Man in the Rue Noire.

The European release of the film featured a scene in which Court appeared topless. She was paid 'an extra £2000' for the scene, in which she is posing for a sculpture made by Diffring's character. The stone bust of Janine that is shown repeatedly in the film is in fact 'a plaster cast made from Court's torso'. The scene does not appear in the UK or US prints and the footage was considered lost until 2025, when home video company Vinegar Syndrome announced the release of a Blu-Ray with the footage intact. This release also restores the original, more violent ending, which was cut by the BBFC in order to obtain an X certificate.

A scene in which Michael Ripper portrayed a morgue attendant was cut from the film's release print.

== Distribution ==
The Man Who Could Cheat Death was distributed in the UK and the US by Paramount. The film was first screened at the London Trade Show on 5 June 1959. It went into general release in the UK on 30 November 1959 as the first film on a double bill with The Evil That is Eve (1957). However, the movie was in general release earlier in the US, where it opened on 19 August 1959.

The film was still being shown in US movie theatres into the 1960s. For example, it was the second film in a triple feature - between The Black Orchid (1958) and Maracaibo (1959) - at the Mt Lebanon Drive-In in Lebanon PA on 19 July 1963. Two years later, the movie continued to be at the bottom of a double bill. On 7 May 1965, it ran as the second film to Dr. Terror's House of Horrors (1965) at three theatres in San Francisco - the New Mission Theatre, the El Rancho Drive-In and the Esquire Theatre - as well as at theatres in the surrounding East Bay communities of Oakland, Fremont, Hayward and San Leandro.

For home viewing in the UK, the video was given a 12 certificate by the BBFC on 28 August 2015 for 'limited' but 'moderate injury detail', which includes scarred faces, rapid ageing, strangulation and death by fire. The first US release of a video of the film was on 21 October 2008.

== Reception ==
The Hammer Story: The Authorised History of Hammer Films calls the film an "odd mish-mash of mad scientist sci-fi flick and gothic flannel" that "suffers from an excess of dialogue and a lack of action."

This assessment was reflected in contemporary reviews. Film scholar Chris Fellner quotes several: the 20 June 1959 issue of Harrison's Reports says that the movie's 'chief drawback' is 'that it is given more to talk than to movement'; Variety's issue of 24 June 1959 calls it 'well acted and intelligently conceived. But invention and embellishment in this field appear to have been exhausted', and the Motion Picture Exhibitor issue of 1 July 1959 describes The Man Who Could Cheat Death as suffering from 'relying mainly on talk'.

Motion Picture Daily thought it was "a surprisingly effective, even literate treatment of the oft-used premise" and closed with, "One final word of praise for Hammer: (the picture) reflects top production values and acting is far from slipshod. The Technicolor print is something to behold." At the time of its release, reviewers consistently noted the effect of Technicolor and high production values.

Film scholar Phil Hardy writes that visually the film 'looks like one of Hammer's more lavish productions', although it is a 'minor item' in Fisher's work. He describes the movie as having a 'perfunctory script', which makes it a 'rather awkward variation on the Dorian Gray motif'.

In the 'Hazel Court' chapter of Scream Queens: Heroines of the Horrors, author Calvin Thomas Beck praises the performances of the three main actors. He writes that Diffring shows 'unique and excellent villainy' and is a 'magnificent heavy who has been shamefully neglected by filmmakers'. Court, he writes, is a 'fine, striking actress at all times'. He calls The Man Who Could Cheat Death one of her 'finest British thrillers'. Beck also notes that Christopher Lee 'unexpectedly reversed his monster-villain image' in the film.

== Novelisation ==
The screenplay of The Man Who Could Cheat Death was rewritten as an inexpensive paperback novel in 1959. It was published in the US by Avon Books and sold for 35¢, with the authors named as 'Barre' Lyndon and Jimmy Sangster. In the UK, where the book sold for 2/6, Ace Books listed the author as John Sansom, the pen name of Sangster.
