= The Drums of Asia =

1921 film

- Directed by: Uwe Jens Krafft
- Written by: Richard Arnold Bermann (novel); Karl Figdor
- Starring: Rudolf Lettinger; Käthe Haack; Arnold Marlé
- Cinematography: Franz Planer; Otto Kanturek
- Production company: Münchner Lichtspielkunst
- Distributed by: Bavaria Film
- Release date: 25 January 1921
- Country: Germany
- Languages: Silent; German intertitles

The Drums of Asia (German: Die Trommeln Asiens) is a 1921 German silent film directed by Uwe Jens Krafft and starring Rudolf Lettinger, Käthe Haack and Arnold Marlé.

It was shot at the Emelka Studios in Munich. The film's sets were designed by the art director Willy Reiber.

== Cast ==
- Rudolf Lettinger as van Daalen
- Käthe Haack
- Arnold Marlé
- Hans Carl Mueller as Pastor Zurbinden
- Olga Biedermann
- Mary Thomas
- Heinrich Schroth as Hopkins
- Vladimir Agayev
- Erner Huebsch

== Bibliography ==
- Bock, Hans-Michael & Bergfelder, Tim. The Concise CineGraph. Encyclopedia of German Cinema. Berghahn Books, 2009.
- Kristin Thompson. Herr Lubitsch Goes to Hollywood: German and American Film After World War I. Amsterdam University Press, 2005.
