= Das Buch Esther =

German Silent Historical Film

- Directed by: Uwe Jens Krafft; Ernst Reicher
- Written by: Uwe Jens Krafft; Ernst Reicher
- Release date: 1919
- Country: Germany
- Language: Silent

Das Buch Esther (English: The Book of Esther) is a German silent historical film from 1919, set in the time of biblical antiquity. The direction and script are by Uwe Jens Krafft and Ernst Reicher. Reicher and Stella Harf, who played the main roles, were married at the time.

== Plot ==
At a royal court during the Old Testament period, King Ahasuerus rules over the country. His queen, Vasthi, and the field captain Haman, plot against the Jews of their country. Both want to persuade the king to order that all Jews in the land worship the king's god, while Haman plans to proclaim himself king. The Jews decide to procure a young virgin for the king in order to ingratiate themselves with the monarch. The beautiful Esther is chosen to become the king's new favorite, and Mordecai retains control over his ward as guardian. They hope that Esther can influence the king to save the Jews in the land. When it is time to introduce all the young girls to the king, Vasthi tries to prevent Esther from being noticed by her husband because of her beauty. But the king notices her and allows himself to be seduced by her. He casts out Vasthi, chooses Esther as the new queen and gives a magnificent banquet in her honor. Haman and Vasthi now feel left out. They plan to murder the king while he sleeps. Vasthi organizes a banquet in the king's honor and invites Haman as well as the king. But the king learns of the plot and Haman and Vasthi are killed. A proclamation is issued freeing Jews from their persecution.

== Main cast ==
- Ernst Reicher, as King Ahasuerus
- Stella Harf, as Queen Esther
- Käthe Wittenberg, as former Queen Vasthi
- Michael Bohnen, as Field Captain Haman
- Rudolf Lettinger, as Mordecai, the chairman of Yehudim
