= The Ocarina =

- Directed by: Uwe Jens Krafft
- Written by: Bobby E. Lüthge; Karin Michaëlis (novel)
- Produced by: Isidor Fett; Karl Wiesel
- Starring: Conrad Veidt; Charlotte Böcklin; Rudolf Lettinger
- Cinematography: Max Lutze
- Production companies: Bayerische Filmgesellschaft Fett & Wiesel
- Release date: 8 August 1919
- Running time: 82 minutes
- Country: Germany
- Languages: Silent; German intertitles

The Ocarina (German: Die Okarina) is a 1919 German silent drama film directed by Uwe Jens Krafft and starring Conrad Veidt, Charlotte Böcklin and Rudolf Lettinger.

== Cast ==
- Charlotte Böcklin
- Rudolf Lettinger
- Conrad Veidt as Jaap

== Bibliography ==
- John T. Soister. Conrad Veidt on Screen: A Comprehensive Illustrated Filmography. McFarland, 2002.
