= The Amazing Dr. Clitterhouse (play) =

1936 play

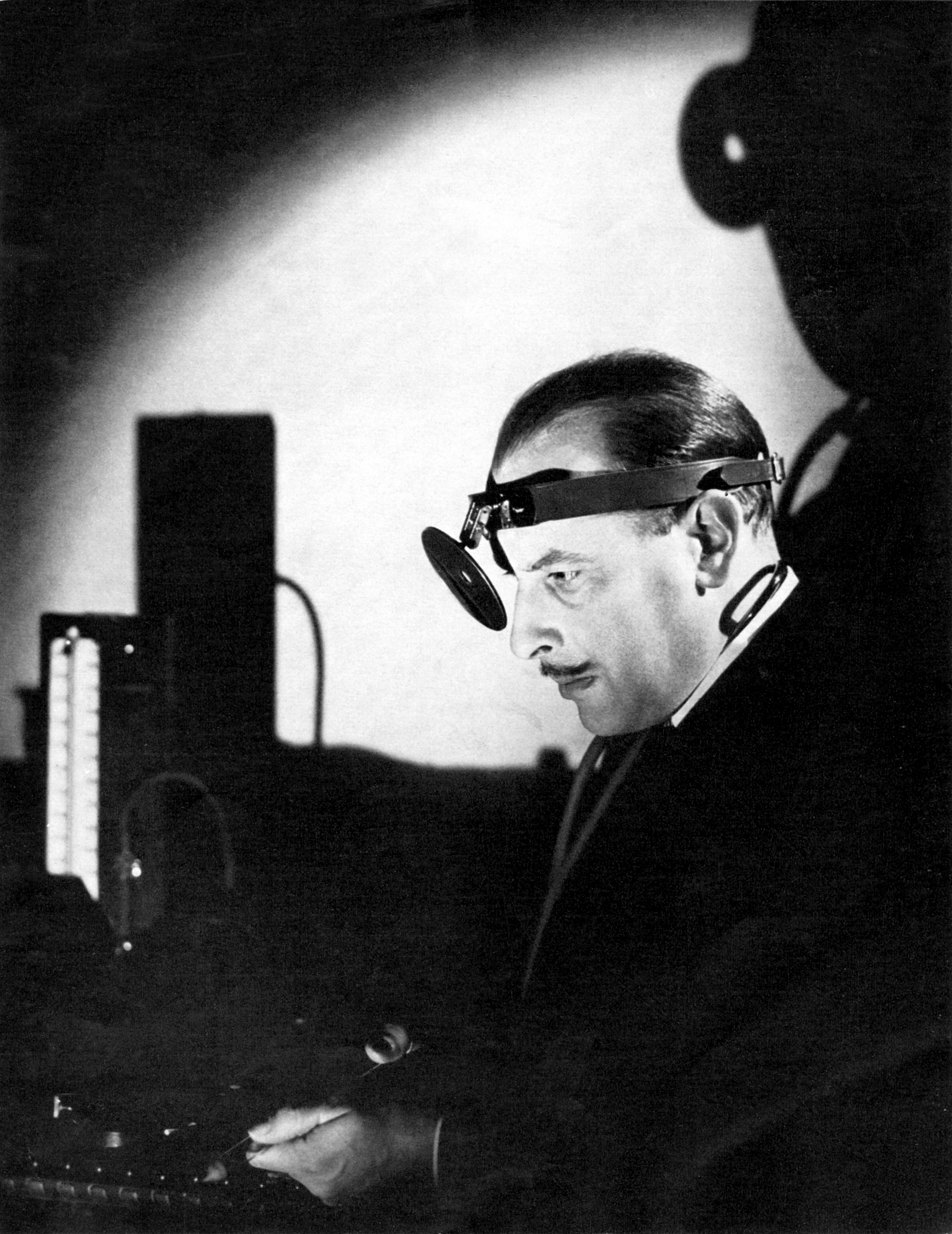
- Cedric Hardwicke playing the title role on Broadway
- Original language: English
- Written by: Barré Lyndon
- Genre: Thriller

Premiere
- Date: 6 August 1936
- Place: Haymarket Theatre, London

The Amazing Dr. Clitterhouse is a 1936 thriller play by the British writer Barré Lyndon. The lead character's name is a play on the term for the female sexual organ the clitoris - a name characterised by the "yearning, untrammelled nature" of Clitterhouse himself; an extremely daring pun for 1936, yet seemingly anticipated by Lyndon to escape the notice of the contemporary censor. Lyndon wrote, "My view was that he was no more likely to locate the pun in my title as to locate the source of it on his beloved bedfellow". Dr. Drew Casper and Richard Jewell's audio commentary for the film version never mentions the ribald pun but instead states that Lyndon wasn't able to find the name in a London phone book. There is a Clitterhouse Road and Clitterhouse Playing Fields in the London Borough of Barnet, but they may not predate the play. Dr. Clitterhouse is sometimes addressed as "Clit" by his friend, Inspector Charles. The full name is always clearly enunciated in the film version.

The play premiered at the Haymarket Theatre in London's West End, produced by Claud Gurney, and ran for 491 performances. The original cast included Ralph Richardson. In 1937 it transferred to Broadway with Cedric Hardwicke in the leading role.

== Characters ==
(in order of their appearance)

Nurse Ann ... Joan Marion
Dr. Clitterhouse ... Ralph Richardson
Detective-Inspector Charles (of Scotland Yard) ... Eric Stanley
Benny Kellerman ... Charles Mortimer
"Pal" Green ... Charles Farrell
Daisy (a friend of Kellerman) ... Meriel Forbes
Sergeant Augustus Bates ... Vincent Holman
A Constable ... Ralph Michael
Bob "Oakie" Oakes... S. Victor Stanley
"Tug" Wilson ... Norman Pierce
"Badger" Lee (an ex-convict) ... Hugh E. Wright
Sir William Grant, K.C. ... Frederick Worlock

Mentioned characters:

Mrs. Sunning
Her little boy, a patient of Dr. Clitterhouse
Councillor Anderson, a burglary victim
Lady Challing, a burglary victim
Sir James Hillary
Harry Lauder

== Synopsis ==
Act I, Scene 1

Nurse Ann is in love with Dr. Clitterhouse. She has been waiting for him to return to the office at one in the morning. When he arrives he immediately wants to check his blood pressure and other vitals. She discovers some white paint on his coat. She gets a bottle of ether from his bag and discovers that he has stolen jewels from Cranston Lodge in his bag, which she promises to keep a professional secret even though she doesn't like it. Detective-Inspector Charles sees the lights on and drops in for a visit, being friends with Dr. Clitterhouse. Lady Challing, one of the previous burglary victims, has involved Scotland Yard based on the value of the stolen jewels as 2,000 pounds, and because each crime was committed four days apart, the Yard expects the next one to follow quickly. Over coffee, Charles and Clitterhouse, who know each other affectionately as Charley and Clit, discuss the burglar's methods in the Challing burglary, which Charles dismisses as the work of a rank amateur, identifying the use of the gardener's ladder, a table-knife, and a tyre-lever. As casual conversation, Clitterhouse asks Charles how one gets rid of his "swag," and Charles tells him about fences, saying that there wouldn't be any crime without them. He tells him that fences aren't very smart except for one named Benny Kellerman, who has a club of Theobald's Road. Charley is soon called at Clitterhouse's by the constable in the police box to let him know that Cranston Lodge, the home of Councillor Anderson, has been burgled and leaves to investigate. After Charles leaves, Clitterhouse explains to Ann that criminals need to be caught much earlier through investigations of their medical state and has begun studying crime by committing crimes himself in order to experiment on himself in order to learn the pathology of crime. Ann reiterates her promise to keep what he us doing confidential and promises to unload the loot at Benny Kellerman's in the morning.

== Film adaptation ==
The screen rights to the play were initially acquired by producer Carl Laemmle, Jr. for $55,000, who intended to make the film with MGM, but who then sold the rights to Warner Bros. who adapted it into a film version of the same title directed by Anatole Litvak and starring Edward G. Robinson, Claire Trevor and Humphrey Bogart. It shifted the location of the action from London to New York. There are numerous other changes, the most drastic of which is Ben Kellerman's gender redone as Jo Keller, which was a common occurrence in films of the period that Vincent Sherman called "the switch" or "the switcheroo."

== Bibliography ==
- Kabatchnik, Amnon. Blood on the Stage, 1925-1950: Milestone Plays of Crime, Mystery, and Detection : an Annotated Repertoire. Scarecrow Press, 2010.
- Lyndon, Barré. The Amazing Dr. Clitterhouse: A Play in Three Acts. London: Samuel French Limited, 1938.
- Wearing, J.P. The London Stage 1930-1939: A Calendar of Productions, Performers, and Personnel. Rowman & Littlefield, 2014.
