= Night of the Burglar =

1921 film

- Directed by: Uwe Jens Krafft
- Written by: Ernst B. Fey; Eugen Hollstein
- Starring: Paul Richter; Aud Egede-Nissen; Rudolf Lettinger
- Cinematography: Franz Planer; Gustav Weiß
- Production company: Münchner Lichtspielkunst
- Distributed by: Bavaria Film
- Release date: 23 September 1921
- Country: Germany
- Languages: Silent; German intertitles

Night of the Burglar (German: Die Nacht der Einbrecher) is a 1921 German silent drama film directed by Uwe Jens Krafft and starring Paul Richter, Aud Egede-Nissen, and Rudolf Lettinger.

It was shot at the Emelka Studios in Munich.

== Cast ==
- Paul Richter as Dag Williams, ein Mann mit unbestimmtem Beruf
- Aud Egede-Nissen as Ellen Troace, Inhaberin der Tresor-Comp
- Rudolf Lettinger as Green, ihr Direktor
- Ferdinand Martini as Jack, ein großes Talent
- Otto Kronburger as Basil Hunter, Inhaber der Safe-Comp.
- Arnold Marlé as Dodiley, erster Direktor der American-Bank
- Carl Sick as Robertson, sein Prokurist

== Bibliography ==
- Bock, Hans-Michael; Bergfelder, Tim, eds. (2009). The Concise Cinegraph: Encyclopaedia of German Cinema. New York: Berghahn Books. ISBN 978-1-57181-655-9.
