= His Best Friend =

His Best Friend may refer to:

- His Best Friend (1918 film), a German silent film directed by Uwe Jens Krafft
- His Best Friend (1929 film), a German silent film directed by Harry Piel
- His Best Friend (1937 film), a German film remake, also directed by Piel
- His Best Friend (1962 film), a West German film directed by Luis Trenker
