= The Tiger of Circus Farini =

1923 film

- Directed by: Uwe Jens Krafft
- Written by: Uwe Jens Krafft; Bobby E. Lüthge; Paul Rosenhayn
- Produced by: Jakob Karol
- Starring: Helena Makowska; Arnold Korff; Elsie Fuller
- Cinematography: Akos Farkas; Karl Freund; Max Grix; Ludwig Lippert
- Production company: Jakob Karol Film
- Distributed by: UFA
- Release date: August 1923
- Country: Germany
- Languages: Silent; German intertitles

The Tiger of Circus Farini (German: Der Tiger des Zirkus Farini) is a 1923 German silent film directed by Uwe Jens Krafft and starring Helena Makowska, Arnold Korff and Elsie Fuller.

The film's art direction was by Fritz Kraenke.

== Cast ==
- Helena Makowska
- Arnold Korff
- Elsie Fuller
- Rudolf Lettinger
- Albert Patry
- Ferry Sikla
- Luigi Serventi
- Hermann Picha
- Karl Falkenberg
- Aruth Wartan
- Leonhard Haskel
- Wilhelm Diegelmann
- Hans Albers
- Frida Richard
- Margarete Kupfer
- Siegfried Berisch
