= Barré Lyndon =

British playwright and screenwriter (1896–1972)

Alfred Edgar Frederick Higgs (12 August 1896 – 23 October 1972), who wrote under the name Barré Lyndon, was a British playwright and screenwriter.

Born in London, Lyndon may be best remembered for his stage play The Man in Half Moon Street, which opened at London's New Theatre on 22 March 1939 and ran for 172 performances, starring Leslie Banks, Malcolm Keen and Ann Todd, as well as for three screenplays from the 1940s: The Lodger (1944), Hangover Square (1945) and The Man in Half Moon Street (1945). The last was remade by Hammer Film Productions in 1959 as The Man Who Could Cheat Death.

Lyndon began his writing career as a journalist, particularly about motor-racing, and short-story writer before becoming a playwright. His first play, The Amazing Dr. Clitterhouse, was made into an Edward G. Robinson film in 1939. After that success, Lyndon moved to Los Angeles, California, in 1941, to concentrate on writing for films full-time. He was naturalised as a United States citizen in the United States District Court in Los Angeles as Alfred Edgar Barre Lyndon in 1952.

He had two sons, Roger Alvin Edgar (b. England, 1924) and Barry Davis Edgar (b. England, 1929).

== Partial filmography ==
- The Amazing Dr. Clitterhouse, directed by Anatole Litvak (1938, based on the play The Amazing Dr. Clitterhouse)
- They Came by Night, directed by Harry Lachman (UK, 1940, based on the play They Came by Night)
- The Man in Half Moon Street, directed by Ralph Murphy (1945, based on the play The Man in Half Moon Street)
- The Man Who Could Cheat Death, directed by Terence Fisher (UK, 1959, based on the play The Man in Half Moon Street)

=== Screenwriter ===
- Sundown, directed by Henry Hathaway (1941)
- The Lodger, directed by John Brahm (1944, based on the novel The Lodger by Marie Belloc Lowndes)
- Hangover Square, directed by John Brahm (1945, based on the novel Hangover Square by Patrick Hamilton)
- The House on 92nd Street, directed by Henry Hathaway (1945)
- Night Has a Thousand Eyes, directed by John Farrow (1948, based on the novel Night Has a Thousand Eyes by Cornell Woolrich)
- To Please a Lady, directed by Clarence Brown (1950)
- The Greatest Show on Earth, directed by Cecil B. DeMille (1952)
- The War of the Worlds, directed by Byron Haskin (1953, based on the novel The War of the Worlds by H. G. Wells)
- Man in the Attic, directed by Hugo Fregonese (1953, based on the novel The Lodger by Marie Belloc Lowndes)
- Sign of the Pagan, directed by Douglas Sirk (1954)
- Omar Khayyam, directed by William Dieterle (1957)
- The Little Shepherd of Kingdom Come, directed by Andrew V. McLaglen (1961, based on the novel The Little Shepherd of Kingdom Come by John Fox Jr.)
- Dark Intruder, directed by Harvey Hart (1965)

== Partial bibliography ==
- Alfred Edgar (1927). Knights of the Wheel. London: Harrap
- Alfred Edgar (1929). The Abbeygate Cricket Cup. London: Frederick_Warne_%26_Co.
- Alfred Edgar (1930). The Nine O'Clock Mail. London: Frederick_Warne_%26_Co.
- Alfred Edgar (1931). The Schoolboy Airmen. London: Frederick_Warne_%26_Co.
- Barré Lyndon (1932). The Luck of the Game Again. UK: The MG Car Company
- — (1933). Combat: A Motor Racing History. London: Heinemann
- — (1934). Circuit Dust. London: John Miles
- — (1935). Grand Prix. London: John Miles
- G.E.T. Eyston; Barré Lyndon (1935). Motor Racing and Record Breaking. London: Batsford
