= Drew Casper =

American film scholar

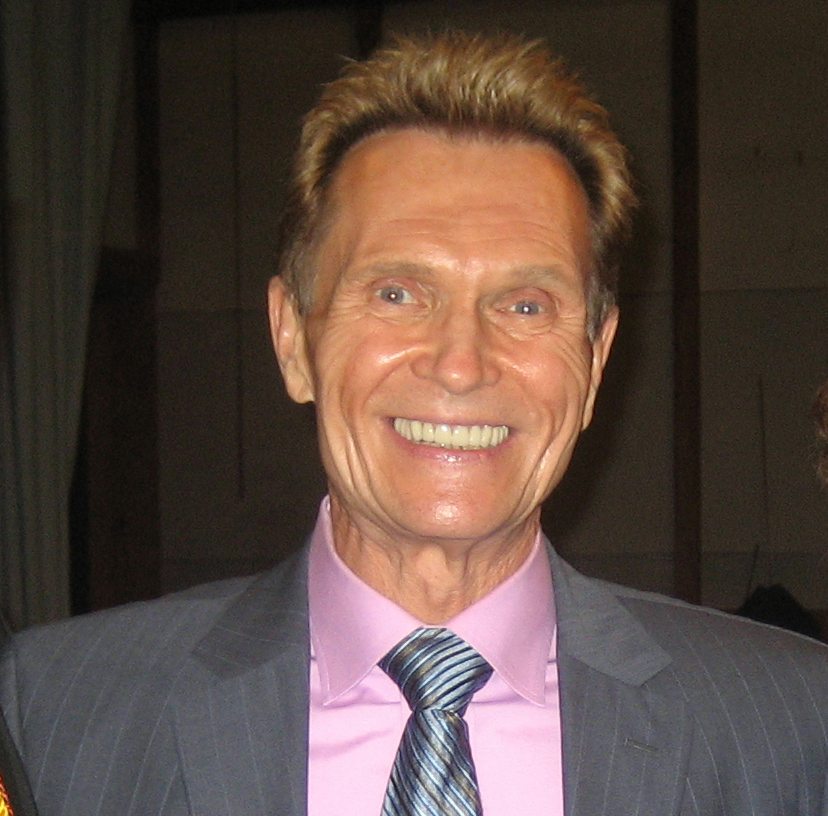
Drew Casper

Joseph Andrew "Drew" Casper is a former professor who worked at the School of Cinematic Arts as part of the University of Southern California from 1971 until his retirement in 2019. His area of research while both a student and later as a professor was American film from World War II to the present. While a Ph.D. student at USC, Dr. Casper's mentor, Irwin Blacker, died suddenly and the Cinema department offered Dr. Casper a position. Casper rose to become the third-highest-paid person at USC. In the fall of 1997, the estate of Alfred Hitchcock and USC made Dr. Casper the first Alma and Alfred Hitchcock Professor for the Study of American Film. He retired from his role at USC in December 2019 after 47 years.

== Bibliography ==
- Vincente Minnelli and the Film Musical (1977) as Joseph Andrew Casper
- Stanley Donen (1983) as Joseph Andrew Casper
- Introduction to Film: Reader (2004)
- Postwar Hollywood: 1946–1962 (2007)
- Hollywood Cinema 1963–1976 (2011)

== Audio commentaries ==
In the early 2000s, Caspar provided home video commentaries for various films from the 1940s-60s.

- Act of Violence
- Advise and Consent
- The Amazing Dr. Clitterhouse, with film historian Richard B. Jewell
- The Asphalt Jungle, with actor James Whitmore
- Cabin in the Sky, with Evangela Anderson and Eva Anderson (wife and daughter of actor Eddie "Rochester" Anderson), dancer Fayard Nicholas, and black cultural scholar Todd Boyd, plus interview excerpts of actress Lena Horne
- The Dolly Sisters
- The Gang's All Here
- The Hustler
- Lady Killer
- Lifeboat
- Lust for Life
- My Blue Heaven
- Notorious
- Possessed
- The Prodigal
- This Is the Army, with actress Joan Leslie
- To Catch a Thief
- 12 Angry Men
- White Heat
- The Young Philadelphians, with director Vincent Sherman
