= Arnold Marlé =

German actor (1887–1970)

- in The Man Who Could Cheat Death (1959)
- Born: 15 September 1887; Berlin, German Empire
- Died: 21 February 1970 (aged 82); London, England
- Occupations: Actor and stage director
- Spouse: Lily Freud

Arnold Marlé (15 September 1887 – 21 February 1970) was a German actor who appeared largely in British films and television programmes.

== Stage work ==
His theatre work included appearances on the London stage, and a year-and-a-half-long run on Broadway in Paddy Chayefsky's The Tenth Man from 1959 to 1961.

== Family ==
In 1917 Marlé married actress Lily Freud, daughter of Sigmund Freud's sister Maria "Mitzi" Moritz-Freud and her husband (and cousin), Moritz Freud. They adopted Angela Seidmann-Freud when her mother, Tom Seidmann-Freud died in 1930.

== Partial filmography ==
- Das Fräulein von Scuderi (1919) — René Cardillac, Goldschmied
- George Bully (1920)
- The Drums of Asia (1921)
- Night of the Burglar (1921)
- The Shadow of Gaby Leed (1921)
- Maciste and the Javanese (1922)
- The Malay Junk (1924)
- Dood Water (1934) — Dirk Brak
- One of Our Aircraft Is Missing (1942) — Pieter Sluys
- Thunder Rock (1942) — President of the Medical Society (uncredited)
- Mr. Emmanuel (1944) — Herr Kahn
- Men of Two Worlds (1946) — Prof. Gollner
- White Cradle Inn (1947) — Joseph
- Portrait from Life (1949) — Professor Franz Menzel
- The Glass Mountain (1949) — Manager of Teatro La Fenice
- The Floating Dutchman (1952) — Otto
- The Green Carnation (1954) — Vittorio Miranda
- The Glass Cage (1955) — Pop Maroni (scenes deleted)
- Break in the Circle (1955) — Prof. Pal Kudnic
- Little Red Monkey (1955) — Prof. Leon Dushenko
- Cross Channel (1955) — Papa Moreau
- They Can't Hang Me (1955) — Professor Karl Kopek
- Zarak (1956) — Flower seller
- The Abominable Snowman (1957) — Lhama
- The Naked Truth (1957) — Scientist (uncredited)
- Davy (1958) — Winkler
- Operation Amsterdam (1959)
- The Man Who Could Cheat Death (1959) — Dr. Ludwig Weiss
- The Snake Woman (1961) — Dr. Murton
- The Password Is Courage (1962) — Old Man on Train (uncredited)
