= Lucky Jordan =

1942 film by Frank Tuttle

- Film poster
- Directed by: Frank Tuttle
- Screenplay by: Karl Tunberg; Darrell Ware
- Story by: Charles Leonard
- Produced by: Fred Kohlmar (associate producer)
- Starring: Alan Ladd; Helen Walker; Sheldon Leonard
- Cinematography: John F. Seitz
- Edited by: Archie Marshek
- Music by: Adolph Deutsch
- Production company: Paramount Pictures
- Distributed by: Paramount Pictures
- Release date: November 16, 1942
- Running time: 84 minutes
- Country: United States
- Language: English

Lucky Jordan is a 1942 comedy film directed by Frank Tuttle and starring Alan Ladd in his first leading role, Helen Walker in her film debut and Sheldon Leonard. The screenplay concerns a self-centered gangster who tangles with Nazi spies.

== Plot ==
During World War II, gangster Lucky Jordan is drafted and sent to a training base near his New York City office. He avoids the rigors of boot camp, hiding in the unit's canteen. One of the attendants, Jill Evans, reports him to the base colonel and he is sent to the stockade. Jordan escapes by stealing an army engineer's car. Outside the camp, Jordan is run off the road by two thugs, but they flee when Jill happens onto the scene. Jordan forces Jill to accompany him to the city. She responds by angrily discarding a briefcase containing army documents. After sneaking back into his headquarters, Jordan learns from disloyal underling Slip that the two men he encountered outside the base were after the briefcase Jill discarded. An enemy spy ring has offered $50,000 for it. After retrieving the briefcase and its information, Jordan orders Slip to arrange an exchange. Later, the thugs surprise Jordan, knock him unconscious, and run off with the papers.

Jordan tracks the spy ring to a botanical preserve on Long Island, where he finds Slip and a traitor named Kilpatrick holding the papers. Jordan grabs the documents and flees. The preserve's exits are immediately locked, but Jordan hides the papers and an explanatory note inside a man's umbrella. Jill, who has trailed Jordan to the preserve, asks a guard to use a phone to notify authorities of Jordan's location. The guard instead connects her to Kilpatrick, who deceives her by masquerading as a government agent, causing her to unwittingly assist in Jordan's capture.

Herr Kesselman, the spy ring's chief, oversees an interrogation of Jordan, who is threatened with torture and quickly invents a story about the location of the papers. After he is left alone with Kesselman and a lone guard, Jordan grabs the guard's gun. He then tells Kesselman he will surrender the papers to the government out of a sense of new-found patriotism. The FBI arrives and nabs the entire ring. Jill tells Lucky he will probably get a medal, but he is returned to the stockade to serve the remainder of his punishment.

== Cast ==
- Alan Ladd as Lucky Jordan
- Helen Walker as Jill Evans
- Sheldon Leonard as Slip Moran
- Mabel Paige as Annie
- Marie McDonald as Pearl, Lucky's secretary
- Lloyd Corrigan as Ernest Higgins
- Dave Willock as Angelo Palacio
- Russell Hoyt as Eddie
- John Wengraf as Herr Kesselman
- Miles Mander as Kilpatrick
- Clem Bevans as Gas station attendant
- Anthony Caruso as Hired Gun / Gardener
- Charles Cane as Sergeant
- George Meader as Little Man
- Virginia Brissac as Little Man's Wife
- Kitty Kelly as Vera Maggotti
- George Humbert as Joe Maggotti
- Al Hill as First Killer
- Fred Kohler Jr. as Second Killer

== Production ==
The film was based on an original screenplay by Charles Leonard, Prelude to Glory, about a gangster who joins the army. Paramount bought the script in March 1942 as a vehicle for Alan Ladd. Karl Tunberg and Darrell Ware were assigned to rewrite the screenplay.

Paulette Goddard was announced as Ladd's costar but eventually withdrew. Her part was taken by Helen Walker, who had arrived in Hollywood just one month before being cast. Walker had been signed by Paramount on the basis of her Broadway success in Jason. This was her first film role.

The film was Ladd's second since becoming a star, and the first for which he was billed alone above the title. The film was retitled Lucky Jordan in July 1942.

Ladd's briefcase in the film is the same that he had used as Raven in This Gun for Hire. He believed that the prop would bring good luck.

== Reception ==
In a contemporary review for The New York Times, critic Howard Thompson wrote: "[Ladd's] portrayal of Lucky Jordan will not disappoint, though the film leaves one wishing that Paramount had provided a worthier screen play, particularly since this is his first starring vehicle. This is not to say that there are not moments of sharp suspense in 'Lucky Jordan,' moments that are as toughly melodramatic as you are likely to encounter in a dozen such films. But the over-all effect is far from satisfying, for the plot is hackneyed and about as porous as a Swiss cheese."

The film broke the house attendance record at New York's Rialto Theatre in its first week of release.
