= The Man in Half Moon Street (play) =

- Original language: English
- Written by: Barré Lyndon
- Genre: Drama

Premiere
- Date: 20 February 1939
- Place: Pavilion Theatre, Bournemouth

The Man in Half Moon Street is a 1939 play by the British writer Barré Lyndon.

It premiered at the Pavilion Theatre in Bournemouth before beginning a West End run of 172 performances, first at the New Theatre before transferring to the Piccadilly Theatre. The cast included Leslie Banks, Ann Todd, Malcolm Keen, Leslie Dwyer, Michael Shepley and Frederick Piper.

== Adaptations ==
It was adapted into films on two occasions. The 1945 American film The Man in Half Moon Street by Paramount Pictures starring Nils Asther and the 1959 British production The Man Who Could Cheat Death starring Anton Diffring.

== Bibliography ==
- Goble, Alan. The Complete Index to Literary Sources in Film. Walter de Gruyter, 1999.
- Wearing, J.P. The London Stage 1930-1939: A Calendar of Productions, Performers, and Personnel. Rowman & Littlefield, 2014.
