= Murder in the Music Hall =

1946 film by John English

- Directed by: John English
- Written by: Arnold Lippschitz; Maria Matray
- Produced by: Herman Millakowsky
- Starring: Vera Ralston; William Marshall; Helen Walker; Nancy Kelly
- Cinematography: Jack A. Marta
- Edited by: Arthur Roberts
- Music by: Walter Scharf
- Production company: Republic Pictures
- Distributed by: Republic Pictures
- Release date: April 10, 1946
- Running time: 84 minutes
- Country: United States
- Language: English

Murder in the Music Hall is a 1946 American musical mystery film directed by John English and starring Vera Ralston, William Marshall and Helen Walker. The film involves a murder in Radio City Music Hall with The Rockettes as suspects.

The film's sets were designed by the art director Russell Kimball. It was re-released in 1951.

== Plot ==
Lila Laughton is a Rockette figure skater at Radio City Music Hall in New York City. She's dating orchestra conductor Don Jordan. Her ex-flame, producer Carl Lang, gets out of jail and visits her. Lang plays a song he wrote just for Lila, and demands that she appear in his new show or he'll tell the world that she poisoned her ex-lover Douglas five years ago. Frightened, Lila tells fellow performers Diane and Millicent and understudy Gracie about Lang's return. They sympathize, as all of them worked for him before.

When Lila and Don return to Lang's apartment to retrieve Lila's purse, they find him dead and a woman's glove on the floor. Lila and Don show the glove to the other girls, and Diane (who also dated Douglas) accuses Lila of murder. It turns out the glove belongs to Rita Morgan, wife of a local newspaper columnist. Don tells Rita that he has her glove, and she meets with Don and Lila. Rita, it turns out, is a former chorus girl who also worked for Carl and was being blackmailed by him.

Rita says a blind man named Mr. Winters can exonerate her. Don and Lila find Winter, but quickly discover he's an imposter. The real Winters says he was paid by a man, revealed to be Rita's husband George, to stay away from the apartment. George admits he entered the apartment disguised as Winters to steal the incriminating letters Lang had, but cannot identify the woman he saw running out.

Detective Wilson, who has been investigating the case, tells everyone to meet at the music hall. Lila overhears someone humming the song Carl Lang had composed, and realizes only the murderer would know the tune. Gracie is exposed as the killer: She was hiding in Lang's apartment when Lang and Lila arrived. She killed Lang in a jealous rage when she overheard him saying he loved Lila.

== Cast ==
- Vera Ralston as Lila Laughton (as Vera Hruba Ralston)
- William Marshall as Don Jordan
- Helen Walker as Millicent
- Nancy Kelly as Mrs. Rita Morgan
- William Gargan as Inspector Wilson
- Ann Rutherford as Gracie
- Julie Bishop as Diane
- Jerome Cowan as George Morgan
- Edward Norris as Carl Lang
- Paul Hurst as Hobarth
- Frank Orth as Henderson, the Stage Manager
- Jack La Rue as Bruce Wilton
- James Craven as Mr. Winters

== Bibliography ==
- McCarty, Clifford. Film Composers in America: A Filmography, 1911-1970. Oxford University Press, 2000.
