= My True Story (film) =

1951 film by Mickey Rooney

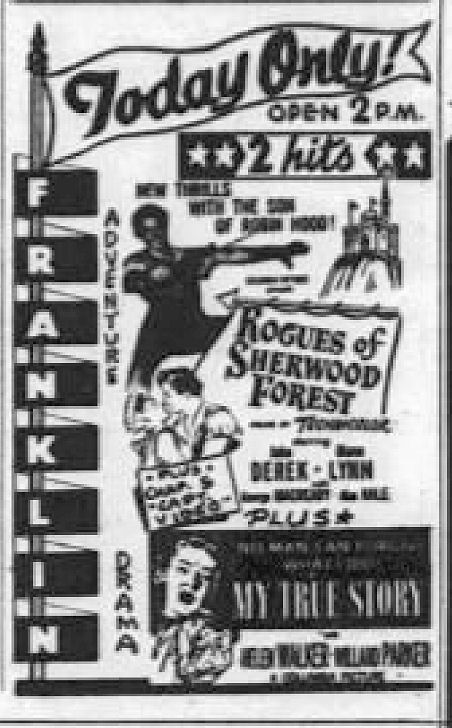
- Newspaper advertisement for Rogues of Sherwood Forest (1950) and My True Story
- Directed by: Mickey Rooney
- Written by: Brown Holmes; Howard J. Green
- Produced by: Milton Feldman
- Starring: Helen Walker; Willard Parker; Elisabeth Risdon
- Cinematography: Henry Freulich
- Edited by: Richard Fantl
- Music by: Mischa Bakaleinikoff
- Production company: Columbia Pictures
- Release date: June 14, 1951 (Los Angeles)
- Running time: 67 minutes
- Country: United States
- Language: English

My True Story is a 1951 American romantic crime drama film directed by Mickey Rooney about a female jewel thief. It is based on the radio series of the same title.

== Plot ==
Ann Martin is two years into a five-year prison sentence when she is granted a conditional parole. A job and new life in a small town await her, and candy-store owner Ed Praskins vows to produce regular reports on her conduct. She meets pharmacist Bill Phillips. Praskins stuns Ann by revealing that he is fronting a criminal operation run by George Trent, who is targeting wealthy widow Madame Rousseau, whose hidden cache of a valuable perfume oil could be worth a fortune.

Ann is given false references and becomes Madame Rousseau's assistant and companion. Trent has already planted a chauffeur there named Foster, whose inability to keep a secret costs him his life when Trent murders him. Ann is distraught, having developed a genuine fondness for Madame Rousseau, and learns that Bill is hiding the precious oil. Trent tries to steal it, but Bill, working undercover, is ahead of him.

Ann must return to prison, but Madame Rousseau promises her a job when she regains her freedom.

== Cast ==
- Helen Walker as Ann Martin
- Willard Parker as Bill Phillips
- Elisabeth Risdon as Madame Rousseau
- Wilton Graff as Trent
- Emory Parnell as Ed Praskins

== Production ==
Mickey Rooney was announced as the film's director in November 1950. The assignment, his first as a director, was the second of three films in his contract with Columbia Pictures. The first had been He's a Cockeyed Wonder (1950), in which Rooney starred with Terry Moore. The next project was scheduled to be a return to acting as a Pagliacci-style circus clown in a film titled Center Ring that did not materialize.

== Release ==
The film opened in Los Angeles on June 14, 1951 as the second feature to Best of the Badmen.
