= Robert F. Blumofe =

American film executive (1909–2003)

- Born: September 23, 1909; New York City, U.S.
- Died: July 22, 2003 (aged 93); Los Angeles, California, U.S.
- Education: Columbia College (BA); Columbia Law School (LLB)
- Occupations: Film executive; producer
- Spouses: Helen Walker (m. 1942; div. 1946) Doris Dowling (m. 1956; div. 1959) Joan Benny (divorced)
- Children: 1

Robert F. Blumofe (September 23, 1909 – July 22, 2003) was an American film executive and producer known for his work on Bound for Glory (1976), Pieces of Dreams (1970) and Yours, Mine and Ours (1968).

== Biography ==
A native of New York City, Blumofe graduated from Columbia College in 1930 and received his law degree from Columbia Law School.

Following graduation, he joined Paramount Pictures' legal staff in New York City before transferring to Hollywood. In 1952, he switched to TV and movie production at Revue Productions and left subsequently for United Artists. From 1953 to 1966, he was vice president in charge of production and West Coast operations.

He left United Artists in 1966 to become an independent producer. He was nominated for the 1969 Golden Globe Award for Best Motion Picture – Musical or Comedy for his work on Yours, Mine and Ours and shared a nomination for the Academy Award for Best Picture with Harold Leventhal for Bound for Glory, which won two Academy Awards in 1976.

He was director of American Film Institute's West Coast Operations from 1977 to 1981. He also served as vice chairman of the Motion Picture & Television Fund.

== Personal life ==
Blumofe was married three times. He was married to actress Helen Walker from 1942 to 1946. His second marriage was with Doris Dowling from 1956 to 1959. His third wife, Joan Benny, was the daughter of American vaudeville entertainer Jack Benny. The couple later divorced. As of 2020 their son, Robert D. Blumofe, is the executive vice president at Akamai Technologies.

Blumofe died on July 22, 2003, at age 93, and is survived by his son, a daughter, a stepson, a stepdaughter, and seven grandchildren.
