= Quarantine (1923 film) =

1923 film directed by Max Mack

- Directed by: Max Mack
- Written by: Rolf E. Vanloo
- Starring: Rudolf Lettinger; Helena Makowska; Loni Nest
- Cinematography: Otto Kanturek
- Production company: Internationale Film
- Release date: November 1923
- Country: Germany
- Languages: Silent; German intertitles

Quarantine (German: Quarantäne) is a 1923 German silent film directed by Max Mack and starring Rudolf Lettinger, Helena Makowska and Loni Nest.

== Cast ==
- Rudolf Lettinger as Professor Hudson
- Helena Makowska as Sein Frau
- Loni Nest as Kind
- Oskar Marion as Burns
- Robert Leffler as Hausarzt
- Robert Garrison as Matrose
- Hans Karl Georg as Hafeninspektor
- Kurt Katch as Hafenarzt
- Alfred Schmasow as Stellenvermittler
- Robert Scholz as Prinz
- Marga Lindt as Zofe
- Frau Wanna as Children's overseer
- Marian Alma as Servant
- Heinrich George

== Bibliography ==
- Hans-Michael Bock and Tim Bergfelder. The Concise Cinegraph: An Encyclopedia of German Cinema. Berghahn Books.
