= Impact (1949 film) =

1949 film noir drama directed by Arthur Lubin

- Theatrical release poster
- Directed by: Arthur Lubin
- Screenplay by: Jay Dratler; Dorothy Davenport
- Story by: Jay Dratler
- Produced by: Leo C. Popkin
- Starring: Brian Donlevy; Ella Raines; Charles Coburn; Helen Walker
- Cinematography: Ernest Laszlo
- Edited by: Arthur H. Nadel
- Music by: Michel Michelet
- Production companies: Harry Popkin Productions; Cardinal Pictures
- Distributed by: United Artists
- Release dates: March 19, 1949 (New York City); April 1, 1949 (United States)
- Running time: 111 minutes
- Country: United States
- Language: English
- Budget: $900,000

Impact is a 1949 American film noir drama film starring Brian Donlevy and Ella Raines. Directed by Arthur Lubin, it was shot entirely in Northern California, including scenes in Sausalito at Larkspur in Marin County, on Nob Hill in San Francisco, and throughout the Bay area. The screenplay was based on a story by film noir writer Jay Dratler. Charles Coburn, Helen Walker, Anna May Wong, Philip Ahn, and William Wright appear in support.

Lubin called it "a very, very good picture" with "a very nice cast."

== Plot ==
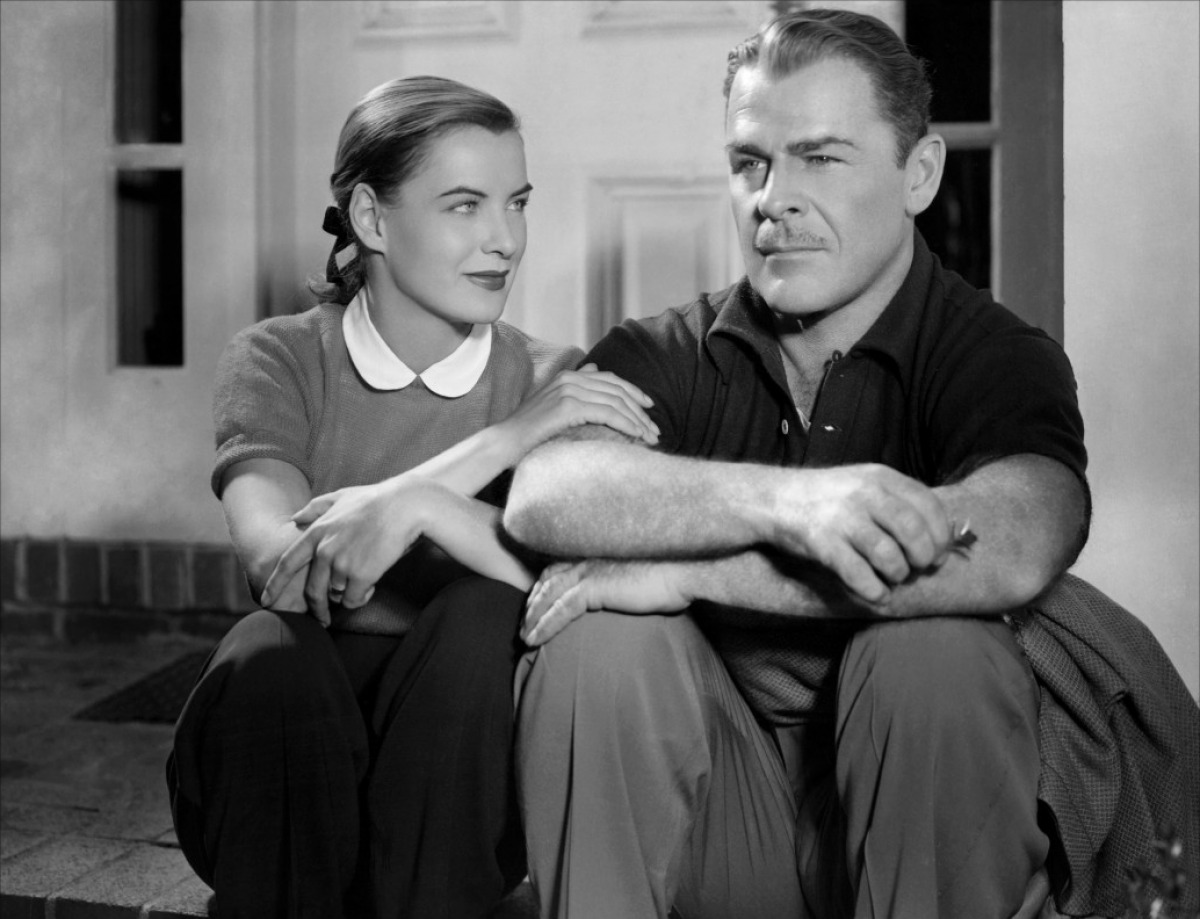
Ella Raines and Brian Donlevy in Impact

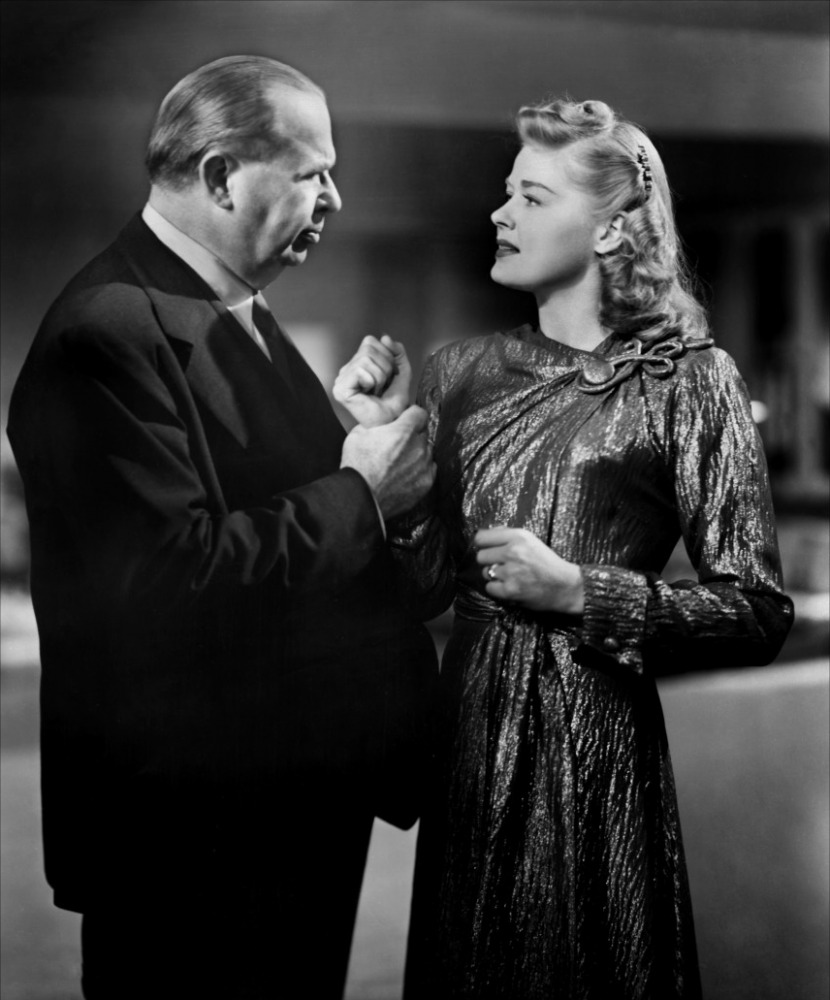
Charles Coburn and Helen Walker

Powerhouse millionaire industrialist Walter Williams gets his board of directors to bend to his will without ever breaking a sweat. He has a beautiful young wife, Irene, whom he dotes on, and a seemingly perfect life together in San Francisco.

Walt has business in Denver, and Irene accepts his invitation to go along and turn the scenic ride over the mountains via Lake Tahoe into a mini-vacation. At the last moment, she feigns illness, then asks him instead to give a ride to her poor "cousin" (ostensibly her aunt's favorite nephew) hitchhiking his way home to Evanston, Illinois. The "cousin" is actually her lover, Jim Torrence.

On a pull-out on a deserted roadside high in the Sierras, Torrence executes their murder plan, striking Williams directly on the head with a lug wrench, and then rolling his body down a steep embankment. Spooked by two moving van attendants stopping their truck to offer assistance with a seeming auto breakdown, he races off wildly in Williams' roadster, straight into a head-on collision with a gasoline tanker. Meanwhile, Irene leaves for a rendezvous with Torrence at a hotel in Oakland, booked under the assumed names of "Mr. & Mrs. Jack Burns"―but he never shows.

Bloodied and badly shaken, Walt regains consciousness before the moving van leaves. He manages to crawl onto its open tailgate before passing out. The next morning, he slips out of the van unseen and sees a newspaper announcing his demise. He ends up in the small town of Larkspur, Idaho. A skilled mechanic, he immediately gets a job at a local service station owned by Marsha Peters, a young war widow.

Back in San Francisco, police detective Quincy starts piecing together evidence against Irene. She is arrested as an accomplice in her husband's killing, potentially facing the death penalty.

Rooming as a boarder with Marsha and her mother, Williams enjoys life recovering in Larkspur, but furtively follows developments in San Francisco, wanting to let Irene pay for her treachery. Three months pass, and Marsha's mother discovers clippings in Williams' room that relate the story of his presumed murder. Swayed by Marsha's kindness and evident love for him, he eventually tells her the truth. She convinces him they will never have a future together unless he goes back and clears Irene. When he does, Irene, a consummate liar throughout, sees an opportunity and effortlessly turns the tables on Walt, accusing him of planning the entire thing to murder both her and Torrence.

The district attorney questions Williams' claims of amnesia to explain his three months' delay in reappearing while he was deemed murdered. When police investigators find the clippings of Irene's trial in Williams' room in Larkspur, Irene's claims that Williams plotted Torrance's murder gain credence. Irene is released, and Walt ends up on trial for his life. Desperate, Marsha turns to Quincy, who has harbored doubts and is open to helping her clear Walt. Nothing they produce can turn the tide until Su Lin, the Williams' former housekeeper, is found. She leads the pair to a hotel key Irene left in a jacket pocket in her apartment closet, which takes them to Torrence's suitcase, still checked at the Oakland hotel, revealing his Jack Burns alias and his connection to Irene.

Walter is freed and Irene is rearrested.

== Cast ==
- Brian Donlevy as Walter Williams
- Ella Raines as Marsha Peters
- Charles Coburn as Lt. Tom Quincy
- Helen Walker as Irene Williams
- Anna May Wong as Su Lin Chung
- Robert Warwick as Capt. Callahan
- Clarence Kolb as Darcy
- Art Baker as Eldredge - Defense Attorney
- William Wright as Prosecutor
- Mae Marsh as Mrs. King (Marsha's mother)
- Sheilah Graham as herself
- Tony Barrett as Jim Torrence
- Philip Ahn as Ah Sing
- Glen Vernon as Ed (as Glenn Vernon)
- Linda Leighton as Miss Revere - Telephone Operator (as Linda Johnson)
- Jason Robards, Sr. as Judge (as Jason Robards)
- Erskine Sanford as Dr. Henry Bender
- Ruth Robinson as Apt. Manager
- Lucius Cooke as Burke
- Tom Greenway as Moving Van Driver
- Ben Welden as Moving Van Helper
- Joel Friedkin as Uncle Ben
- Joe Kirk as Hotel Clerk
- William Ruhl as Fingerprint Expert (as Bill Ruhl)
- Mary Landa as Della - Walker's Secretary
- Harry Cheshire as Irene's Attorney

== Production ==
Arthur Lubin signed to direct in June 1948. Harry Popkin raised the project's budget of $900,000. Filming began in San Francisco on September 14.

Asian-American Anna May Wong made her first screen appearance since 1942—and second to last of her career. San Francisco gossip reporter Sheilah Graham appeared as herself, reading a news item about the case on the radio.

The cream-colored, luxury automobile that Brian Donlevy drives is a 1949 Packard Super Eight roadster.

=== Filming locations ===
To save money, virtually the entire film was shot on location. The Williams' Nob Hill penthouse home in San Francisco was shot at the historic Brocklebank Apartments at 1000 Mason Street. The actual town of Larkspur, California was used for filming the fictional town of Larkspur, Idaho. Several areas in and around Larkspur can be seen, including the Probert family's home and gas station at 234 and 238 Magnolia Avenue.

=== Product placement ===
In the 1940s, it was still uncommon for brand name products to be seen in movies, as product placement was not yet a popular—and lucrative—practice. The movie trade paper Harrison's Reports typically called attention to cases in which such products appeared on screen, and always took a stand against it. Although its review did not mention Williams' Packard or the Bekins moving truck, it flagged "advertising plugs worked in for such products as Pabst Blue Ribbon beer, Raleigh cigarettes, Coca-Cola, Mission Orange soda pop, Mobil gasoline, oil and tires, Gruen watches, and the trade name Rexall." It is unknown which if any of these appearances were paid product placement, and if not it would have been a major imposition in that era to ask local businesses to remove such signage for the sake of a few moments of footage in a movie without compensation, costing the production money rather than taking it in through placement.

== Reception ==
=== Critical response ===
At the time of release, the film critic for The New York Times, Bosley Crowther, panned the film's script and plot, writing, "If anyone seeing this picture is willing to string along with that as a fair definition of 'impact,' we can't vouch for the film's appeal to him. For it seems fairly obvious that the authors have geared their intellects to the suppositional level of that phony lexicon. And everything which happens in the picture is as cheaply opportunist and contrived as that arbitrary definition. You either swallow it whole—or you don't. Frankly, your correspondent doesn't."

In 2013 critic Gary W. Tooze praised Impact as the quintessential B film: "As far as 'modest' film noirs go, this is one of the best. A simple plot idea is twisted to the max for late 1940s audiences."

In 2019 Diabolique called it "a solid film noir with a decent cast and typically brisk handling; Lubin may not have been strong with horror, which depends heavily on mood, but with thrillers, which benefited from speed, he was fine."

This film has been shown on the Turner Classic Movies show, "Noir Alley," with Eddie Muller.

== See also ==
- List of films in the public domain in the United States
