= Murder, He Says =

1945 film by George Marshall

- Directed by: George Marshall
- Screenplay by: Lou Breslow
- Story by: Jack Moffitt
- Produced by: E.D. Leshin
- Starring: Fred MacMurray; Helen Walker; Marjorie Main
- Cinematography: Theodor Sparkuhl
- Edited by: Leroy Stone
- Music by: Robert Emmett Dolan
- Production company: Paramount Pictures
- Distributed by: Paramount Pictures
- Release date: June 23, 1945
- Running time: 94 minutes
- Country: United States
- Language: English

Murder, He Says is a 1945 American black comedy horror film directed by George Marshall and starring Fred MacMurray, Helen Walker, and Marjorie Main. The plot follows a murderous rural family and the hapless pollster who becomes entangled in their hunt for a cache of money. Filmed in the spring of 1944, it was held back for a year because Paramount prioritized releasing war-related films first, lest they suddenly become dated by the impending end of combat.

== Plot ==
Peter Marshall (Fred MacMurray), who works for the Trotter Poll ("like the Gallup Poll, but not as fast"), is sent out to find a missing co-worker, Hector Smedley. He goes to see the last family the man was supposed to interview, the nutty and murderous Fleagles. There he runs afoul of Mert and Bert Fleagle (both played by Peter Whitney), the gun-toting twin sons of Mamie Fleagle Smithers Johnson (Marjorie Main).

As matriarch of the clan Mamie insists that Peter, to escape death at the hands of Mert or Bert, pretend to be the boyfriend of jailed Bonnie Fleagle in order to gain the confidence of her dying grandmother (Mabel Paige). Grandma Fleagle has hidden $70,000 stolen by Bonnie and her now-executed father, but refuses to divulge where to her unwanted relations for a very good reason: she tells Pete that she has been poisoned by them. Before she dies, she teaches Pete a nonsensical song which is also known to Elany Fleagle (Jean Heather), Mamie's dimwitted daughter.

The Fleagles are sure Grandma told Pete where the money is hidden and keep him captive. Then, a woman claiming to be Bonnie shows up, also looking for the loot. When she gets Pete alone for questioning, she reveals she is actually Claire Matthews (Helen Walker). Her innocent father was maliciously implicated by Bonnie's father in the bank robbery. Pete wants to escape, now that they are alone, but Claire insists on staying. If she can retrieve the money, she can exonerate her father.

The Fleagles try to poison Claire at dinner, but Pete accidentally discovers that all but one of their plates have been poisoned (the poison glows in the dark); only the dish in front of Mamie's third husband, Mr. Johnson (Porter Hall), is safe to eat. Johnson slips away, but is soon found glowing and dead.

The uneasy situation is further complicated when the real Bonnie Fleagle (Barbara Pepper) breaks out of prison and comes for her money. She makes Pete sing the song and she understands the seemingly meaningless lyrics. Pete gets away, and he deciphers the clues hidden in the words, from which Claire finds a key to the safety deposit box. Soon, all of the Fleagles, including Mr. Johnson (who had faked his death), are chasing Pete and Claire through the various secret passageways of the house. The plucky pair are able to drop each of their pursuers into a hay baling machine, from which they emerge safely. The sheriff and his deputies then arrive rescuing Pete and Claire.

== Cast ==
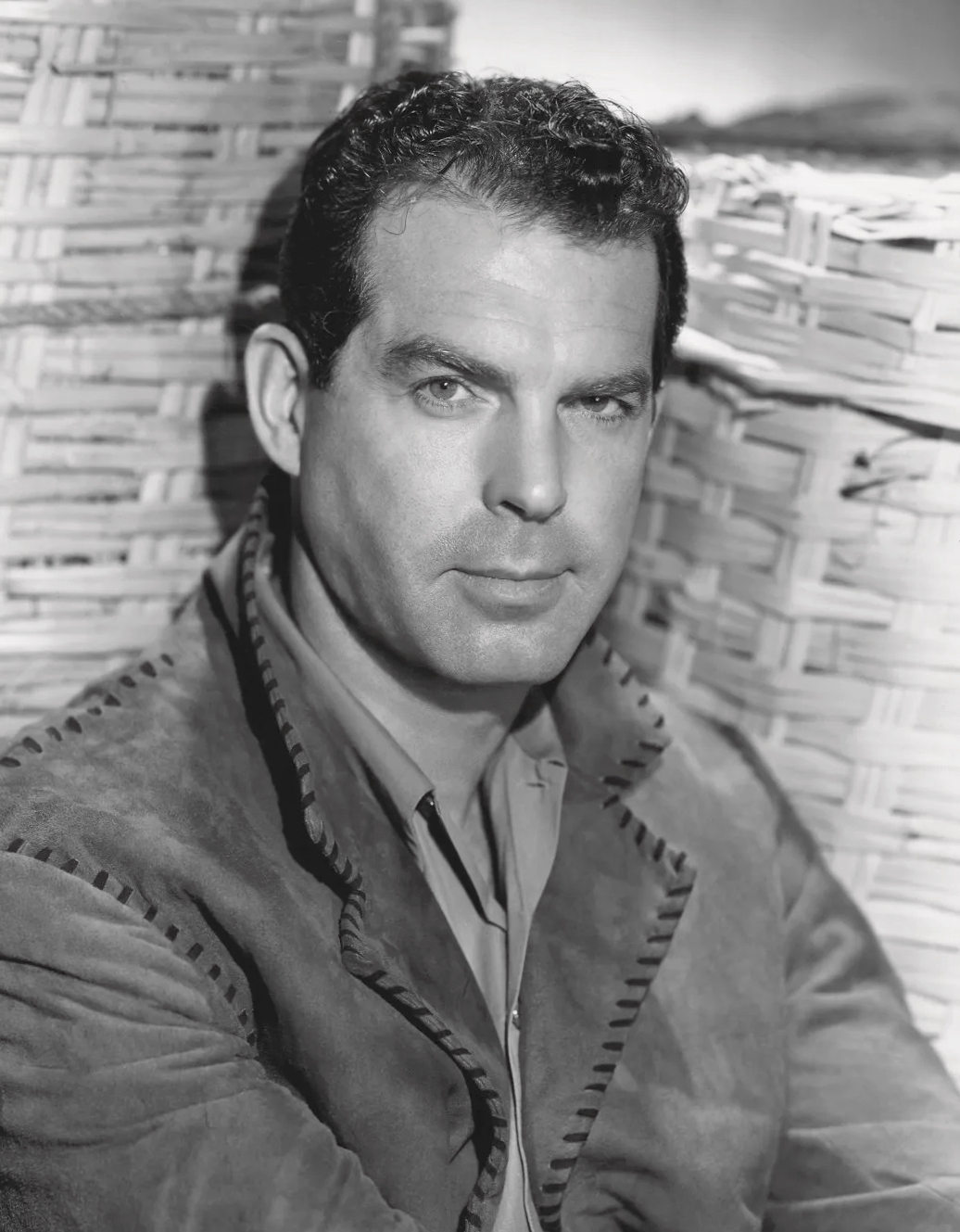
Fred MacMurray plays Pete Marshall, worker for the Trotter Poll, who comes looking for missing co-worker, Hector Smedley, at his last call, home of the murderous Fleagles.

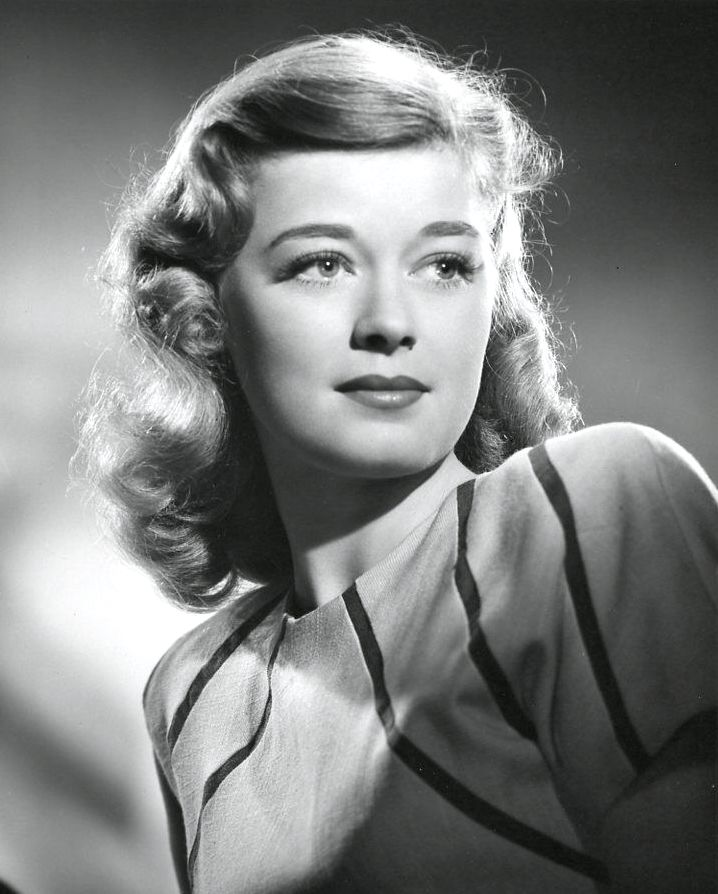
Helen Walker plays Claire Matthews, claiming to be Bonnie Fleagle, who is looking for Bonnie’s loot to clear her innocent father, implicated by Bonnie's father in a bank robbery.

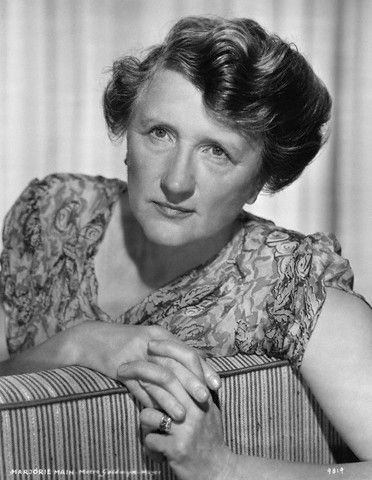
Marjorie Main plays Mamie Fleagle Smithers Johnson, matriarch, who insists Peter pretend to be the boyfriend of jailed Bonnie Fleagle to gain the confidence of her dying grandmother.

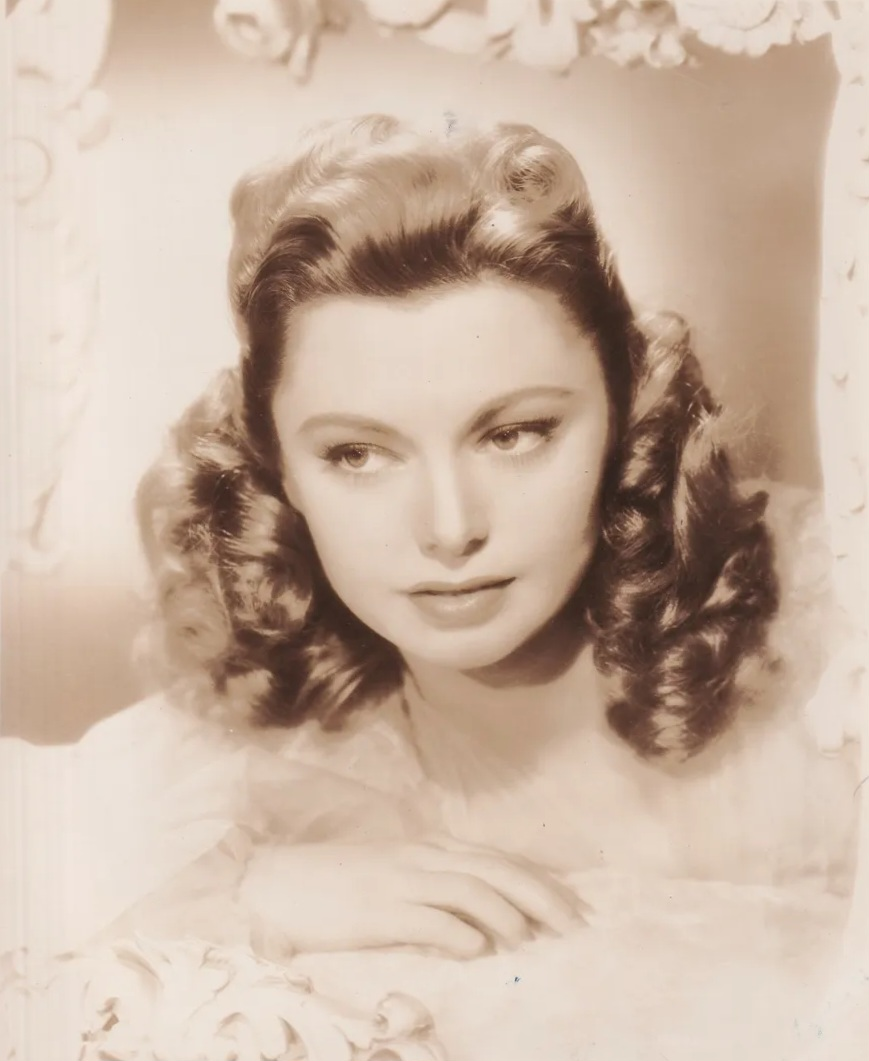
Jean Heather plays Elany Fleagle, to whom grandma Fleagle has taught a nonsensical song Elany constantly sings that makes sense only to Bonnie.

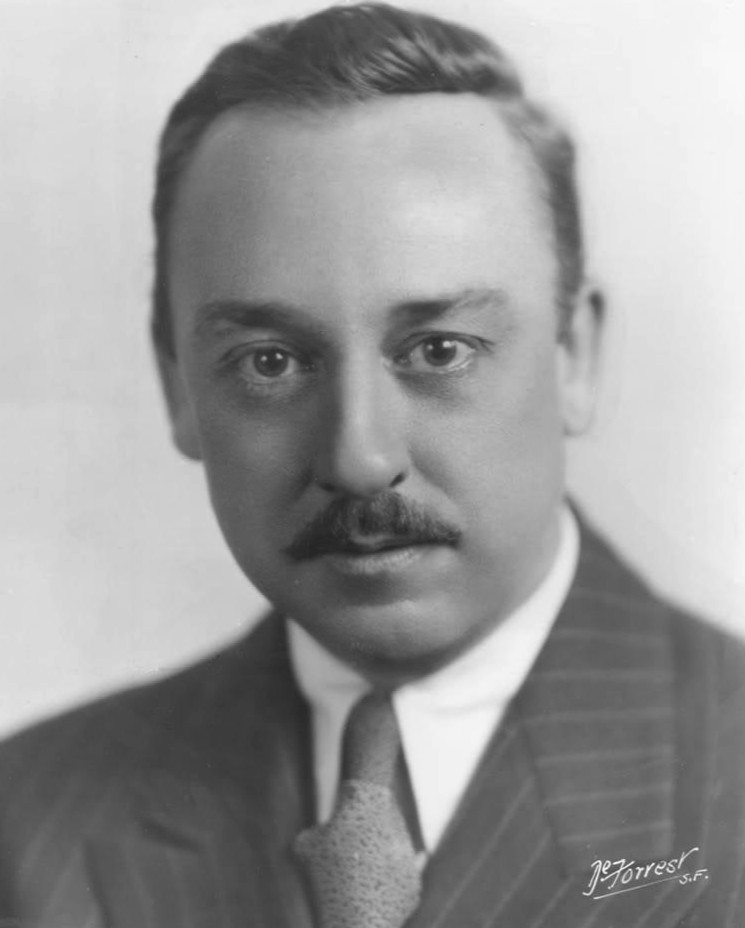
Porter Hall plays Mr. Johnson, Mamie Fleagle’s third husband who is scheming behind the scenes to steal Bonnie’s loot.

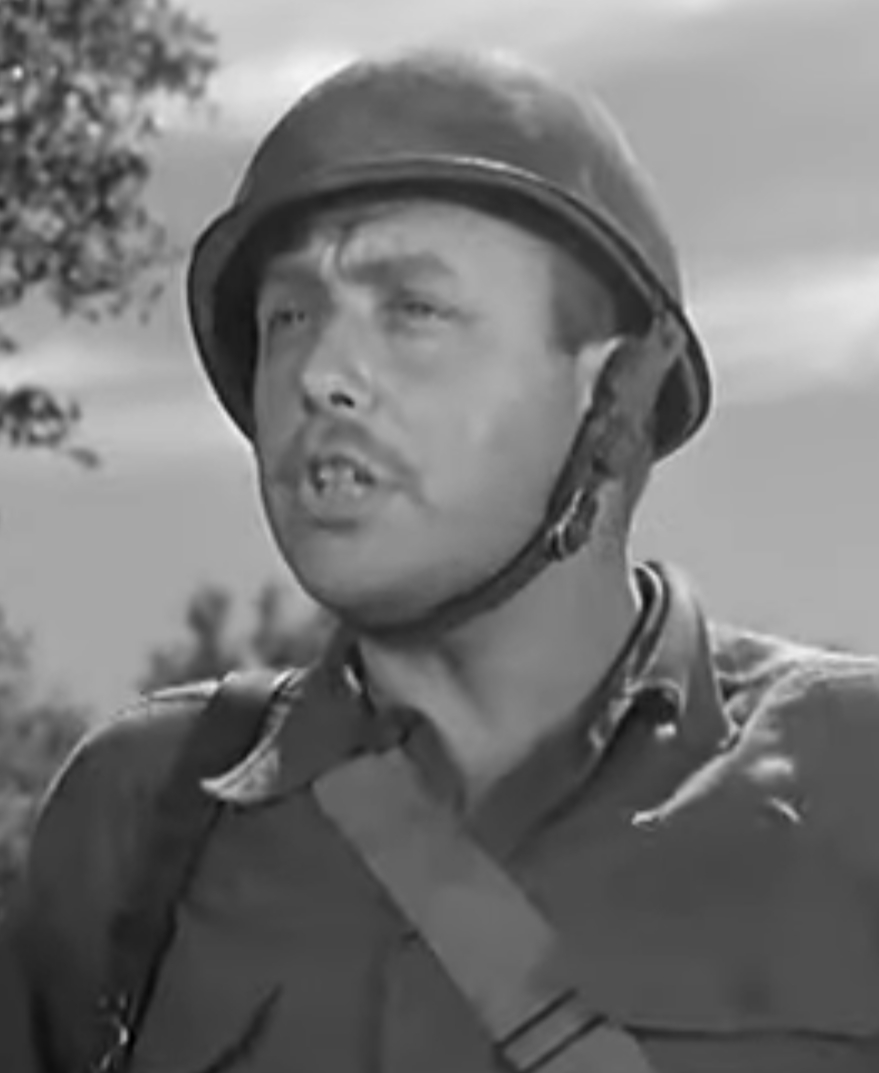
Peter Whitney plays both Mert and Bert Fleagle, Mamie's gun-toting twin sons, who keep Pete captive, sure Grandma told him where the money is hidden.

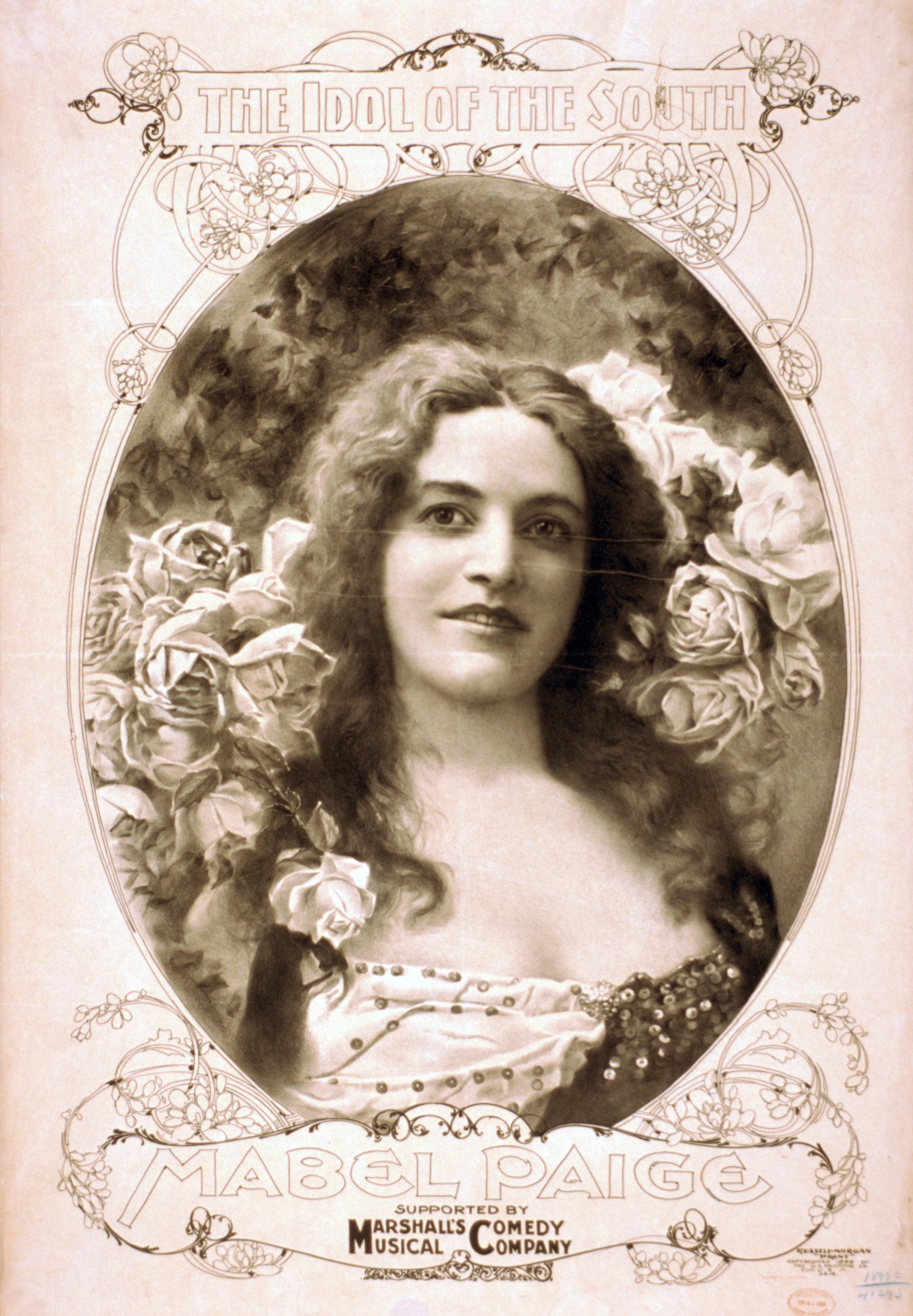
Mabel Paige (in 1899 portrait) plays Grandma Fleagle, who has hidden $70,000 stolen by Bonnie. Before she dies, she teaches a song that holds the clue to Pete.

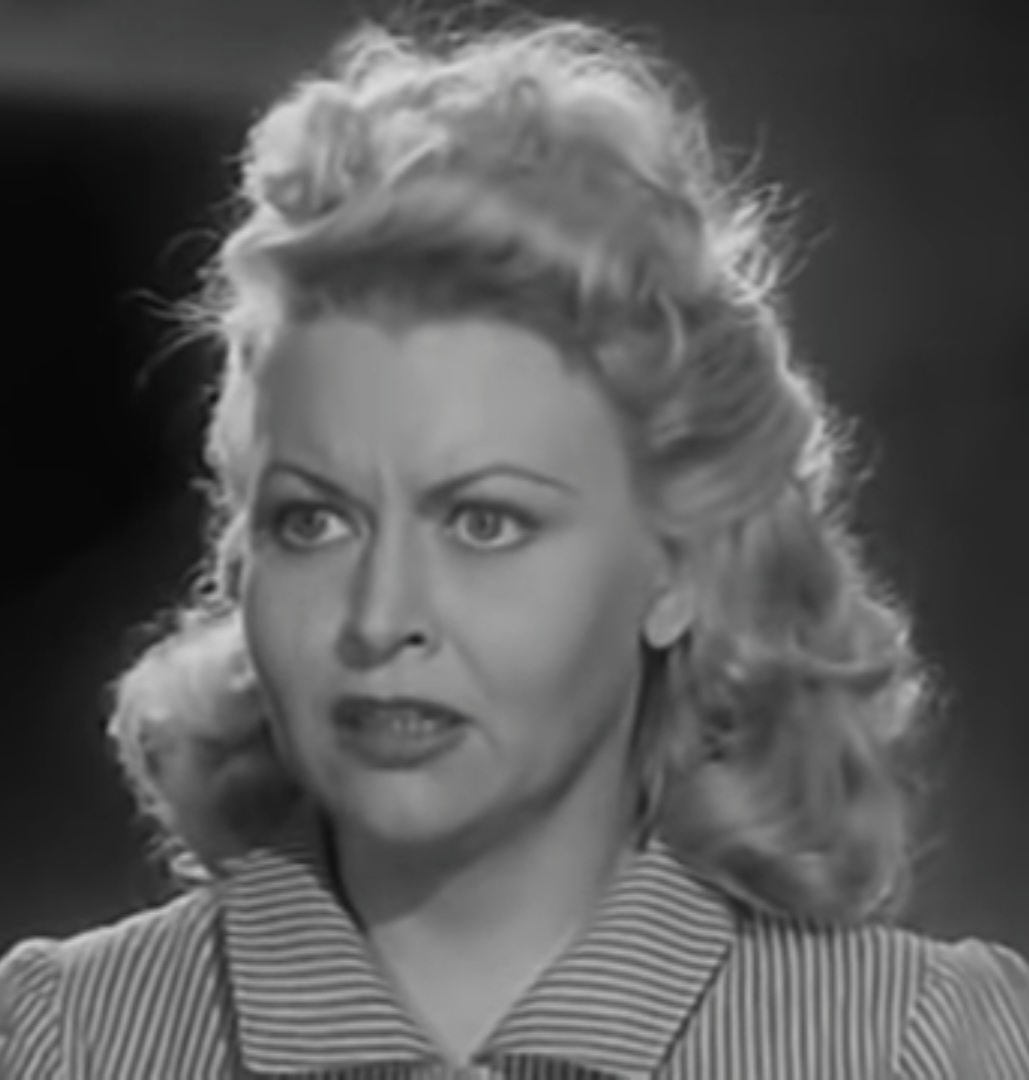
Barbara Pepper plays Bonnie Fleagle, who breaks out of prison and comes for her money. She makes Pete sing the song, and she understands the seemingly meaningless lyrics.

== Critical reception ==
In his May 19, 1945 review, New Yorker critic Wolcott Gibbs gave the film a lukewarm review: "Though essentially a demonstration of how cleverly thirty minutes of entertainment can be stretched out into ninety minutes of tedium, just by repeating everything three times, the picture was rather better than most of its species...

"All these wayward types are looking for a $70,000 bankroll said to have been concealed around the premises by a female cousin, at the moment supposed to be doing a little stretch for armed robbery...From here on things get more complex. Grandma dies, burning out like an old electric light, and the general impression is that she has confided the secret of the treasure to Mr. MacMurray, though actually the only clue is a scrap of song, stitched on a sampler and going:

Honors Flyzis
Income Beezis
Onches nobis
Inob Keezis

"Simple as this is to the students of ‘Mairzy Doats’, it takes Mr. MacMurray quite a while to figure out that the keys everyone is (sic) looking for are hidden in a knob on a chest. In fairness, however, it must be said that most of the time the industrious Fleagles are either shooting at him, trying to feed him phosphorus, or dropping him through trap doors. As you can see, a great deal of thought has gone into "Murder He Says," perhaps a little too much."

In his August 13, 2016 retrospective, Mountain Xpress critic Ken Hanke rated it 4/5 stars, with a more positive review: "One of those movies that never becomes one of the 'greatest' comedies, but it's sufficiently hysterical and funny that it ought to be better known."

“Breezy, unpretentious fun about a hapless pollster who finds himself at the mercy of a family of homicidal hillbillies. This is the kind of slick fun that studios turned out with pleasing regularity in the 1940s — unassuming, but intelligently crafted nonsense meant to offer sheer entertainment.”

“Every film book that mentions it tends to rave over it — perhaps too much — but it’s rarely revived. (Certainly Gene Wilder knows it since he copied one of its best physical gags in his 1986 old dark-house comedy Haunted Honeymoon.) The film is fast, MacMurray is an engaging lead and Marjorie Main is sheer perfection as the stinging matriarch. There’s a terrific gag with a plate of poisoned (glow-in-dark) food on a revolving table that would just about make the movie worth a look on its own. The only downside is that sure-to-stick-in-your-head song, but it’s worth it.”

In their 1970 film history, Hollywood in the Forties, Charles Higham and Joel Greenberg judged Murder, He Said "a neglected masterpiece and perhaps the Forties' funniest farce... A triumphant piece of nonsense."

== Bibliography ==
- Bordwell, David. Reinventing Hollywood: How 1940s Filmmakers Changed Movie Storytelling. University of Chicago Press, 2017.
