= Her Adventurous Night =

1946 film directed by John Rawlins

- Theatrical release poster
- Directed by: John Rawlins
- Screenplay by: Jerry Warner
- Produced by: Charles F. Haas
- Starring: Dennis O'Keefe; Helen Walker; Scotty Beckett; Fuzzy Knight; Milburn Stone; Tom Powers
- Cinematography: Ernest Miller
- Edited by: Edward Curtiss
- Music by: Milton Rosen
- Production company: Universal Pictures
- Distributed by: Universal Pictures
- Release date: June 5, 1946
- Running time: 76 minutes
- Country: United States
- Language: English

Her Adventurous Night is a 1946 American comedy film directed by John Rawlins and written by Jerry Warner. The film stars Dennis O'Keefe, Helen Walker, Scotty Beckett, Fuzzy Knight, Milburn Stone and Tom Powers. The film was released on June 5, 1946, by Universal Pictures.

== Cast ==
- Dennis O'Keefe as Bill Fry
- Helen Walker as Constance Fry
- Scotty Beckett as Junior Fry
- Fuzzy Knight as Cudgeons
- Milburn Stone as Cop #1
- Tom Powers as Dan Carter
- Benny Bartlett as Horace
- Charles Judels as Petrucci
- Betty Compson as Miss Spencer
