= To Please a Lady =

1950 film by Clarence Brown

- Theatrical poster
- Directed by: Clarence Brown
- Written by: Marge Decker; Barré Lyndon
- Produced by: Clarence Brown
- Starring: Clark Gable; Barbara Stanwyck
- Cinematography: Harold Rosson
- Edited by: Robert J. Kern
- Music by: Bronislau Kaper
- Distributed by: Metro-Goldwyn-Mayer
- Release date: October 5, 1950 (Indianapolis)
- Running time: 91 minutes
- Country: United States
- Language: English
- Budget: $1.8 million
- Box office: $2.9 million

To Please a Lady is a 1950 American romance film produced and directed by Clarence Brown and starring Clark Gable and Barbara Stanwyck. The climactic race scene was shot at the Indianapolis Motor Speedway.

== Plot ==
Racing driver Mike Brannan has a reputation for doing whatever it takes to win. Powerful nationwide columnist Regina Forbes interviews Mike just before a race and becomes annoyed at his brusque attitude. At the Newark track, Mike and competitor Joe Youghal fight for the lead. When a car crashes in front of them, Mike safely drives around it on the inside, forcing Joe to the outside. The result is a three-car wreck in which Youghal is killed. In her column the next day, Regina blames Mike for Joe's death and mentions a prior racing fatality in which he was involved. As a result, he is barred by nervous midget car racing circuit managers wishing to avoid bad publicity.

Unable to race, Mike has to sell his midget car. He becomes a star stunt driver for Joie Chitwood, performing dangerous stunts at auto circuses for $100 per show. When Regina's editor Gregg updates her about Mike, she shows unexpected interest and visits Mike to see how he is doing. He tells her that he has earned enough money to buy a championship car of his own and enter the big leagues, where Regina has no influence. She provokes him into first slapping and then kissing her. They begin a romantic relationship.

Mike is very successful on the racetrack, always finishing in the money, but his relationship with Regina is troubled. When a corrupt businessman whom Regina has been hounding is convicted and commits suicide rather than face 25 years in prison, she sees that she possesses some of the same ruthlessness that makes Mike so successful on the racetrack. She better understands him and begins to love him, although her doubts about whether his recklessness killed a man stands between them.

Mike qualifies for the Indianapolis 500 at the famous Indianapolis Motor Speedway. During the race, at a key moment reminiscent of what had happened at Newark with a wreck on the track, Mike waves a competitor through a gap large enough for only one of them. He attempts to avoid the wreck but his car flips and tumbles. He is rushed to the hospital but has only minor injuries. Regina rushes to the track hospital, tells him that she is proud of him and declares her love.

== Cast ==
- Clark Gable as Mike Brannan
- Barbara Stanwyck as Regina Forbes
- Adolphe Menjou as Gregg
- Will Geer as Jack Mackay
- Roland Winters as Dwight Barrington
- William C. McGaw as Joie Chitwood
- Lela Bliss as Regina's Secretary
- Emory Parnell as Mr. Wendall
- Frank Jenks as Press Agent
- Helen Spring as Janie
- Bill Hickman as Mike's Pit Crew
- Lew Smith as Mike's Pit Crew
- "Bullet" Joe Garson as Joe Youghal

== Production ==
MGM production head Dore Schary purchased the story, written by Marge Decker and Barré Lyndon, in June 1949 for $50,000. Although the studio had intended the film as a vehicle for Lana Turner, Barbara Stanwyck was instead signed in September.

The film's racing scenes were filmed at Carroll Speedway in Los Angeles. Dirt-track sequences were filmed at Arlington Downs in Texas. Stanwyck, in Indianapolis for the film's final scenes, attended the 1950 Indianapolis 500 race and delivered the traditional congratulatory kiss to winner Johnnie Parsons.

== Release ==
The film's world premiere was held in Indianapolis on October 5, 1950. Stanwyck took the stage and addressed the crowd before the film was shown.

== Reception ==
In a contemporary review for The New York Times, critic Thomas M. Pryor called the film an "unashamedly hackneyed melodrama" and wrote: "The thrills and spills and the ultimate display of good sportsmanship by Mike Brennan are the kind of stuff that makes a movie really move and leaves us all exhausted and happy."

According to MGM records, the film earned $2,061,000 in North America and $861,000 elsewhere, resulting in a profit of $47,000.

== Legacy ==
In 1951, future Indianapolis 500 winner and four-time American national champion Mario Andretti watched the film as a young boy in his native Italy, where it was titled Indianapolis, an event that introduced him to the race for the first time.

Footage from the film was featured in 1984's Gremlins, in a scene where the mogwai Gizmo mimicks the race scene.
