= Petronella (film) =

1927 film

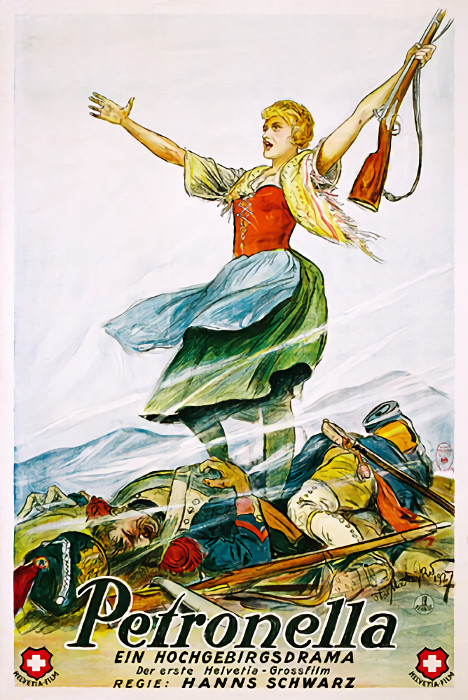
- Directed by: Hanns Schwarz
- Written by: Johannes Jegerlehner (novel); Max Jungk; Hanns Schwarz
- Starring: Maly Delschaft; William Dieterle; Oskar Homolka
- Cinematography: Alfred Hansen
- Music by: Walter Ulfig
- Production company: Helvetia-Film
- Distributed by: Helvetia-Film
- Release date: 28 November 1927
- Running time: 124 minutes
- Countries: Germany; Switzerland
- Languages: Silent; German intertitles

Petronella (German: Petronella - Das Geheimnis der Berge) is a 1927 German-Swiss silent historical film directed by Hanns Schwarz and starring Maly Delschaft, William Dieterle and Oskar Homolka.

The film's sets were designed by the art director Uwe Jens Krafft. It was shot at the Babelsberg Studios in Berlin.

== Cast ==
- Maly Delschaft as Pia Schwiek
- William Dieterle as Josmarie Seiler
- Oskar Homolka as Fridolin Bortis
- Theodor Loos as Pfarrer Imboden
- Frida Richard as Das Tschäderli
- Ernst Rückert as Gabarel Schwick
- Rudolf Lettinger as Pias Vater
- Georg John as Der alte Amros
- Fritz Kampers as Des Pfarrers Bruder
- Hedwig Wangel as Des Pfarrers Wirtschafterin
- Uwe Jens Krafft as Präsident Zumesch

== Bibliography ==
- Goble, Alan. The Complete Index to Literary Sources in Film. Walter de Gruyter, 1999.
