= Helen Walker =

American actress (1920–1968)

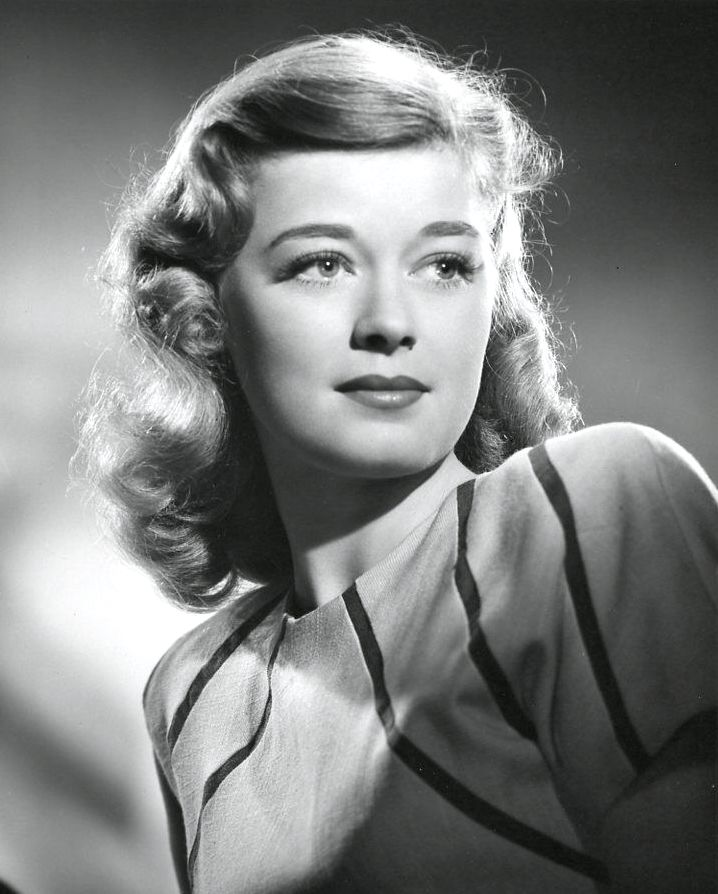
- Walker c. 1940s
- Born: Helen Marion Walker; July 17, 1920; Worcester, Massachusetts, U.S.
- Died: March 10, 1968 (aged 47); Los Angeles, California, U.S.
- Occupation: Actress
- Years active: 1942–1960
- Spouses: Robert F. Blumofe (m. 1942; div. 1946) Edward DuDomaine (m. 1950; div. 1952)

Helen Marion Walker (July 17, 1920 – March 10, 1968) was an American actress.

== Biography ==
=== 1920–1940: Early life ===
Helen Marion Walker was born July 17, 1920, in Worcester, Massachusetts, the daughter of Russell Walker and Irene Guertin. According to Walker, she grew up "quite poor." Her father, who managed a grocery store, died when she was six years old, and she and her two sisters went to live on a farm in Upton, Massachusetts.

Walker's initial acting experience came in high school, performing in school plays. She won a scholarship to the Erskine School of Dramatics in Boston and completed one semester of studies, but she withdrew after completing her first play, embarrassed by her performance.

=== 1941–1946: Career beginnings and film ===
After dropping out of the Erskine School of Dramatics, Walker began to appear in local stock theater. On Broadway, she portrayed Lisa Otis in Jason (1942). She married Paramount lawyer Robert Blumofe on November 19, 1942, in Tijuana, Mexico, but the marriage ended in divorce in 1946.

Walker made her film debut in 1942's Lucky Jordan, a comedy starring Alan Ladd. She earned a solid reputation playing leading roles in comedies as what she termed a "reactress,” i.e., a straight man to comic leads in films such as Brewster's Millions and Murder, He Says (both released in 1945).

According to Yvonne de Carlo, Walker, "the good natured but tough talking starlet," took Gail Russell "under her wing and introduced her to the tranquilizing benefits of vodka" when they were both under contract to Paramount. Russell subsequently became an alcoholic.

=== 1947–1955: Auto accident and career decline ===
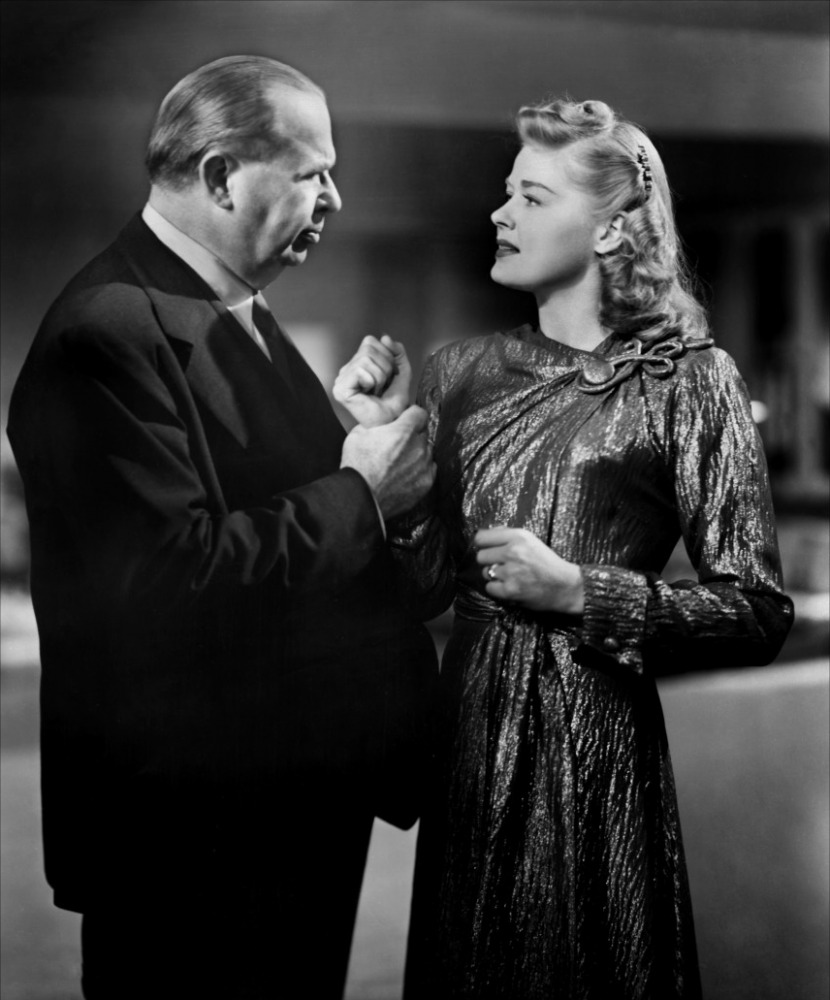
Charles Coburn and Helen Walker in Impact (1949)

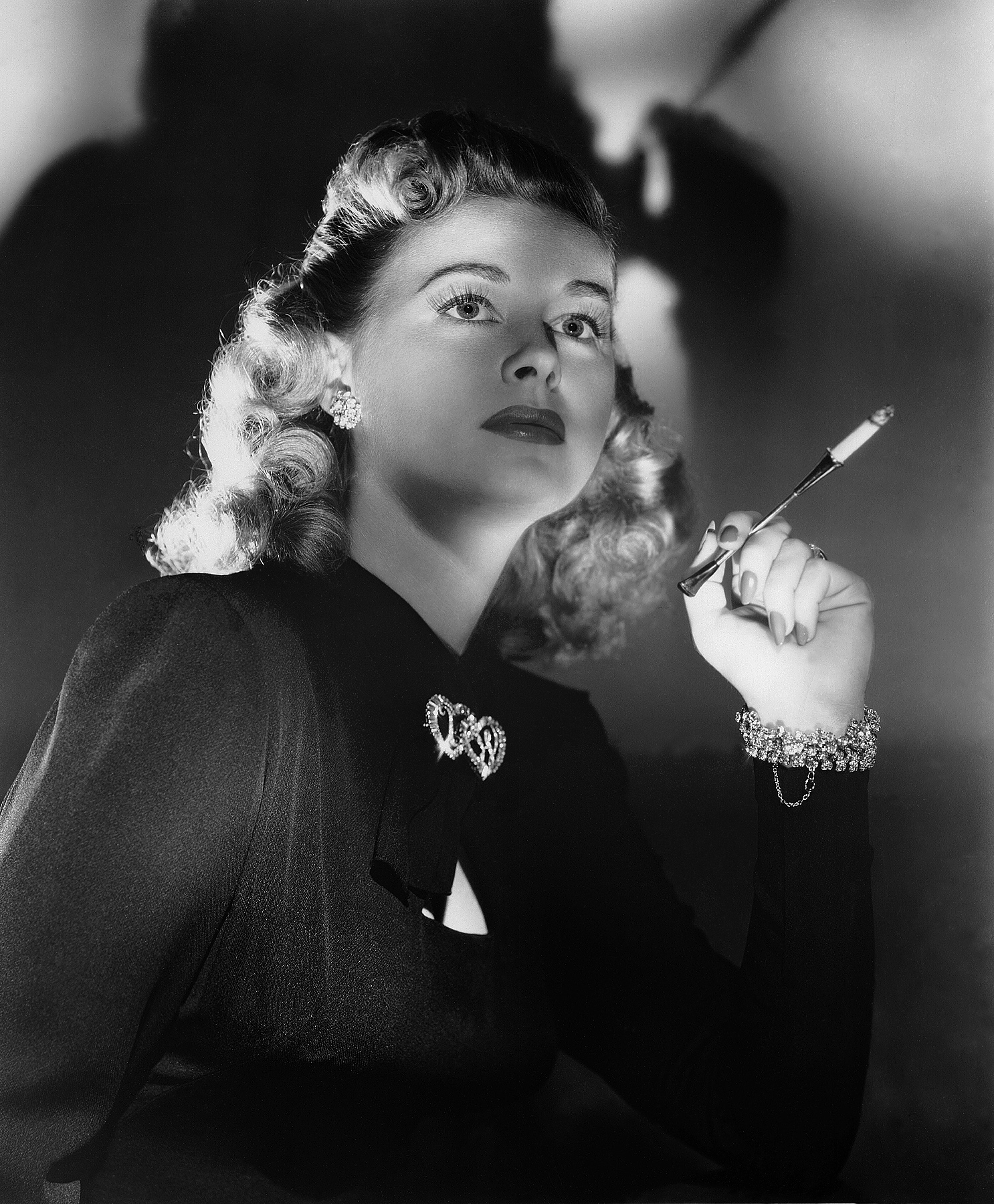
Helen Walker in a publicity still for Impact (1949)

Walker had just finished filming Her Adventurous Night (1946) and was set to begin Heaven Only Knows when an auto accident drastically disrupted her career. On December 31, 1946, while driving a convertible coupe belonging to director Bruce "Lucky" Humberstone from Palm Springs to Hollywood on U.S. Route 99, she picked up three hitchhikers: first, a soldier named Robert E. Lee, and later 18-year-old students Philip Mercado and Joseph Montalde. Near Redlands, California, the car slid off the road into a dirt division strip and rolled for more than 300 feet, flipping over as many as seven times and ejecting all four passengers. Lee was killed as his head struck the pavement, and Walker and the other two passengers were seriously injured. Walker suffered fractures to her pelvis and clavicle as well as a crushed foot, and spent more than a month in the hospital. Mercado, who had been thrown nearly 80 feet (24 m) from the car, sued Walker for $150,000, claiming that Walker was driving "like a fool," ignored his requests to slow down and diverted her attention from the road to ask for a cigarette just before the accident. Montalde sued Walker for $100,000. The police estimated that Walker had been traveling in excess of 80 mph (130 km/h) and a responding officer stated that he had smelled alcohol on her breath. A coroner's jury found that Walker had been driving negligently. She was charged with manslaughter for Lee's death, but the charge was later dismissed for lack of evidence. Walker was replaced in Heaven Only Knows by Marjorie Reynolds.

Despite the accident and her legal troubles, Walker continued to act, and she appeared in perhaps her most famous role as the duplicitous psychoanalyst in the original version of Nightmare Alley (1947) with Tyrone Power. She also took prominent roles in films such as Call Northside 777 (1948) with James Stewart, My Dear Secretary (1948) with Kirk Douglas and Impact (1949) with Brian Donlevy.

In 1950, Walker married department-store executive Edward DuDomaine, but the couple divorced in 1952.

Following starring roles in My True Story (1951) and Problem Girls (1953), Walker made her final film appearance in Joseph H. Lewis's film noir The Big Combo with Cornel Wilde in 1955. She retired from acting that year at the age of 35.

=== 1956–1968: Post-acting ===
In 1960, after Walker's house was destroyed by fire, several other Hollywood actresses held a benefit to assist her.

== Death ==
Walker died of cancer following a nine-year illness on March 10, 1968, in the North Hollywood section of Los Angeles, California at the age of 47.

== Filmography ==
=== Film ===
Year	Title	Role	Notes
1942	Lucky Jordan	Jill Evans	
1943	The Good Fellows	Ethel Hilton	
1944	Abroad with Two Yanks	Joyce Stuart	
1945	The Man in Half Moon Street	Eve Brandon	
1945	Brewster's Millions	Peggy Gray	
1945	Murder, He Says	Claire Matthews	
1945	Duffy's Tavern	Helen Walker	
1946	People Are Funny	Corey Sullivan	
1946	Murder in the Music Hall	Millicent	
1946	Cluny Brown	Elizabeth 'Betty' Cream	
1946	Her Adventurous Night	Constance Fry	
1947	The Homestretch	Kitty Brant	
1947	Nightmare Alley	Lilith Ritter	
1948	Call Northside 777	Laura McNeal	
1949	My Dear Secretary	Elsie	
1949	Impact	Irene Williams	
1951	My True Story	Ann Martin	
1953	Problem Girls	Miss Dixon	
1955	The Big Combo	Alicia Brown	

=== Television ===
Year	Title	Role	Notes
1955	The World of Mr. Sweeney	Marge	1 episode
1956	Dragnet		1 episode
1957	The 20th Century-Fox Hour	Shirley Larkin	1 episode
1960	Wichita Town	Sue, Scotty's girlfriend	1 episode
1960	Lock-Up	Janice Horton / Margaret Benedict	2 episodes (final appearance)

== Sources ==
- Wagner, Laura (2020). Hollywood's Hard-Luck Ladies: 23 Actresses Who Suffered Early Deaths, Accidents, Missteps, Illnesses and Tragedies. Jefferson, North Carolina: McFarland. ISBN 978-1-4766-3833-1.
