= Tom Seidmann-Freud =

Austrian painter and author (1892–1930)

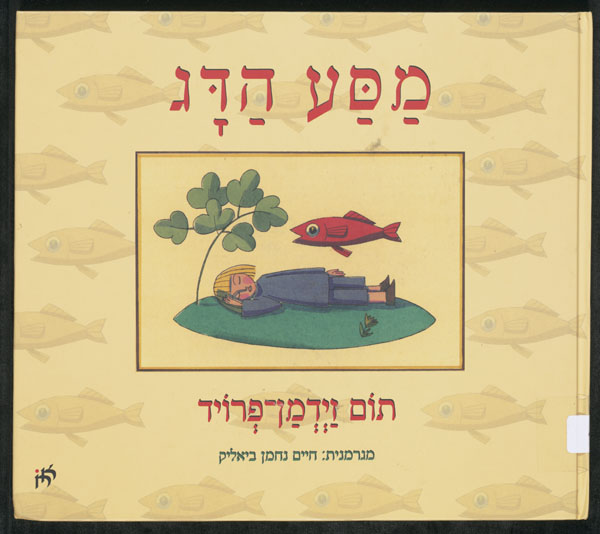
- Born: Martha Gertrud Freud; 17 November 1892; Vienna
- Died: 7 February 1930 (aged 37); Berlin
- Other names: Freud, Tom Seidmann-; Seidmann-Freud; Zaidman Froid, Tom; Seidmann-Freud, Martha Gertrud
- Spouse: Jakob Seidmann
- Children: Angela (Aviva) Seidmann
- Parents: Maurice (Moritz) Freud (father); Marie "Mitzi" Freud (mother)

Tom Seidmann-Freud (17 November 1892 – 7 February 1930) was an Austrian-Jewish painter, children's book author and illustrator.

== Biography ==
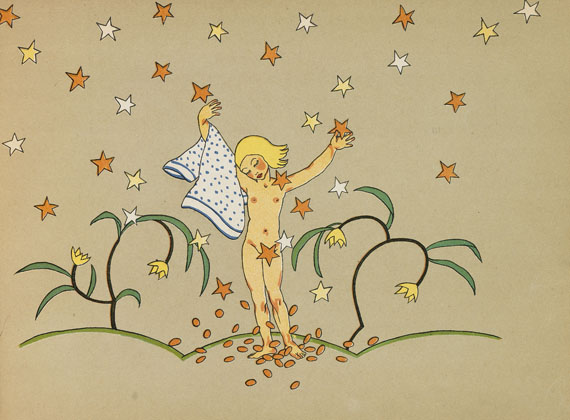
Tom Seidmann-Freud - Zeichnung aus 'Kleine Märchen'

Martha Gertrud Freud (later Tom Seidmann-Freud) was born in Vienna to Marie 'Mitzi' Freud, sister of psychoanalyst Sigmund Freud and her cousin and husband Maurice (Moritz) Freud. In 1898 the family moved to Berlin, where her father ran an import business. Seidmann-Freud had an older sister, Lily Freud, later Lily Marlé. Her younger brother Theodor drowned in Mäckersee, north of Berlin, in 1922. From the age of 15, she used the name Tom. In 1911, she moved to London to attend art school.

== Art career ==
Seidmann-Freud created Art Nouveau picture books. Her first successes were in 1914. When she returned to Berlin she studied in the School of applied Arts working with wood, stone and copper and experimenting with graphic design, drawing and decorative painting. She remained in Berlin throughout the First World War.

Between 1918 and 1920 Seidmann-Freud lived in Munich where she met writer Jakob 'Yankel' Seidmann. They married and had one daughter Angela in 1922. The pair co-founded Peregrin publishing house which focused on religious issues for Jewish immigrants. Seidmann-Freud picture book "Die Fischreise" was published by them in 1923. Seidmann-Freud also created play and transformation books for children aimed at encouraging children to read and write. The books were all published in Sütterlin script which has limited the distribution since 1949.

Seidmann-Freud illustrated children's books for the Hebrew poet Hayim Nahman Bialik. Towards this end, her husband founded the Ophir publishing house in July 1922. After Bialik left for Tel Aviv in 1924 and the Great Depression hit Germany in 1929, the company went bankrupt. Yankel Seidmann committed suicide. Deeply depressed, Seidmann-Freud took an overdose of sleeping pills on February 7, 1930. She is buried with her husband in the Berlin-Weissensee Jewish cemetery.

== After her death ==
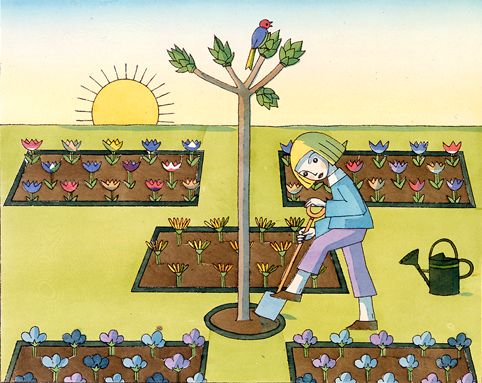
Fischreise

As Germany moved towards war and the situation became more dangerous for Jews, Seidmann-Freud's daughter, adopted by Lily and her husband Arnold Marlé was sent as part of a child transport to Palestine in 1938. There she took the Hebrew name Aviva where she had children herself and died in May 2011. Mitzi Freud was transported to Treblinka in 1942, where she was murdered in the Holocaust. Many of Seidmann-Freud's books were burned during that time.
