= The Homestretch =

1947 film by H. Bruce Humberstone

- Theatrical release poster
- Directed by: H. Bruce Humberstone
- Written by: Wanda Tuchock
- Produced by: Robert Bassler
- Starring: Cornel Wilde; Maureen O'Hara; Glenn Langan; Helen Walker; James Gleason; Henry Stephenson; Margaret Bannerman
- Cinematography: Arthur E. Arling
- Edited by: Robert L. Simpson
- Music by: David Raksin
- Production company: 20th Century Fox
- Distributed by: 20th Century Fox
- Release date: May 4, 1947
- Running time: 99 minutes
- Country: United States
- Language: English
- Box office: $2,350,000 (US rentals)

The Homestretch is a 1947 American drama film directed by H. Bruce Humberstone and written by Wanda Tuchock. The film stars Cornel Wilde, Maureen O'Hara, Glenn Langan, Helen Walker, James Gleason, Henry Stephenson and Margaret Bannerman. The film was released on May 4, 1947, by 20th Century Fox.

== Plot ==
Jock Wallace and Kitty Brant are rival thoroughbred horse breeders. He outbids her for a promising but injured horse, Abby R, paying $500 for it, angering the owner's niece, Leslie Hale, who feels the horse is worth much more.

Jock is attracted to Leslie and invites her to the Kentucky Derby to see another of his horses run. She is involved with a diplomat, Bill Van Dyke, and plans to join him in England for the coronation of King George VI, so Jock decides to pursue her there and enter his horse in the Ascot Gold Cup instead.

On a boat to Argentina, where he intends to race Abby R next, Jock charms Leslie and they are married. But the return of Kitty, combined with Jock's broken promises and racing debts, leads to the pregnant Leslie having a miscarriage and leaving him. Valiant, a horse Jock gave her as a gift, begins winning big races at Saratoga, Belmont, Hollywood Park and other major tracks. Jock gets a gift horse from Kitty and decides to run it against Valiant in the Kentucky Derby. Leslie's horse wins by a nose, but Jock wins back her love.

== Cast ==
- Cornel Wilde as Jock Wallace
- Maureen O'Hara as Leslie Hale
- Glenn Langan as Bill Van Dyke III
- Helen Walker as Kitty Brant
- James Gleason as Doc Kilborne
- Henry Stephenson as Don Humberto Balcares
- Margaret Bannerman as Ellamae Scott
- Ethel Griffies as Aunt Martha
- Tommy Cook as Pablo Artigo

== See also ==
- List of films about horse racing
