= The Amazing Dr. Clitterhouse =

1938 film by Anatole Litvak

- Theatrical release poster by Tom Chantrell
- Directed by: Anatole Litvak
- Screenplay by: John Wexley; John Huston
- Based on: The Amazing Dr. Clitterhouse; 1936 play by Barré Lyndon
- Produced by: Gilbert Miller; Robert Lord
- Starring: Edward G. Robinson; Claire Trevor; Humphrey Bogart
- Cinematography: Tony Gaudio
- Edited by: Warren Low
- Music by: Max Steiner
- Production company: Warner Bros. Pictures
- Distributed by: Warner Bros. Pictures
- Release dates: July 20, 1938 (NYC); July 30, 1938 (US)
- Running time: 87 minutes
- Country: United States
- Language: English

The Amazing Dr. Clitterhouse is a 1938 American crime film directed by Anatole Litvak and starring Edward G. Robinson, Claire Trevor and Humphrey Bogart. It was distributed by Warner Bros. Pictures and written by John Wexley and John Huston, based on the 1936 play The Amazing Dr. Clitterhouse, the first play written by short-story writer Barré Lyndon, which ran for three months on Broadway with Cedric Hardwicke after playing in London.

== Plot ==
Dr. Clitterhouse is a wealthy society physician in New York City who decides to research the medical aspects of the behavior of criminals directly by becoming one. He begins a series of daring jewel robberies, measuring his own blood pressure, temperature and pulse before, during and afterwards, but yearns for a larger sample for his study.

From one of his patients, Police Inspector Lewis Lane, he learns the name of the biggest fence in the city, Joe Keller. He goes to meet Keller to sell what he has stolen, only to find out that "Joe" is actually "Jo". The doctor impresses Jo and a gang of thieves headed by 'Rocks' Valentine with his exploits, so Jo invites him to join them, and he accepts.

Dr. Clitterhouse pretends to take a six-week vacation in Europe. As "The Professor", he proceeds to wrest leadership of the gang (and the admiration of Jo) away from Rocks, making him extremely resentful. When they rob a fur warehouse, Rocks locks his rival in a cold-storage vault, but Clitterhouse is freed by Butch, a gang member that Jo had assigned to keep watch on him. Afterwards, Clitterhouse announces he is quitting; he has enough data from studying the gang during their robberies, and his "vacation" time is up. He returns the gang to Rocks's control.

Rocks learns Dr. Clitterhouse's real identity and shows up at his Park Avenue office. Rocks tries to blackmail the doctor into using his office as a safehouse as they rob the doctor's own wealthy friends. Clitterhouse learns that Rocks will not let him publish his incriminating research, and also realizes that he has not studied the ultimate crime – murder – which will be the final chapter to his book. So, he gives a poisoned drink to Rocks, and he studies his symptoms as he dies. Jo helps dispose of the body in the river, but it is recovered and the poison is detected by the police.

The doctor is ultimately caught by his friend, Inspector Lane, and placed on trial. He insists that he did everything for purely scientific reasons and claims that his book is a "sane book" and that it is "impossible for an insane man to write a sane book". His determination to show that he is sane, and therefore willing to face the death penalty, convinces the jury to find him not guilty by reason of insanity.

== Cast ==
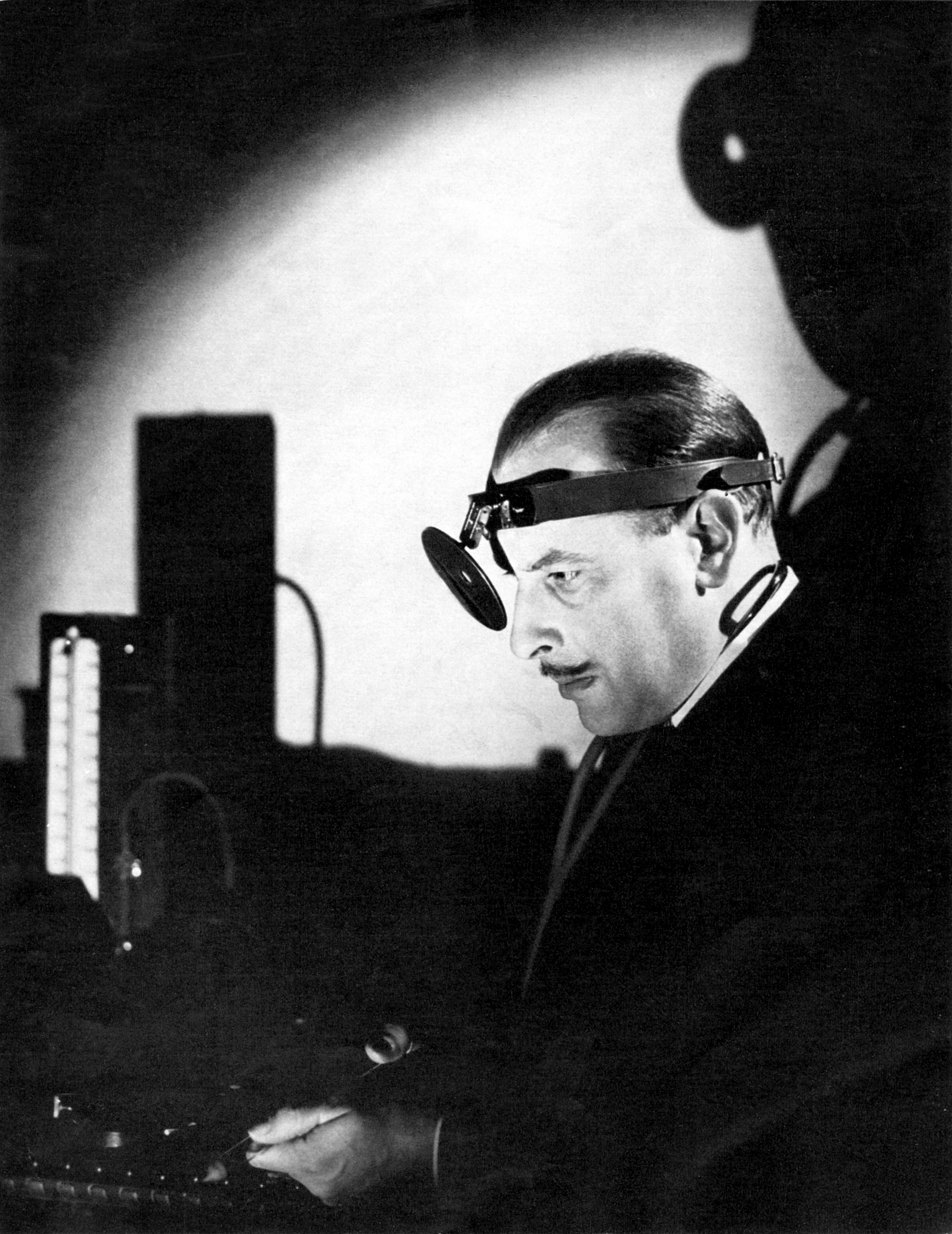
Cedric Hardwicke in the 1937 Broadway production of The Amazing Dr. Clitterhouse

- Edward G. Robinson as Dr. Clitterhouse
- Claire Trevor as Jo Keller
- Humphrey Bogart as "Rocks" Valentine
- Allen Jenkins as Okay
- Donald Crisp as Police Inspector Lewis Lane
- Gale Page as Nurse Randolph
- Henry O'Neill as Judge
- John Litel as Mr. Monroe
- Thurston Hall as Grant
- Maxie Rosenbloom as Butch
- Burt Hanlon as Pat ("Pal")
- Curt Bois as Rabbit
- Ward Bond as Tug
- Vladimir Sokoloff as Popus ("Poopus")
- Billy Wayne as Candy
- Robert Homans as Lt. Johnson
- Irving Bacon as Foreman of jury
- Mary Field as Millie

Cast notes

- Ronald Reagan's voice can be heard as a radio announcer, a job that Reagan held before he started as a film actor.
- Max "Slapsie Maxie" Rosenbloom was a boxer who converted his fame in the ring into a film career playing Runyonesque characters.
- Susan Hayward had a part in the film, but her scenes were deleted.

== Production ==
Barré Lyndon's play, The Amazing Dr. Clitterhouse, had been a success in London, and was produced on Broadway – where it opened on March 2, 1937, with Cedric Hardwicke in the title role, and ran for 80 performances, closing in May – in association with Warner Bros., but the studio had difficulty obtaining the movie rights even so, since Lyndon retained control of them. Carl Laemmle Jr., Paramount and MGM all bid for the rights, and Laemmle bought them for over $50,000. He then turned them around and sold them to Warners in return for the loan of Paul Muni for another adaptation of The Hunchback of Notre Dame, a film that was never made. Producer Robert Lord originally wanted Ronald Colman to play the part of Dr. Clitterhouse.

The film was in production from late February to early April 1938 at Warner Bros. Studios in Burbank. Clitterhouse was only Anatole Litvak's second film for Warners.

== Response ==
The Amazing Dr. Clitterhouse premiered in New York on July 20, 1938, and went into general American release on July 30. It was mostly well received. The review in Variety called it "an unquestionable winner" and said that Edward G. Robinson "is at his best" and Humphrey Bogart's "interpretation of the gangster chief...is topflight."

Bogart later said that the role of "Rocks" Valentine was one of his least favorite. Robinson and Bogart made five films together: Bullets or Ballots (1936), Kid Galahad (1937) with Bette Davis, The Amazing Dr. Clitterhouse (1938), Brother Orchid (1940) and Key Largo (1948) with Lauren Bacall, Claire Trevor and Lionel Barrymore. Key Largo was a reunion of Robinson, Trevor and Bogart from The Amazing Dr. Clitterhouse.
