= His Best Friend (1918 film) =

- Directed by: Uwe Jens Krafft
- Written by: Richard Hutter; Joe May
- Produced by: Joe May
- Starring: Max Landa
- Cinematography: Curt Courant
- Production company: May-Film
- Release date: 15 February 1918
- Country: Germany
- Languages: Silent; German intertitles

His Best Friend (German:Sein bester Freund) is a 1918 German silent film directed by Uwe Jens Krafft and starring Max Landa as the detective Joe Deebs.

== Cast ==
In alphabetical order

- Wilhelm Diegelmann
- Käthe Haack
- Max Landa as Joe Deebs
- Lina Paulsen as Tante Wilhelmine
- Hermann Picha

== Bibliography ==
- James Robert Parish & Kingsley Canham. Film Directors Guide: Western Europe. Scarecrow Press, 1976.
