= Rudolf Lettinger =

German actor (1865–1937)

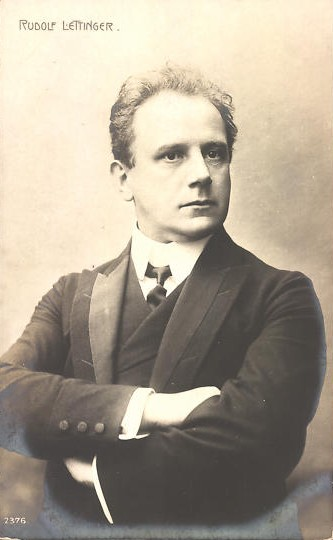
- Lettinger c. 1910
- Born: 26 October 1865; Free and Hanseatic City of Hamburg
- Died: 21 March 1937 (aged 71); Berlin-Schöneberg, Nazi Germany
- Occupation: Film actor
- Years active: 1883–1931

Rudolf Lettinger (26 October 1865 in Hamburg – 21 March 1937 in Berlin-Schöneberg) was a German stage and film actor. He made his stage debut in 1883 when he played the role of Kosinsky in Friedrich Schiller's drama The Robbers. Some of his more prominent roles in his prestigious stage career were Cyrano de Bergerac and Gessler in William Tell. He also worked with acclaimed stage director Max Reinhardt. In 1912, Lettinger played his first film role in Das Geheimnis von Monte Carlo. Lettinger appeared in over 90 films until 1931, mostly as a supporting actor. His best-known film is perhaps The Cabinet of Dr. Caligari (1920), where Lettinger portrayed Dr. Olsen.

== Selected filmography ==
- Das Geheimnis von Monte Carlo (1912)
- Ein Gruss aus der Tiefe (1915) - Vareno Ziehtochter Rawalla
- Das goldene Friedelchen (1916) - Hermann Strecker
- Irrende Liebe (1917) - Carl Coster, ehemaliger Bankdirektor
- Das Legat (1917) - Geldverleiher Rosen
- The Onyx Head (1917)
- Jugend. Die Furcht von der Wahrheit (1917) - Pens.Kapitän Voss
- Das Klima von Vancourt (1917)
- Halkas Gelöbnis (1918)
- Die Ehe der Charlotte von Brakel (1918)
- Der lebende Leichnam (1918)
- Der Prozeß Hauers (1918)
- Erträumtes (1918) - Ehemann der Freundin
- Das Buch Esther (1919) - Vorsteher des Jehudims
- Moderne Töchter (1919)
- The Ocarina (1919)
- Die Geliebte Tote (1919) - Professor Thorwaldsen
- Die schwarze Marion (1919)
- Das Schicksal der Carola van Geldern (1919) - Jack
- Harakiri (1919) - Karan
- Der Tempel der Liebe (1919)
- Opfer (1920)
- The Mistress of the World (1920, Part VIII) - Detective Hunt
- Hate (1920)
- The Spiders (1920, part 2) - John Terry, the King of Diamonds
- The Cabinet of Dr. Caligari (1920) - Dr. Olsen
- Frauenruhm (1920)
- Kaliber fünf Komma zwei (1920) - Julius Goldberg
- The Brothers Karamazov (1920) - Oberst
- Whitechapel (1920) - Komissar
- Madame Récamier (1920) - Jacques Récamier
- Das schwarze Amulett (1920)
- Napoleon and the Little Washerwoman (1920) - Napoleon Bonaparte
- Furcht vor dem Weibe (1920) - Handelsmarine-Matrose
- The Drums of Asia (1921) - van Daalen
- Night of the Burglar (1921)
- Der Gang durch die Hölle (1921) - Polizeikommissar Brown
- Ash Wednesday (1921)
- Barmaid (1922)
- Countess Walewska (1922) - Napoleon
- The Call of Destiny (1922)
- Nathan the Wise (1922) - Klosterbruder Bonafides - früherer Reitknecht Assads
- Victim of Love (1923)
- Maciste and the Chinese Chest (1923)
- Die brennende Kugel (1923)
- The Buddenbrooks (1923) - Kutscher Grobleben
- Der Tiger des Zirkus Farini (1923)
- Tragödie der Liebe (1923)
- Die Gräfin von Paris (1923)
- Quarantäne (1923) - Professor Hudson
- Count Cohn (1923) - Christian Schmidt
- The Great Unknown (1924)
- The Enchantress (1924)
- Kaddish (1924)
- Strong Winds (1924, part 9)
- Hunted Men (1924) - F. A. Mertens
- The Creature (1924)
- Playing with Destiny (1924) - Ortsgeistlicher
- The Man on the Comet (1925) - Benjamin
- Women of Luxury (1925) - Hermann von Benthien
- The Great Opportunity (1925)
- The Woman with That Certain Something (1925) - Justizrat Walter Zug
- The Circus Princess (1925)
- Bismarck (1925, part 1)
- The Hanseatics (1925)
- The Girl from America (1925) - Bombarth, Faktotum
- Am besten gefällt mir die Lore (1925) - Herr Funke
- The Fallen (1926)
- Young Blood (1926)
- Sword and Shield (1926) - General von Grumbkow
- The Good Reputation (1926)
- The Young Man from the Ragtrade (1926)
- Die Piraten der Ostseebäder (1927)
- Bismarck 1862–1898 (1927)
- Students' Love (1927)
- The Catwalk (1927) - Merkel - Ortsschulze
- The Most Beautiful Legs of Berlin (1927)
- The Holy Lie (1927)
- Da hält die Welt den Atem an (1927)
- Was die Kinder ihren Eltern verschweigen (1927) - Vater Wohlmuth
- Caught in Berlin's Underworld (1927) - Maroff
- King of the Centre Forwards (1927) - Jakob Meeling
- Petronella (1927) - Pias Vater
- Girls, Beware! (1928)
- Luther (1928) - Luthers Vater
- The Great Adventuress (1928) - Secretary
- Schneeschuhbanditen (1928)
- Volga Volga (1928)
- Die von der Scholle sind (1928)
- The Customs Judge (1929) - Justizwachmeister Böhm
- Madame Lu, die Frau für diskrete Beratung (1929)
- Beware of Loose Women (1929) - Wilhelm Hasse, Hotelier
- Es war einmal ein treuer Husar (1929) - Der Kronenwirt
- Freiheit in Fesseln (1930) - Schulze, Kahnführer
- Die Jugendgeliebte (1930)
- Witnesses Wanted (1930) - Fred Hiller
- Different Morals (1931) - Kommerzienrat Hormeyer
- Der Liebesarzt (1931) - Townbridge
- In Wien hab' ich einmal ein Mädel geliebt (1931)
- Emil and the Detectives (1931) - (final film role)

== Bibliography ==
- Jung, Uli & Schatzberg, Walter. Beyond Caligari: The Films of Robert Wiene. Berghahn Books, 1999.
