= The Man in Half Moon Street =

1945 film by Ralph Murphy

- Theatrical poster
- Directed by: Ralph Murphy
- Screenplay by: Garrett Fort (adaptation) Charles Kenyon (finished screenplay)
- Based on: The Man in Half Moon Street by Barré Lyndon
- Produced by: Walter MacEwen
- Starring: Nils Asther; Helen Walker
- Cinematography: Henry Sharp
- Edited by: Tom Neff
- Music by: Miklós Rózsa
- Production company: Paramount Pictures
- Distributed by: Paramount Pictures
- Release date: January 19, 1945 (New York City)
- Running time: 92 minutes
- Country: United States
- Language: English

The Man in Half Moon Street is a 1945 American melodrama horror romance science-fiction film about a man who retains his youth and cannot die, living throughout the ages. The plot is similar to that of Oscar Wilde's Picture of Dorian Gray and its 1945 film adaptation, although the source of the main character's eternal youth is medical and not supernatural. The film is based on a 1939 West End play of the same title by Barré Lyndon and stars Nils Asther and Helen Walker with direction by Ralph Murphy.

== Plot ==
Scientist Dr. Karell has discovered a treatment that can indefinitely prolong his life, using glands stolen from human victims. Having kept his achievement secret for more than a century of continuous youth, Karell must contend with the curiosity of his new girlfriend Eve, the increasing guilt of his colleague Dr. Van Bruecken, and a police investigation into his most recent murder.

== Cast ==
- Nils Asther as Dr. Julian Karell
- Helen Walker as Eve Brandon
- Reinhold Schünzel as Dr. Kurt van Bruecken
- Paul Cavanagh as Dr. Henry Latimer
- Edmund Breon as Sir Humphrey Brandon
- Morton Lowry as Alan Guthrie
- Matthew Boulton as Det. Insp. Ned Garth
- Brandon Hurst as Simpson-Butler

== Reception ==
In a contemporary review for The New York Times, critic Thomas M. Pryor called The Man in Half Moon Street "old stuff" and wrote: "Boris Karloff has been doing the same thing for years, only more flamboyantly. By playing the scientist with a restraint that almost makes him appear normal, Mr. Asther merely points up the incredibleness of the story all the more. Paramount has dressed the production with much better than average settings for this sort of potboiler fare and in his direction Ralph Murphy occasionally succeeds in establishing a measure of ominous tension. But the net result isn't anything to get excited about."

== Home media ==
Never released officially on DVD, the film was released on Blu-ray in 2023 by Imprint Films, Australia from a new 2K scan.
