= Uwe Jens Krafft =

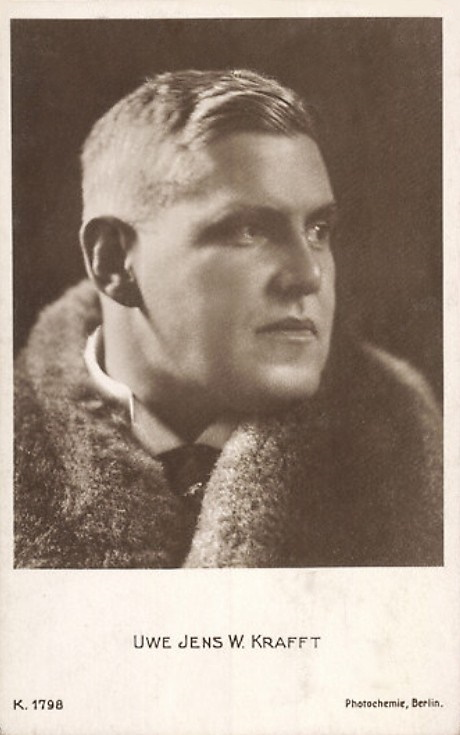
- Krafft c. 1920
- Born: Gustav Heinrich Walter Krafft; 23 December 1878; Kiel, German Empire
- Died: 12 December 1929 (aged 50); Berlin, Germany
- Occupations: Film director, actor
- Years active: 1917-1929

Uwe Jens Krafft (born Gustav Heinrich Walter Krafft; 23 December 1878 – 12 December 1929) was a German film director, actor, and screenwriter. He directed more than fifteen films from 1917 to 1929.

== Selected filmography as director ==
Year	Title	Notes
1928	Snowshoe Bandits	also actor
1927	The White Spider	
1927	Orient Express	
1927	Petronella	only actor
1923	The Tiger of Circus Farini	
1922	Maciste and the Javanese	
1919	The Mistress of the World	Parts 4,5 & 6
1918	His Best Friend	
