= Constance Howell =

Constance Howell (fl. 1877-1900) was a socialist and political novelist.

== Career ==
Howell was a socialist and her novels had a political dimension. Like contemporary political novelists, such as Clementina Black and Margaret Harkness, Howell's novels sometimes suffered from political critique. Her most well-known novel was A More Excellent Way (1888), which is thought to be semi-autobiographical. It recounts the "counter-conversion" of the protagonist Agatha Hathaway away from her upper class upbringing and Christianity and towards freethought and socialism. It was reviewed harshly in The Spectator, and To-day: Monthly Magazine of Scientific Socialism wrote that:

"...we made a vow never again to look into a book calling itself a Socialist novel. We broke that vow and we have been duly punished; and we hereby do our best to save our readers from a similar infliction by warming them on no account to read the latest literary effort of Constance Howell. It is a perfectly preposterous production."

Howell also wrote a series of three books for children during the 1880s, which explained elements of Western religious history from a critical freethinking perspective and all shared the subtitle "Written for Young Freethinkers". These were: Biography of Jesus Christ (1883), The After Life of the Apostles (1884) and History of the Jews (1885).

== Identity ==
Howell's dates of birth and death are currently unknown.

== Select publications ==
- Daisy and the Earl: A Novel (1877)
- Biography of Jesus Christ (1883)
- The After Life of the Apostles (1884)
- History of the Jews (1885)
- A More Excellent Way (1888)
- Many Days After: A Novel (1900)
