= Richard Hope (actor) =

British actor

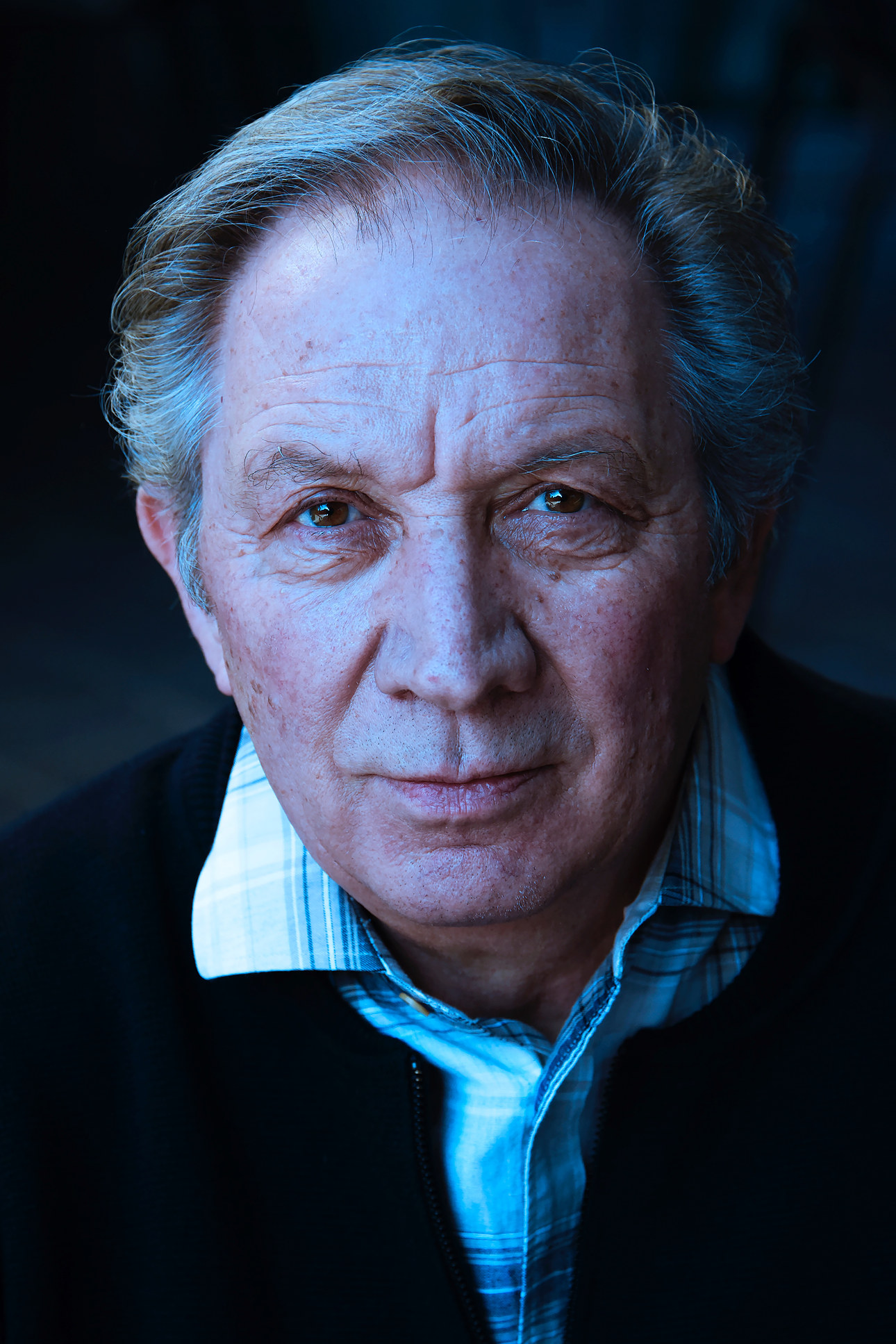
Richard Hope

Richard Hope is a British actor who gained recognition from Brideshead Revisited as the doltish junior officer, Hooper, under Jeremy Irons' charge. He is best known for playing Harris Pascoe in the UK TV drama Poldark. His theatre career includes portraying Pierre Bezukhov in War and Peace at the Royal National Theatre and having starred as Levin in an adaptation of Anna Karenina by Helen Edmundson. In 2015, he played Hector in The History Boys. In 2018–2019, he starred in the West End production The Woman in Black as Arthur Kipps.

== Career ==
In 1978, Laurence Olivier gave Hope his first professional TV part in an episode of Laurence Olivier Presents named Saturday, Sunday, Monday by Eduardo De Filippo. Hope worked with Olivier again in 1981 when he appeared in the first and last episodes of Brideshead Revisited, in which he played Lieutenant Hooper.

Hope played Ford Prefect in the first stage production of Douglas Adams The Hitchhiker's Guide to the Galaxy with Ken Campbell's The Science Fiction Theatre of Liverpool. He also appeared in their 22-hour epic The Warp and The Third Policeman. Campbell introduced him to Jérôme Savary. Hope made his first West End appearance with his musical theater company Le Grand Magic Circus in 1001 Nights at the Shaftesbury Theatre in 1980.

He was Bertozzo in the UK Tour of Accidental Death of an Anarchist (1979) with Alfred Molina for The Belt and Braces Theatre Company directed by Gavin Richards ending at the Half Moon Theatre in London. Richards played Molina's part when it transferred six months later to the Wyndham's Theatre in the West End.

In 1981, Peter Gill cast him in Don Juan and Much Ado About Nothing which started his long association with The National Theatre. In 1984, he joined the Richard Eyre / David Hare Company playing Bill Smiley in the premiere of Pravda with Anthony Hopkins before switching to the role of Eaton Sylvester in two extended revivals in the Olivier Theatre. This also included ensemble productions of The Government Inspector with Rik Mayall and Jim Broadbent and Tim McInnerny's Hamlet, in which he played Horatio. He met Simon McBurney at the National Theatre Studio, where Hope helped devise and develop The Visit and Street of Crocodiles for Théâtre de Complicité. 1988 saw The Visit production as part of the 'Théâtre de Complicité at the Almeida' season, before the theatre closed for refurbishment; the production was revised in collaboration with The National Theatre in the Lyttleton stage in 1991. The production was invited to Spoleto Festival USA .

Hope played Salto in Handmade Films' 1987 thriller Bellman and True, written and directed by Richard Loncraine, and Hull City A.F.C. fan Malcolm in Mark Herman's comedy See You At Wembley, Frankie Walsh which won the Student Academy Award. In Piece of Cake directed by Ian Toynton he was ‘Skull' Skelton and he played Mortimer Tundish in both series of Debbie Horsfield's comedy-drama The Riff Raff Element, with Celia Imrie and Nicholas Farrell.

In 1996, he returned to the National Theatre as Pierre Bezukhov in the Shared Experience joint production of Leo Tolstoy's War and Peace, adapted by Helen Edmundson and directed by Nancy Meckler and Polly Teale. In 1998, he starred in another Tolstoy adaptation by Helen Edmundson, playing Levin in the Shared Experience production of Anna Karenina. Hope was associate director of this production which toured internationally, including runs at the Brooklyn Academy of Music and the Lyric Theatre. Clive Barnes of the New York Post described it as ‘One of the true highlights of a lifetime of theatre-going'.

During 2000, under coach Geoff Thompson (author of Real Punching), Hope learned to wrestle for Jim Cartwright's Hard Fruit at the Royal Court Theatre, directed by James Macdonald. During a performance of Hard Fruit, Hope broke his wrist when he hit a punch post that was missing its padding; he continued the run of the show with an "authentic" bandaged hand. With Mark Rylance he was one of the six actors in Mike Alfreds' Cymbeline at Shakespeare's Globe Theatre in 2001. In 2002, the Royal National Theatre staged Simon Bent's adaptation of John Irving's A Prayer for Owen Meany with Aidan McArdle as the title character and Hope as John Wheelwright.

Hope has been in several police dramas: Superintendent Harold Spence in Agatha Christie's Poirot, Barry Purvis for two series of Murder Investigation Team and semi-regular Rod Jessop, the local headmaster, in The Bill.

His first role in a musical was as Max Kellerman in Dirty Dancing at the Aldwych Theatre in 2010, staying for eighteen months. He played Horst Ehmke in Paul Miller's revival in Sheffield of Michael Frayn's play Democracy, which transferred to London's Old Vic Theatre in 2012. This was the third Frayn play he had performed in, having toured the UK in Donkeys' Years and Noises Off.

Hope returned to the Almeida Theatre as Gabriel York in Andrew Bovell's When the Rain Stops Falling in 2009 and in 2012 as Albany in King Lear with Jonathan Pryce. In 2014, he played Queen Elizabeth I in the UK premiere of Sarah Ruhl's stage adaptation of Virginia Woolf's Orlando at the Royal Exchange with Suranne Jones, directed by Max Webster. In 2015, Hope played Hector in Kate Saxon's production of Alan Bennett's The History Boys in the Sell A Door Theatre Company UK Tour. From 2015 to 2016, Hope continued his long-standing collaboration with Helen Edmundson, playing Sidney Godolphin in the original Royal Shakespeare Company production of her original play Queen Anne, starring Natascha McElhone. In 2017 Queen Anne transferred to the Haymarket Theatre with Romola Garai.

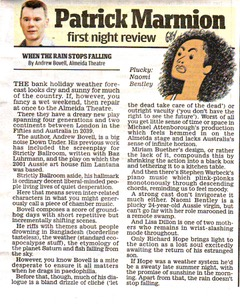
22nd May 2009, First Night Review - Richard Marmion: “Only Richard Hope brings light to the action as a lost soul excitedly awaiting the return of his estranged son”. “If Hope was a weather system he’d be a sweaty late summer night, with the promise of sunshine in the morning. Apart from that, the rain doesn’t stop falling”.

He played recurring characters Malohkeh and Bleytal (Silurians) in Doctor Who, and has recorded several related audios with Big Finish, including Dr Who - Doom Coalition 3: "Absent Friends", which won the BBC Audio Drama Award 2017.

From May 2018 through March 2019, Richard played Arthur Kipps in The Woman in Black by Susan Hill adapted into a stage play by Stephen Mallatratt at the Fortune Theatre, London. Richard had already played Jerome in the 2004 BBC Radio 4 version directed by John Taylor as a Fiction Factory production.

In 2019, he returned as Harris Pascoe, Ross Poldark's banker and friend, for his fifth season of Poldark with screenplay by Debbie Horsfield. He previously worked with Horsfield on The Riff Raff Element. He also appeared in an episode of Casualty.

In 2024 Hope returned to Royal Court Theatre as Wally Saunders in Giant by Mark Rosenblatt, directed by Nick Hytner, with John Lithgow, Elliot Levey, Rachael Stirling, Romola Garai and Tessa Bonham Jones.

== Acting credits ==
=== Film ===
Year	Film	Role	Other notes
1980	Breaking Glass	Audition musician	
1980	Bloody Kids	Policeman #2	
1981	The French Lieutenant's Woman	Third Assistant Director	
1984	Scandalous	Young Detective	
1984	Singleton's Pluck (aka Laughterhouse)	Hubert	
1985	Plenty	Alistair	
1987	See You At Wembley, Frankie Walsh	Malcolm (lead)	Director Mark Herman won Oscar for Best Short Film
1987	Bellman and True	Salto	
1990	Antonia and Jane	Norman Beer	
1992	Swords at Teatime	Dennis	Short film
1995	The Last Post	Man (lead)	BAFTA nominated for Best Short Film
1995	Feast of July	Squire Wyman	
1998	The Sea Change	Alistair	
1998	McLibel	Judge	
2001	My Brother Tom	Jessica's dad	
2002	The Honeytrap	Detective Fowler	
2004	Bloom	Richard Neap	Short film
2004	Sergeant Pepper	Christopher Fröhlich	
2005	Chromophobia	Simon Whitemore	
2013	Mr. Morgan's Last Love	American philatelist	
2018	Finding Your Feet	Care home manager	
2019	The Village in the Woods	Charles	
2024	The Secret Assistants	Henry	
2025	Cleaner	Alastair Lawson	

=== Television ===
Year	Title	Role	Other notes
1975	By Common Consent	Security Official	
1977	Secret Army	Sgt. Hose	
1978	Laurence Olivier Presents	Attilio	Episode: "Saturday Sunday Monday"
1978	People Like Us	Teacher	
1978	Crown Court	PC Collins	
1978	Margie and Me	Policeman	
1979	Heartland	Steve	
1981	Brideshead Revisited	Lieutenant Hooper	
1983	Scene	Exton	Episode: "Simulation Exercise"
1983	Wayne and Albert	Ambulanceman	
1984	Wuffer	Wuffer	
1984	December Flower	Doctor	
1986	Love and Marriage	Alan	Episode: "The Clinger"
1988	Burning Ambition	Dick Trout	
1988	Dogplant	Owen	
1988	Piece of Cake	'Skull' Skelton	
1989	Victoria Wood	Alan Warburton	Episode: "We'd Quite Like to Apologise"
1989–1990	Frederick Forsyth Presents	Donald Spry	2 episodes
1990	Children Crossing	Tom	
1990	Happy Families	Mr Jump/Captain Salt/Mr Cash etc.	2 series
1991	Itch	Geoff	
1991	The Bill	Dyas	
1991	Boon	Sgt Keogh	
1993	The Riff Raff Element	Mortimer Tundish	2 series
1995	Tears Before Bedtime	Stuart	
1995	Band of Gold	Richard	
1995	Peak Practice	Roy Shearer	
1995	The Vet	Colin	
1996	Jackanory	Storyteller	
1997	Bramwell	Talbot	
1997	A Perfect State	Simon	
1998	Casualty	Edmund White	
1998	Children of the New Forest	Heatherstone	
1998	The Demon Headmaster	Professor Tim Dexter	2 series
1999	Midsomer Murders	Gordon Brierley	
1999	Reach for the Moon	Mr Fenton	
2000	Rhona	Doug	
2000	Happy Birthday Shakespeare	Colin	
2000	Beef Encounter	Prosecutor	
2000	Midsomer Murders	Gordon Brierley	Episode "Judgement Day"
2000	In Deep	Dr Kingswood	
2001	High Stakes	Peter Harrison	
2001	Judge John Deed	Peter Taylor	
2001	A Is for Acid	Dr. Archie Henderson	
2001	McCready and Daughter	Tony Smith	
2002	William and Mary	Dr Currie	
2002	The Bill	Russell	
2002	The Forsyte Saga	Gradman	
2002	Holby City	Roger Stapleton	
2002	Tipping the Velvet	Mr. Astley	
2003	Foyle's War	Frank Vaudrey	Episode: "Funk Hole"
2003	Canterbury Tales	Arty's father	Episode: "The Pardoner's Tale"
2003–2005	Murder Investigation Team	DS Barry Purvis	2 series
2003	Murder in Suburbia	Patrick	
2003	Murder City	George Collins	
2003	Heartbeat	James Vincent	
2004	The Government Inspector	Richard Sambrook	
2004	New Tricks	Brownlow	
2004	Trial of the King Killers	John Bradshaw	
2005	Doctors	Colin Wheelan	
2005	Silent Witness	Dr Morrie Sanders	Episode: "Mind and Body"
2005	Riot at the Rite	Grigoriev	
2006	The Wild West	Judge Spicer	
2006	The Thieving Headmistress	Andy Pert	
2006	The Shell Seekers	George Chamberlaine	
2006–2007	The Bill	Rod Jessop	
2006–2008	Poirot	Superintendent Harold Spence	Episodes: "Mrs McGinty's Dead", "Taken at the Flood"
2007	Midsomer Murders	Neville Hayward	Episode: "They Seek Him Here"
2008	EastEnders	Ted Hubbard	
2009	Holby City	Christopher Gamble in "Running on Empty"	
2010–2011	Doctor Who	Malohkeh	Episodes: "The Hungry Earth", "Cold Blood", "The Wedding of River Song"
2012	Doctor Who	Bleytal	Episode: "Dinosaurs on a Spaceship"
2013	Doctors	Sebastion Norris	Episode: "House Arrest"
2013	Holby City	Father Mattew Sinclair	Episode: "Journey's End"
2013	The Smoke	Eric Springer	Episode: "Jamais KO"
2013	The Great Train Robbery	DCS Malcolm Fewtrell	Episode: "The Copper's Tale"
2014	Father Brown	Sir St. John Pryde	Episode: "Pride of the Prydes"
2014	The Lost Honour of Christopher Jefferies	Exam Board Official	
2015	And Then There Were None	Inspector Maine	
2016	Unforgotten	James Gregory	Series 2
2017	Broadchurch	Arthur Tamworth	Series 3
2015–2019	Poldark	Harris Pascoe	5 series
2019	Casualty	Joe	
2021	Doctors	Edwin Thomas	Episode: "Legend"
2022	Mandy	Jeffery Betts	
2022	The Chelsea Detective	Andrew Knightley	
2022	The Ipcress File	Treasury Official	
2022	Top Boy	District Judge	
2022	Gentleman Jack	Rawdon Briggs	
2022	The Walk-In	Judge	
2022	1899	Dr Reginald Murray	
2023	Hijack	Philip Paxton	
2023	Endeavour	Ted/Sergeant Wilkins	

=== Theatre ===
Year	Play	Role	Theatre
1976	Romeo and Juliet	Peter & Acting ASM	Shaw Theatre
1977	Henry IV, Part 1	Gadshill / Sir Richard Vernon	Shaw Theatre
1977	Mother Courage	Young Soldier and Young Peasant	Birmingham Rep
1977	The Seed	Jerry	Birmingham Rep
1978	The Warp	Dr. Snarkle, Paul Crawford, Ed Gale and many others	ICA and Roundhouse / Ken Campbell's Science Fiction Theatre of Liverpool
1978	The White Deer	Tocko	Unicorn Theatre
1978	The End Is Nigh	Jesus	New End Theatre / Ken Campbell
1979	Accidental Death of an Anarchist	Bertozzo	Belt and Braces Theatre Company / UK Tour
1979	The Hitchhiker's Guide to the Galaxy	Ford Prefect	ICA / Ken Campbell's Science Fiction Theatre of Liverpool
1980	One Thousand and One Nights	Sultan, Emperor of the Desert, Baba Mustafa	Le Grand Magic Circus / Shaftesbury Theatre
1980	The Third Policeman	MacCruskeen	ICA / Ken Campbell's Science Fiction Theatre of Liverpool
1981	Much Ado About Nothing	George Seattle	National Theatre
1981	Don Juan	Peter	National Theatre
1981	School for Clowns	Puff	Half Moon Theatre / Sylvester McCoy & Ken Campbell
1982	Candida	Lexy	National Theatre / British Council Tour of India
1985	Pravda	Bill Smiley (1985)/Eaton Sylvester (1986)	National Theatre
1985	The Government Inspector	The Postmaster	National Theatre
1986	Hamlet	Horatio	National Theatre
1988 & 1991	The Visit	The Mayor	Almeida Theatre/National Theatre / Complicité
1990	Don Gil of the Green Britches	Caramanchel	The Gate
1991	Street of Crocodiles	Father	National Theatre Studio/Complicité
1991	The Gentleman from Olmedo	Tello	The Gate
1993–1998	Anna Karenina	Levin / Associate Director	Shared Experience / UK & World Tours
1994	Betrayal	Jerry	West Yorkshire Playhouse
1995	The Park	Wolf	Royal Shakespeare Company
1996	War and Peace	Pierre	National Theatre/Shared Experience
2000	Hard Fruit	Sump	Royal Court Theatre
2001	Cymbeline	Cymbeline	Shakespeare's Globe Theatre
2002	A Prayer for Owen Meany	John Wheelwright	National Theatre
2002	Life After George	Duffy	Duchess Theatre
2007	Donkeys' Years	Norman Tate	Sonia Friedman Productions/UK Tour
2008	Noises Off	Freddie Fellowes	Ambassador Theatre Group / UK Tour
2008	The Hour We Knew Nothing of Each Other	The Wanderer + 25 other parts	National Theatre
2009	When the Rain Stops Falling	Gabriel York	Almeida Theatre
2010–2011	Dirty Dancing	Max Kellerman	Aldwych Theatre
2011	There Is a War	Field Commander Goodman	National Theatre
2011	The Swan	Russell	National Theatre
2012	Democracy	Horst Ehmke	Sheffield Theatres / transferred to The Old Vic
2012	King Lear	Duke of Albany	Almeida Theatre
2014	Orlando	Queen Elizabeth I	Royal Exchange, Manchester
2015	Shostakovich's Hamlet	Narrator and Performer	City of London Sinfonia
2015	The History Boys	Hector	Sell A Door Theatre Company/UK Tour
2015–2017	Queen Anne	Sidney Godolphin	Royal Shakespeare Company, Stratford and Haymarket Theatre London
2018–2019	The Woman in Black	Arthur Kipps	Fortune Theatre London
2024	Giant	Wally Saunders	Royal Court Theatre

=== Audio work ===
Year	Production	Character	Company	Notes
1995	People Like Us	The Vicar (Rev Andrew Treverton in The Vicar)	BBC	
1996	The Constant Prince	Don Juan de Silva	BBC	
1997	To the Wedding		BBC / Théâtre de Complicité	
2002	Diary of a Provincial Lady	The Husband	Watchmaker Productions	
2004	What Hetty Did	Mr. Bertwistle	First Writes	
2004	Woman in Black	Jerome	Fiction Factory	
2005	Murder on the Leviathan	Dr. Truffo	Goldhawk Essential Productions	
2007	Man in the Water	Narrator	Pier Productions/BBC	
2009	Ruth	Guardian, Thomas, Mr. Jones	First Writes	
2012	Chronicles of AIT-The Saxon Stones	Thurgis	Fiction Factory / BBC	
2013	41 Rue Monge	Narrator	Christine Hall / BBC 4	
2013	Chronicles of AIT-The Lotos Effect	Len (Norfolk), Paul the Vicar	Fiction Factory / BBC	
2014	Avengers - Lost Episodes - Volume 2	Kollakis	Big Finish	
2014	Counter Measures - Series 3	William Heaton, Mason	Big Finish	
2015	Dr Who - Damaged Goods	Harry Harvey	Big Finish	
2015	Dr Who - Counter Measures - Series 4	William Heaton	Big Finish	
2015	Dr Who - Early Adventures - The Bounty of Ceres	Moreland	Big Finish	
2016	Dr Who - Doom Coalition 3 - Absent Friends	Phillip Cook	Big Finish	Won BBC Audio Drama Award 2017
2016	Survivors - Series 5.2 - New Blood	Silus Broome	Big Finish	
2017	Letters to the Lady Upstairs by Marcel Proust	Narrator	HarperCollins	
2018	Dr Who - Shellshock	General Reinhardt	Big Finish	
2024	Dr Who - All of Space & Time	Mr Darling	Big Finish	

== See also ==
- List of British actors
