= See You At Wembley, Frankie Walsh =

- Directed by: Mark Herman
- Written by: Mark Herman
- Starring: Richard Hope; Jacqueline Bucknell; Ronnie Stevens; Patricia Leslie; Justin Smith; David Shann; Elaine Cook; Nick Fawcett; Roy North
- Cinematography: Andy Collins
- Edited by: David Hill
- Music by: Adrian Rhodes
- Production company: National Film and Television School
- Release date: 1986
- Running time: 28
- Country: United Kingdom
- Language: English

See You At Wembley, Frankie Walsh is a 28-minute long, comedy-drama, short film written and directed by Mark Herman, as his graduation project from the National Film and Television School. It was his directorial debut.

== Plot ==
Malcolm is a sausage factory worker who will soon marry his fiancée Carol. Malcolm and his friends have just witnessed Hull City win an FA Cup quarter final, while Carol was with her mother having her final wedding dress fitting. Malcolm's friends, and Carols father Peter, all of which are Hull City fans, are disappointed after the win, as they realise that the semi-final is on the day of the wedding, so will have to choose whether to miss the first semi-final Hull City have been in since 1930, or the wedding.

Carol goes to get her hair done with her friend Margo, while Malcolm and his friends are watching Hull City get beaten 4-0 by West Brom in a league match. Margo tells Carol that some men love football more than sex, so after Carol had been shopping with Malcolm's parents to buy her mother a present for the wedding, she goes to Malcolm's house, puts on some make-up and lingerie ready for when Malcolm gets home. However Malcolm and his friends drown their sorrows in the pub instead, so she's left in Malcolm's Hull City decorated bedroom all alone.

Malcolm and his best man are talking about the loves in their lives, and Malcolm suggests he will have to become a closet fan like Carol's dad Peter. Meanwhile Peter is in bed with Carol's mum, while reading Journey to Wembley by Brian James. Carol's mum sprays on some perfume, leans over to Peter with a suggestive smile, but rather than reach for her, Peter instead reaches for the pull switch of the light. When Malcolm eventually gets home from the pub, him and Carol talk about the people who have already dropped out of attending the wedding.

Next we skip to the day of the wedding, at the busy household of Carol's parents. While Carol's mother is busy sorting out the boutonnière's, Peter sits down to watch ITV's Saint and Greavsie with a glass of whisky, and a smile on his face. His smile quickly becomes a grimace, when his pompous wife immediately turns the TV off, however he's back smiling again as he sees the loathing reaction on his wife's face, when she opens the present Malcolm's parents have picked for her.

The chief bridesmaid, who is already wearing her bridesmaid dress, but isn't at the household, at the last minute has decided she wants to go to the match instead. She drives to a nearby phonebox where some of her friends are waiting for her to pick them up, gives Carol the bad news while getting changed in the phonebox, then sets off to the match. Malcolm on the other hand gets a nice surprise from his friends, who have got him a Hull City squad poster, signed by all the players wishing him luck on his big day, including his favourite player Frankie Walsh.

Malcolm's friends set off to the match, so it's now just him and Carol's brother Alistair, who still won't get up, after sleeping on the sofa, so Malcolm pulls the duvet off of him. Carol's mother sets off to the church with everyone except Peter and Carol. Carol is upset that it's not the happy day she expected so far, so Peter suggests rearranging it. Peter reminisces of his own wedding day to Carol's mother on the 12 January 1952, the same day that Hull City beat Matt Busby's Man Utd 2-0 in the FA Cup 3rd round, away at Old Trafford. He said that even though it was only the 3rd round, it's a match they still talk about today, so he suggests they hurry up, as they might still be able to make the kick-off.

Carol rings Malcolm to tell him the good news, while Alistair is in the shower. Malcolm then sets off to the church on Alistair's scooter to meet Carol in the wedding car, wearing his top hat top hat rather than the helmet. Alistair gets out of the shower wearing just a towel, wondering where Malcolm has gone, so steps out of the house to look for him. He notices his helmet on the doorstep, and as he bends down to pick it up, the door closes behind him and he's locked out.

While Carol and Malcolm are on the way to the match, Malcolm's friends have had a change of heart so are heading back to the church, and notice Margo stood at the side of the road, as she has also had a change of heart, so they pick her up. In the meantime, Alistair is running around town looking for a phonebox to ring a taxi to the church, Peter has gone home without telling his oblivious wife what is going on, and he attempts to drive to the match.

Peter who had been drinking whisky earlier in the day, is pulled over by the police who breathalyze him, then take him back to the church, and as they arrive they are surprised to see Alistair getting out of a taxi in just a towel, running into the church. Malcolm's friends and Margo drive past Malcolm and Carol without noticing, as Margo's bridesmaid's dress blows up in front of the best man's face at that exact moment.

The vicar decides to cancel the wedding when he sees Peter and Alistair at the back of the church stood with the police, when Carol's mother turns around to see them with a look of shock on her face. Malcolm's friends and Margo arrive at a practically empty church, other than Carol's immediate family and the police. They hear Carol's mother crying, and say "Bastard," thinking that Malcolm has jilted Carol at the altar. Then they leave sheepishly, when Carol's mother stands up with a stern look on her face. Meanwhile the wedding car is breaking down, and the driver informs Carol and Malcolm that they won't even be able to see the end of the match, so they decide to return to the church.

Peter has already told the wedding attendees, including Carol's aunt Angela (who has travelled from the USA) that the wedding will be arranged for Wednesday, as Angela doesn't return to the USA until Thursday. Everyone apart from Malcolm and Carol are now outside the church, listening to the football results on a car radio. The radio presenter announces a score of 1-1 at Villa Park, so there will be a replay back there on Wednesday, to Peter's disappointment. Malcolm and Carol who haven't heard the rearranged football fixture yet, arrive back at the church just as the wedding car was its last legs. Malcolm announces to the crowd, with Carol's snobbish mother standing front and centre, that the wedding will be held on Wednesday. The rest of the crowd are making signals behind Carol's mothers back to say no, but Malcolm doesn't take the hint and says the new wedding date is Wednesday two more times, until he hears the new fixture date on the relatively quiet car radio behind him, and suggests Tuesday instead.

== Cast ==
- Richard Hope - Malcolm
- Jacqueline Bucknell - Carol
- Ronnie Stevens - Carol's Father Peter
- Patricia Leslie - Carol's Mother
- Justin Smith - Carol's Brother Alistair
- David Shann - Kenny
- Elaine Cook - Chief Bridesmaid Margo
- Nick Fawcett - Best Man
- Roy North - Vicar
- Ian Tottem - Best Stand Casual
- Shaun Tordoff - Best Stand Casual

== TV broadcast ==
On the 19 August 1987 it was broadcast on BBC Two as an episode of ScreenPlay Firsts, a series showcasing films by new, young, British film-makers.

== Awards ==
On the 7 June 1987 it won the Foreign Student Film award at the Student Film Awards.
