= Ken Bones =

English actor (born 1947)

- Born: 11 June 1947 (age 79); Dartford, Kent, England
- Occupation: Actor
- Known for: Member of the Royal Shakespeare Company
- Notable work: The Bill

Ken Bones (born 11 June 1947) is an English actor. He is a member of the Royal Shakespeare Company.

== Career ==
=== Theatre ===
Bones trained at RADA between 1971 and 1973, where he won the Honours Diploma, the Ronson Prize, the Kendal Award, the Poel Prize and John Barton Prize. His first professional stage appearance was as Roy in The Odd Couple at Crewe in January 1974. His other appearances in that season included Wick in Little Malcolm, Vincent Crummles in Nicholas Nickleby and Dr Hennessey in Count Dracula.

During 1974 and 1975, Bones was a member of the Prospect Theatre Company, taking part in the company's national tour in such venues as the Edinburgh Festival and London's Roundhouse, playing Gower in Henry IV and Henry V with Timothy Dalton, and the Narrator in the rock musical Pilgrim with Paul Jones and Peter Straker.

Bones joined the Marlowe Theatre in Canterbury in 1976, and with whom he played Ernst Ludwig in Cabaret, Mr Shanks in Habeas Corpus, Trofimov in The Cherry Orchard, Milo Tindal in Sleuth and Curly Delafield in Knuckle. In 1977, he toured with the Mermaid Theatre educational company "The Molecule Club" teaching science to children. In 1978, Bones played Lucifer in the first modern revival of The Lincoln Mystery Cycle in Lincoln Cathedral.

During 1978, he joined Southern Exchange Theatre Company, which was established by Charles Savage to provide regional theatre for civic theatres without resident repertory companies playing at the Wyvern Theatre in Swindon, the Hexagon in Reading and the Lighthouse in Poole. With this company he played Ramble in Lock Up Your Daughters, Leonard in Time and Time Again, Saul Hodgkin in The Ghost Train, Alec Kooning in Dear Janet Rosenberg.., The Man in Chekov's The Lady with the Little Dog and Bob Cratchit in A Christmas Carol.

In 1979, Bones played the Earl of Warwick in Saint Joan, Eilert Loevborg in Hedda Gabler with Gayle Hunnicutt, and John in Absent Friends. In 1980, he appeared in a national tour of Woyzeck with Foco Novo Theatre Company playing the Drum Major.

His other stage appearances include the Duke in The Revenger's Tragedy and Dr Klein in Her Naked Skin for the National Theatre, and, for the Royal Shakespeare Company he has appeared in 21 plays, including Antony and Cleopatra, The Tempest, Othello, The Duchess of Malfi, Macbeth, The Winter's Tale, Cyrano de Bergerac, Les Liaisons Dangereuses, Tamburlaine, Much Ado About Nothing and King Lear.

In London's West End, Bones has appeared in You Never Can Tell, Communicating Doors, Becket, The Resistible Rise of Arturo Ui and Antony and Cleopatra; and for other theatres Design for Living, Relative Values, As You Like It, A Midsummer Night's Dream Doctor Faustus with Ben Kingsley, and Sir Thomas More.

Most recently, he played Reverend Brown in Inherit the Wind with Kevin Spacey at the Old Vic.

=== Film and television ===
Bones' first television appearance was in the BBC Jubilee Play "A Day in the Life" by Ray Connolly, in 1977. In 1980, he appeared in an episode of Fox as Kemble. Bones played Sergeant Parkes in an episode of Spearhead (1981), played a small role in Series 3 of the long running TV series, The Bill (1987), Paul Roussillon in Bergerac (1988), and a Superintendent in London's Burning (1988). Also in 1988, Bones played Victorian medium Robert James Lees in ITV's Jack the Ripper starring Michael Caine, which was a huge ratings success around the world. His first feature film was Bellman and True (1987) directed by Richard Loncraine and starring Bernard Hill. The New York Times film critic said "Mr Bones makes a memorable screen debut as the bullying Gort". In 1995, Bones played Toussant in the film Cutthroat Island, and in 1998 made appearances in Dangerfield and Cold Feet. He played Admiral Bill Wilson in the 1999 film Wing Commander, and in 2001 he played Banquo in a made-for-television film of the Royal Shakespeare Company's Macbeth which starred Antony Sher as Macbeth. The film was the televised version of a stage show which had an enormously successful run in Britain, Japan and the United States.

In 2002, Bones played Keith Burns in an episode of Spooks and in 2003 appeared in Casualty as Robbie. His 2004 roles include Hippasus in the film Troy starring Brad Pitt, Mr Mansell in Heartbeat and Assistant Commissioner Bob Mullen in New Tricks.

During recent years, Bones has appeared in Doctors (2007), Holby City (2008 and 2010) and The Bill (1987–2009) as DCI Ted Ackroyd, as well as in the film Perfect Hideout (2008) starring Billy Zane. In 2009, he played Erasmus in Henry VIII: The Mind of a Tyrant, and in 2011 he appeared in the six-part series The Hour. He has also played a character named Sethius in popular CBBC television series Young Dracula.

Bones portrays Lord Halifax, British Foreign Secretary from 1938 to 1940, in 2012's Season 2 of Upstairs Downstairs, the 2010 British television series.

He appeared in the Doctor Who 50th anniversary special, The Day of the Doctor, as The General in 2013, and reprised the role in the Series 9 finale Hell Bent (2015) before passing it to T'Nia Miller. Bones played Publican No. 13 in The World's End (2013), and the same year it was announced that he had joined the cast of Atlantis. His most recent film appearance was as an Egyptian scribe in the 2014 epic Exodus: Gods and Kings. In 2016, he appeared in the TV series Medici: Masters of Florence.

In 2017, Bones appeared in the BBC TV series Father Brown episode 5.3 "The Eve of St John" as a warlock, Eugene Bone. He played Cardinal Leto, the Papal envoy in Versailles (2018).

== Filmography ==
=== Film ===
Year	Title	Role	Notes
1985	Cyrano de Bergerac	Carbon de Castel Jaloux	TV film
1987	Bellman and True	Gort	
1992	Split Second	Forensic Expert	
1995	Cutthroat Island	Toussant	
1997	Police 2020	Commander Johnson	
1998	A Life for a Life	Ronald Outteridge	TV film
1999	Wing Commander	Admiral Bill Wilson	
1999	The Winter's Tale	Polixenes	TV film
2000	Blue Murder	Henstock	TV film
2001	Macbeth	Banquo	TV film
2004	Troy	Hippasus	
2004	Spooks Interactive	Colonel Tim Briggot	TV film
2005	Brothers of the Head	Henry Couling	
2005	Wallis & Edward	Maitland	TV film
2006	Lasko: Death Train	Saratoga	TV film
2006	Final Contract: Death on Delivery	Hillman	
2007	Too Much Too Young	Sir Reginald Morris	
2008	Perfect Hideout	Roth	
2010	Harry Potter and the Forbidden Journey	Salazar Slytherin	Short
2013	The World's End	Publican 13	
2014	Walking with the Enemy	Samuel Stern	
2014	Exodus: Gods and Kings	Ramses' Scribe	
2018	Vlad	Vlad	Short
2019	Baghdad in My Shadow	Graham Foster	

=== Television ===
Year	Title	Role	Notes
1977	Jubilee	Paul Crawford	Episode: "An Hour in the Life..."
1980	Fox	Kemble	Episode: "Fox: Big 'F' – Family"
1981	Spearhead	Sergeant Parkes	Episode: "Loyalties"
1986	Screen Two	Detective Inspector Mercer	Episode: "Frankie and Johnnie"
1987	The Bill	Phil Teesdale	Episode: "What Are Little Boys Made Of?"
1988	Bergerac	Paul Roussillon	Episode: "Crossed Swords"
1988	London's Burning	Superintendent	1 episode
1988	Jack the Ripper	Robert James Lees	Mini-series
1993	Seekers	Tony Laytham	1 episode
1993	Screen One	John Kavanagh	Episode: "Wall of Silence"
1993	The Bill	Detective Superintendent Corby	Episode: "Hard Evidence"
1994	A Skirt Through History	Arthur Munby	Episode: "An Experiment"
1994	Moving Story	Commissionaire	Episode: "A Piece of Cake"
1994	Paris	Helmut	Episode: "L'infamie"
1996	The Bill	Leon Chase	Episode: "The Right Thing"
1997	Crime Traveller	Kirby	Episode: "Death Minister"
1997	Bramwell	Mr. Herne	1 episode
1997	An Unsuitable Job for a Woman	Ted Fulton	Episode: "Sacrifice"
1998	Cold Feet	Detective	1 episode
1998	Dangerfield	D.C.I. Miller	Episode: "Double Helix"
1999	The Bill	Paul Hilman	Episode: "Borderline"
2001	The Bill	Roy Stenning	Episode: "Liquid City"
2002	In Deep	DCI Geary	Episode: "Untouched"
2002	Spooks	Keith Burns	Episode: "Thou Shalt Not Kill"
2003	The Inspector Lynley Mysteries	Rodney Aronson	Episode: "In the Presence of the Enemy"
2003	Casualty	Robbie	Episode: "Fool for Love"
2003	Murphy's Law	Tyler	Episode: "Reunion"
2003	Heartbeat	Mr. Mansell	Episode: "Out of the Blue"
2004	Heartbeat	Trevor Godwin	Episode: "In the Bleak Midwinter"
2004	Hustle	DCI Mullens	Episode: "The Con Is On"
2004	New Tricks	Assistant Commissioner Bob Mullan	Episode: "Talking to the Dead"
2005	Timewatch	Otto Strasser	Episode: "Inside the Mind of Adolf Hitler"
2005	The Virgin Queen	Bishop Latimer	Mini-series
2007	Doctors	Tyrrel	Recurring role
2008	Holby City	Lawrence Parker	Episode: "Love Will Tear Us Apart"
2009	The Bill	DCI Ted Ackroyd	Episode: "Feet of Clay"
2009	Law & Order: UK	Ediz Kilic	Episode: "Paradise"
2009	Henry VIII: The Mind of a Tyrant	Erasmus	Mini-series
2010	Identity	Halit Kemal	Mini-series
2010	Midsomer Murders	Giles Braithwaite	Episode: "The Noble Art"
2010	Any Human Heart	Mr. Mountstuart	Mini-series
2010	The Nativity	Bethlehem Rabbi	Mini-series
2010	Holby City	William Chase	Recurring role
2011	The Hour	Wallace Sherwin	Recurring role
2011	Young Dracula	Sethius	Episode: "All for One"
2012	Upstairs Downstairs	Lord Halifax	Recurring role
2013	The Bible	Ira	Episode: "Exodus"
2013	Foyle's War	Max Hoffman	Episode: "The Eternity Ring"
2013	Da Vinci's Demons	The Jew	3 episodes
2013	Starlings	Mr. Cooke	1 episode
2013	Casualty	Alan Pitney	Episode: "Rock and a Hard Place"
2013	The Great Train Robbery	Commander George Hatherill	Episode: "A Copper's Tale"
2013–2015	Atlantis	Melas	Series regular
2013–2015	Doctor Who	The General	2 episodes
2014	Scott & Bailey	John Rivington	1 episode
2015	A.D. The Bible Continues	Annas	Series regular
2015	Tyrant	Qadi	Episode: "The Other Brother"
2016	Medici	Ugo Bencini	Series regular
2016	Jonathan Creek	Nathan Clore	Episode: "Deamons' Roost"
2017	Father Brown	Eugene Bone	Episode: "The Eve of St John"
2018	Versailles	Cardinal Leto	Recurring role
2018	A Discovery of Witches	Sigismund	Recurring role
2019	Queens of Mystery	Quentin Foster	Episode: "Smoke and Mirrors"
2020	Des	Judge Croom-Johnson	Mini-series
2026	Run Away	Casper Vartage	Mini-series
