= Kerry Ann Christiansen =

British actress

- Education: University of Sunderland
- Occupation: Actress
- Known for: Byker Grove, Purely Belter

Kerry Ann Christiansen is a British actress who began her career playing Flora in the popular British children’s TV series Byker Grove.

After her character's departure from the show, she went on to play Kim Cotton in the short lived ITV series Close and True, which also starred Robson Green and Jamie Bell, and she made a powerful cameo playing Bridget in the 2000 film Purely Belter.

Kerry Ann went on to study Media Production at the University of Sunderland before returning to being in front of the camera to star in the 2005 short film Trainlines.

Kerry Ann then went onto complete her nursing degree and now works as a mental health nurse in Newcastle.

== Films ==
- Trainlines (2005)
- Purely Belter (2000)

== TV series ==
- Close and True (2000)
- Byker Grove (1993–1997)
