= Robert James Lees =

British spiritualist (1849-1931)

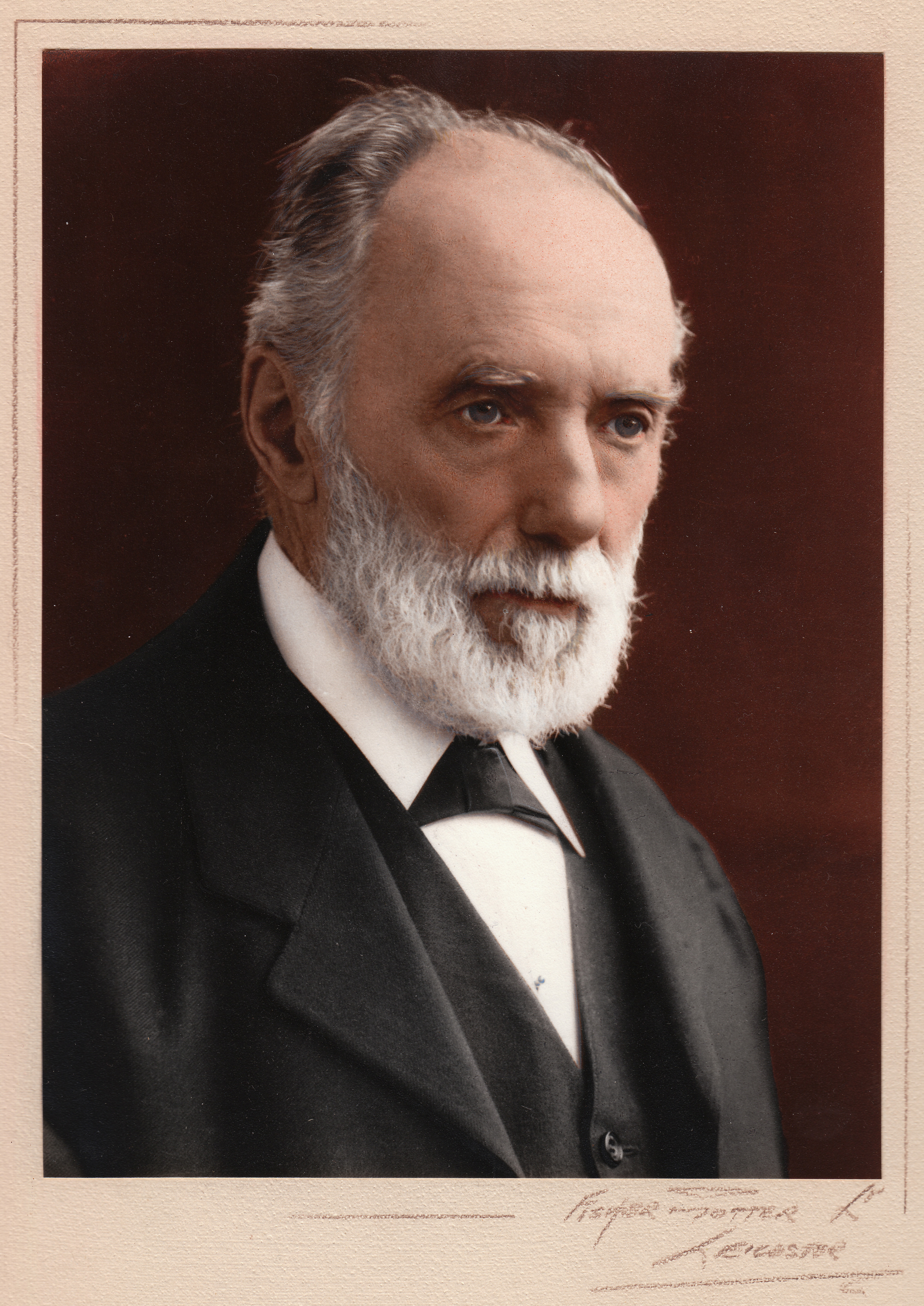
- Born: 12 August 1849; Hinckley, Leicestershire, England, United Kingdom
- Died: 11 January 1931 (aged 81); Leicester, Leicestershire, England, United Kingdom
- Occupations: Spiritualist, occultist
- Known for: Claiming to identify the unknown Whitechapel murders serial killer Jack the Ripper

Robert James Lees (12 August 1849 – 11 January 1931) was a British spiritualist, medium, preacher, writer and healer of the late Victorian era and early twentieth century known today for claims that he knew the identity of Jack the Ripper, responsible for the Whitechapel murders of 1888.

== Early life ==
Born in Hinckley, Leicestershire, the son of William Lingham Lees (1818–1880) and Elizabeth (née Patch) (1819–1883), Robert Lees spent his early years in Birmingham. It is claimed that, following the death of Prince Albert in 1861 the 13-year-old Lees went into a trance and communicated messages from Albert to Queen Victoria. It is further claimed that Lees lived for a period in Buckingham Palace so that Victoria could regularly talk to her beloved Albert through him. None of these claims have been substantiated. The only Royal connection that has been uncovered between Lees and the Royal Family is a letter dated 23 January 1899 sent to Lees from the Privy Office thanking him for sending the Queen a copy of his book Through The Mists.

In December 1871 Lees married Sarah Ann Bishop (1850–1912), whom he had first met as a boy while attending a Sunday School class in the Aston district of Birmingham. They had sixteen children, ten of whom survived to adulthood. In 1876 he moved to Manchester where he worked as a journalist for the Manchester Guardian. In 1878 Lees and his family moved to London, where he worked as a journalist in Fleet Street and where he befriended W.T. Stead. He worked on several London-based publications including George Newnes' Tit-Bits magazine.

== Spiritualist ==
Lees claimed to have had his first psychic experience aged three. He later wrote:

"I am personally aware that as a child I cried at being left in the darkness unless I saw a mysterious and to others invisible kilted Highlander who remained beside me talking or singing till I fell asleep. And even now, after a lapse of half a century the vivid memory of his strong but kindly face is as freshly recalled as if he had sat beside me whilst this New Year was born."

Despite having had little formal education, Lees wrote a series of spiritualist books which continued to sell many years after his death. He claimed that these books had been dictated to him by friends from the spirit realm, and referred to himself as the Recorder. The best known is the three-volume series 'The Mists Trilogy' (Through the Mists, The Life Elysian, The Gate of Heaven), written between 1898 – 1931. The Heretic was written as his only autobiographical novel which was a record of his many years in London. An Astral Bridegroom was a study into reincarnation.

Sceptics consider his psychic claims to be the result of self-delusion.

== Jack the Ripper ==
At the time of the Jack the Ripper murders in 1888, Lees was living in the London area. His diary entries for 1888 reveal that on 2 October, during a month when no Ripper murders took place, Lees went to both the City of London Police and Scotland Yard offering his assistance in catching Jack the Ripper. However, he was turned away as a madman on both occasions, though Scotland Yard offered to write to him.

One story, frequently quoted in books and films on the subject, is that Lees, using his psychic power, led the police to Jack the Ripper. This story first appeared in print on 28 April 1895, in The Chicago Herald. Another version of the same story was also published in The People on 19 May 1895.

The Chicago Herald article claimed that, over a number of years, Lees had been troubled by psychic visions of Jack the Ripper killing his victims. Each of these visions came true. Lees became disturbed by the visions and sought medical advice, going abroad as a result, where he no longer had the visions. Back in London, he and his wife Sarah were travelling on an omnibus when a man got on at Notting Hill. Lees turned and told his wife that the man was Jack the Ripper. Even though his wife laughed at him, when the man got off the bus at Marble Arch, Lees followed him. Finding a police constable on the way, Lees told him of his suspicions, but the constable also laughed at him. After more murders, Lees was able to convince the police of the truth of his visions and led them to a fashionable house in London, which was home to a noted physician who had treated members of the Royal Family. On being found in incriminating circumstances, the doctor was put in a lunatic asylum under the name of Thomas Mason 124, and a mock funeral held. According to the Chicago Herald, the tale had been related by a Dr. Howard of London, who, when drunk, had told the story to a man who then told the newspaper.

Ripperologists disregard the story as a hoax. Obvious errors in the Chicago Herald story include the claim there had been 17 murders that took place over a number of years, but the actual number of Ripper victims was just five, with the actual murders occurring in just a few months in the Autumn of 1888. Melvin Harris in his book Jack the Ripper, The Bloody Truth provides convincing evidence that the story was a hoax. He believes that the hoaxers were the Whitechapel Club, Chicago. The offices of the club at that time were behind those of the Chicago Herald. According to Harris, the police had "denied that Lees was involved with the Ripper hunt. In fact, Robert Lees's own diary entries contradict this part of the tale. They show that he didn't approach the police until October 2, 1888 three days after the murders on the twenty-ninth."

In 1976, the Lees/Ripper story came into prominence again with the publication of Stephen Knight's book Jack the Ripper: The Final Solution. Ian Sharp had rediscovered the Chicago Herald article while researching Jack the Ripper for a BBC documentary that had been screened before the publication of Knight's book. The publication of The Final Solution saw the first time that the Chicago Herald article had officially been quoted in a major publication since The People had quoted it in 1895.

== Later years ==
In 1902 Lees moved to Ilfracombe in Devon with his family from Plymouth and remained there until about 1928, when he returned to Leicester. Lees died at his home, 'Hazelhurst', Fosse Road South, Leicester, in 1931 at the age of 81 years. His body was cremated at Gilroes Cemetery and his ashes were interred in the grave of his wife in Score Woods Cemetery at Ilfracombe.

A blue plaque to commemorate Lees was commissioned by the Hinckley Civic Society and was unveiled by a descendant of Lees on Saturday 2 May 2009.

== In fiction ==
Robert James Lees has been depicted in several works of fiction related to the Jack the Ripper case.

In the 1979 film Murder by Decree starring Christopher Plummer as Sherlock Holmes, Lees was played by Donald Sutherland.

In the 1988 ITV mini-series Jack the Ripper starring Michael Caine, Lees was played by actor Ken Bones.

He is a character in the comic book From Hell, written by Alan Moore, although he is omitted from its film adaptation. In the story, Lees is portrayed as a charlatan, though he is ultimately – and unwittingly – instrumental in helping Chief Inspector Abberline in identifying the Ripper. Interestingly, though this version of Lees admits privately that his visions were false, he also expresses wonderment that they all turned out to be true.

== Publications ==
Books written by Robert James Lees include:

- Lees, Robert J., The Car of Phoebus: An Astral Bridegroom N.p., 1909.
- Lees, Robert J., The Gate of Heaven N.p., n.d.
- Lees, Robert J., The Heretic N.p., 1901.
- Lees, Robert J., The Life Elysian N.p., 1905.
- Lees, Robert J., My Books: How They Were Written Occult Review (December 1931).
- Lees, Robert J., Through the Mists London: W. Rider & Sons Ltd., 1910.
