= Queen Anne (play) =

Play written by Helen Edmundson

Queen Anne is a 2015 play by the British playwright Helen Edmundson on the life of Anne, Queen of Great Britain. It is set between just before her accession in 1702 and her husband George's death in 1708 and centres on the relationship between Anne and her close friend Sarah, Duchess of Marlborough, by whom Anne was heavily influenced in the period before and during her reign.

It was premiered at the Swan Theatre, Stratford-upon-Avon by the Royal Shakespeare Company from November 2015 until January 2016, directed by Natalie Abrahami. It made its London premiere from 30 June to 30 September 2017 at the Theatre Royal Haymarket with Emma Cunniffe reprising her role as Anne and Romola Garai as Sarah.

== Plot ==
In 1702 London, a gentleman's club puts on a raucous satire mocking Princess Anne and her recent phantom pregnancy. Afterwards, Abigail Hill meets Jonathan Swift and her cousin Robert Harley, a Tory and the Leader of the House of Commons. Harley agrees to win her a position in Anne's household by introducing her to Anne's confidant Sarah Churchill, in return for her supplying him with information. Meanwhile, Sarah describes to her husband John Churchill, (Duke of Marlborough) her visit to Sophia of Hanover, presumed to be second in line to the throne due to Anne's continued childlessness. William III tries to force his sister-in-law Anne into accepting a visit to London by Sophia, despite Anne's misgivings about what message this will send out regarding her own position in the succession, but it takes Sarah to win Anne round to the idea.

Soon afterwards William dies in a riding accident and Anne comes to the throne. Initially advised by Sidney Godolphin, Sarah and the Whigs, she is later won round to replacing him with Harley and following a more Tory line, such as supporting the anti-Whig Occasional Conformity Act 1711 and the Act of Union of 1707. In revenge for Godolphin's dismissal and Anne's perceived lack of sympathy for Sarah's son's death, Sarah has Arthur Maynwaring write a damning and sexually explicit satire of Abigail's influence over Anne alleging that they have a lesbian relationship - Abigail has in fact gained and kept Anne's trust by never talking politics. Sarah shows this to Anne but later Abigail privately reveals that she knows Maynwaring and Sarah are behind it. Harley arranges for Swift to produce a satire aimed against Sarah and her husband, alleging their embezzlement of army funds to build Blenheim Palace.

Sarah is then forced to resign her position of Keeper of the Privy Purse but relations sour between her and her husband when he does not resign in support of her. Sarah plans to publish her correspondence with Anne to avenge her dismissal, but this is thwarted and John decides to flee England rather than stay and face a trial. Sarah attempts one final meeting with Anne, but their relationship remains broken as Sarah makes one final defiant monologue to the audience.

== Cast (Stratford premiere) ==
- Daisy Ashford - Lady Clarendon
- Jonathan Broadbent - Robert Harley
- Robert Cavanah - John Churchill
- Jonathan Christie - Arthur Maynwaring
- Emma Cunniffe - Queen Anne
- Daniel Easton - Colonel Masham
- Michael Fenton Stevens - Dr John Radcliffe
- Richard Hope - Sidney Godolphin
- Natascha McElhone - Sarah Churchill
- Hywel Morgan - Prince George of Denmark
- Beth Park - Abigail Hill
- Carl Prekopp - Defoe/William III
- Jenny Rainsford - Jezebel/Lady-in-Waiting
- Elliott Ross - Jack Churchill
- Anna Tierney - Lady Somerset
- Tom Turner - Jonathan Swift
- Ragevan Vasan - Groom
