= Hope Springs (2003 film) =

2003 film by Mark Herman

- Theatrical release poster
- Directed by: Mark Herman
- Screenplay by: Mark Herman
- Based on: New Cardiff by Charles Webb
- Produced by: Uri Fruchtmann; Barnaby Thompson
- Starring: Colin Firth; Heather Graham; Minnie Driver
- Cinematography: Ashley Rowe
- Edited by: Michael Ellis
- Music by: John Altman
- Production companies: Touchstone Pictures; Fragile Films; Mumbo Jumbo Productions; Prominent Features; Scala Films
- Distributed by: Buena Vista Pictures Distribution
- Release dates: 14 March 2003 (Bradford Film Festival); 9 May 2003 (United Kingdom)
- Running time: 92 minutes
- Countries: United Kingdom; United States
- Language: English

Hope Springs is a 2003 romantic comedy film written and directed by Mark Herman, based on the novel New Cardiff by Charles Webb. The film stars Colin Firth as Colin, an English painter who travels to the town of Hope, Vermont, in the United States after a traumatic experience. There, he meets Mandy (Heather Graham), a nursing home worker who helps him get over his break-up with Vera (Minnie Driver).

== Plot ==
English artist Colin is dumped by his childhood love and fiancée Vera, so he travels to a place with the most positive name he can find. He arrives in Hope, a quiet town in Vermont in autumn, and showing clear signs of emotional distress, checks into an inn.

Colin tries to forget his troubles by sketching the eccentric town residents. When he asks for "rubbers" instead of erasers at a store, it causes the small-town locals to go on alert. The casual request embodies cultural differences with Americans and Brits and causes some misunderstandings between them.

When Joanie, the quirky and outlandish hotel manager, sees his state she calls over her friend Mandy, a nursing home attendant, to talk with him and take his mind off his troubles. Everyone in town all know each other and have boring predictable lives, but by bringing Colin and Mandy together, Joanie and the other Hope residents add some romance and drama to their own lives.

Seemingly opposites, Colin is a reserved English artist and Mandy is a free spirited Vermonter obsessed with butterflies. Eventually they fall in love, with Colin healing and building a new life while finally getting over his break-up.

Suddenly though, the overbearing Vera shows up to get Colin back. Extremely self-confident and oblivious to anyone else's ideas or feelings, she denies that Colin is no longer interested and relentlessly pursues him, while finding out about him and Mandy.

Vera exploits Mandy's insecurities about her new relationship with Colin, while manipulating his memories of their connection. The former couple's twenty years together adds to Vera's leverage, but Colin tells her that, "In one minute...short span of time...you not only became unimportant as an aim in life, but also the very thing I need to flee from in order to find happiness."

Later Colin goes to Vera's hotel room, demanding she leave them alone and return to England. However, she strips down to sexy underwear and her smoking sets off the fire alarm. Mandy sees them together in front of the inn during the fire evacuation and assumes Colin took her back. He tries to clear up the misunderstanding but she only wants him to promise to never contact her again. Colin agrees on the condition that she get a passport.

Colin trades a flattering, oil portrait of Hope's mayor in exchange for a favor. Supposedly he discovered Vera's genealogy is linked to the town. Colin reveals that it was faked to distract her, so she'd fixate on becoming the Queen of Hope at the town festival. Vera is finally convinced that their romance is over and tries to enjoy the consolation prize.

After Colin leaves Hope, Joanie tells Mandy that his cousin was supposed to meet him, but Colin forgot to cancel so she should pick him up at Hope Springs. When Mandy gets there, Colin proposes with a vintage butterfly engagement ring engraved with their names.

Colin carries Mandy back to the inn across town, waving to everyone as they pass. Although she warns him of hurting his back, he insists, inevitably seizing up. Happily reunited, Colin finds happiness when he least expected it.

== Cast ==
- Colin Firth as Colin Ware
- Heather Graham as Mandy
- Minnie Driver as Vera Edwards
- Oliver Platt as Doug Reed (Hope's mayor)
- Frank Collison as Mr. Fisher
- Mary Steenburgen as Joanie Fisher

== Reception ==
At the box office in the United Kingdom, the film grossed just over £1 million. The BBC review noted that it is a "date movie that's well worth making a date with".
