= Mark Herman =

English film director and screenwriter

- Born: Mark Herman; 1954 (age 71–72); Bridlington, East Riding of Yorkshire, England
- Other names: Mark Black; Black; Amber and Black; Amber & Black; M. Henry Herman; M Henry Herman
- Occupations: Film producer, film director, screenwriter
- Years active: 1987–2009

Mark Herman (born 1954) is a British film director and screenwriter, best known for writing and directing the 1996 film Brassed Off and the 2008 film The Boy in the Striped Pyjamas. Film critic Paul Wells offers this assessment of Herman's work in the 2019 book Directors in British and Irish Cinema: "Herman has attracted little critical attention but his preoccupation with the underdog and personal and social injustice makes him a pertinent commentator on the decline of the English working class and its strategies for survival."

== Early life ==
Herman was born in Bridlington, East Riding of Yorkshire, England. His father worked as a bacon importer. He was educated at Woodleigh School, North Yorkshire and thereafter at Sedbergh School and Bridlington Grammar School, Bridlington. He worked for his father's bacon importing business until his mid-20s.

He was late entering the film industry, first studying art at the Regional College of Art and Design in Kingston upon Hull aged 25, then going on to study graphic design at Leeds Polytechnic for 3 years. At the end of the first year he had to choose between illustration, printmaking, graphics or film for the final 2 years. He applied to the illustration, printmaking, and graphics parts of the course, however he wasn't accepted into any of them, so had no choice but to pick film. It was there in the film part of his graphic design degree, that he started doing animation.

He then progressed to the National Film and Television School. At NFTS he recognised the superior talents of people like his neighbouring classmate Nick Park, and other classmates like Tony Collingwood, so decided to move away from animation and towards live-action instead. Nick Park was making A Grand Day Out at the time.

== Film career ==
Herman made his live-action directorial debut with his NFTS graduation film, See You At Wembley, Frankie Walsh (1986), which he also wrote. It won the Foreign Student Film award at the Student Film Awards. He spent the next few years writing for the BBC, and for the ITV series The 10%ers. In 1989, he made a short film, Unusual Ground Floor Conversion, which played in cinemas before Mel Smith's The Tall Guy.

Herman's first feature-length project was Blame It on the Bellboy (1992), made for the Hollywood Pictures unit of Disney, a comedy of mistaken identity starring Dudley Moore, Bryan Brown, Patsy Kensit, Richard Griffiths, and Bronson Pinchot. It failed at the box office, and with most critics. However, Janet Maslin in The New York Times called it "effervescent fun. Mark Herman, a film school graduate who both wrote and directed this comedy, has concocted a witty mistaken-identity plot and done an able job of keeping it in motion".

Next, Herman wrote and directed the critically acclaimed Brassed Off (1996), following the members of a colliery brass band, still struggling to survive a decade after the miners' strike. The film won the Peter Sellers Award for Comedy at the Evening Standard British Film Awards in 1997, as well as the Best Screenplay award from the Writers Guild of Great Britain; it also won the César for Best Foreign Film in 1998. It has become a classic, ranked at #85 in the British Film Institute's 1999 list of 100 best British films of the 20th century. A stage adaptation by Paul Allen was first performed in Sheffield in 1998, and has been revived frequently since then.

In Little Voice (1998), adapted by Herman from Jim Cartwright's play The Rise and Fall of Little Voice, Jane Horrocks reprises the title role of a harried young woman whose only escape lies in the memory of her father and in imitating the singers he admired. The film also starred Michael Caine, Brenda Blethyn (who was nominated for an Academy Award for Best Supporting Actress), Jim Broadbent, and Ewan McGregor. Derek Elley in Variety called Little Voice "a small picture with a big heart" and cited Herman's "smooth direction".

Purely Belter (2000), adapted by Herman from Jonathan Tulloch's novel The Season Ticket, is the story of two teenage boys trying to get together enough money for a couple of Newcastle United F.C. season tickets. Herman cast two unknown boys in the lead roles, and their performances were praised by critics, while the film was largely ignored. As Michael Thomson wrote in his BBC review, "Indeed Chris Beattie and Greg McLane, both newcomers, are wonderfully unforced and amusing as the two lads, but they would have benefited from characters which were fuller in a film that was richer".

Herman's 2003 film Hope Springs was his first film since his debut to be made for a major Hollywood studio (Touchstone Pictures). Herman adapted the screenplay from the novel New Cardiff by Charles Webb, author of The Graduate. The film starred Colin Firth, Heather Graham, and Minnie Driver, in a story about a British artist who relocates to small-town Vermont to get over a failed relationship. Reviews were mixed, with Mark Adams in The Hollywood Reporter writing that "somehow it can't make the leap from an enjoyable light film to a movie to remember", while Neil Smith on the BBC called it "a date movie that's well worth making a date with".

His most recent work is the Holocaust drama The Boy in the Striped Pyjamas, which Herman adapted from the 2006 novel of the same name by John Boyne. It was produced by David Heyman, and starred Asa Butterfield, David Thewlis, Vera Farmiga, Sheila Hancock, and Rupert Friend. The film divided critics strongly, with Ty Burr in The Boston Globe writing, "Because its gaze is so level and so unyielding, it stands as one of the better dramatic films made on this subject", while John Anderson in The Washington Post called it "yet another attempt to revisit a sorrowful event in history that should never be forgotten or used for entertainment". Herman reflected in 2024 that "the challenge there was to tell a story that might pull kids in to want to learn more about the Holocaust. But by making the story accessible to kids, about kids, it had to be unrealistic, a fable even, and therefore upset quite a lot of people. But I didn’t mind how many people it upset, if it encouraged one single kid to learn more, it was worth it".

Herman is a fellow of Film and Television Production at York St John University, York, England, and has received Honorary Doctorates from the University of Hull and Leeds Beckett University.

== Songwriting, Amber & Black, and Hull City AFC ==
Herman was a schoolfriend of musician Henry Priestman, who like Herman is a Hull City A.F.C. fan.

In February 1983 Priestman as "Harry Amber" and Herman as "Mark Black," together as "Amber and Black," along with the Hull City players themselves, released the song "The Tigers are Back." It was made to raise funds to help pay the players wages, as the effects of Hull City's previous seasons money struggles were still visible. Herman reworded the song "Out of Luck" by Priestman's previous band Yachts, to get the lyrics. The record sleeves and records themselves contained the made up record label logo "Don Records" in tribute to Hull City's then chairman Don Robinson, and the made up issue number "COL001" in tribute to their then manager Colin Appleton.

In June 1983, Herman filmed Hull City's end-of-season tour of Florida, where the players and staff visited Walt Disney World, and played the Tampa Bay Rowdies who were managed by Rodney Marsh, in the return leg of the Arrow Air Anglo-American Cup. It was directed and edited by Herman, with Priestman composing the music. Herman released the documentary online in 2016 with the title A Kick in the Grass.

Herman co-wrote lyrics for the songs "Ideal World," "Hooverville," and "Sad Songs" for Henry Priestman's band The Christians on their first album, The Christians (1987), alongside Priestman himself. Priestman had done a football themed song for Herman's film See You at Wembley, Frankie Walsh, and Herman had done the lyrics for it, however the lyrics didn't fit the song, so they were scrapped. However they tweaked the lyrics, which were eventually used for "Ideal World" instead.

On 1 January 2008, midway through Hull City's Premier League promotion season, "Amber & Black" released the song "The City's on Fire" on Myspace. It was their first Hull City song since 1983. It was later re-released just before 2014 FA Cup final between Hull City and Arsenal F.C.

== Filmography ==
- See You At Wembley, Frankie Walsh (1986)
- Unusual Ground Floor Conversion (1989)
- Blame It on the Bellboy (1992)
- Brassed Off (1996)
- Little Voice (1998)
- Purely Belter (2000)
- Hope Springs (2003)
- The Boy in the Striped Pyjamas (2008)
- A Kick in the Grass (2016)

== Awards and nominations ==
- Student Film Awards 1987 – Foreign Student Film winner for See You At Wembley, Frankie Walsh.
- Evening Standard British Film Awards 1997 – Peter Sellers Award for Comedy for Brassed Off.
- Writers Guild of Great Britain 1997 – Best Screenplay for Brassed Off.
- César Awards 1998 – Best Foreign Film for Brassed Off.
- Empire Awards 2000 – Best British Director nominee for Little Voice.
