= Jacob Levy (murder suspect) =

British murder suspect (1865–1889)

- Born: 1856; Aldgate, London, England
- Died: 29 July 1891 (aged 34–35)
- Known for: Suspect of Jack the Ripper

Jacob Levy (1856 – 29 July 1891) was born in Aldgate in 1856. He was one of those suspected of being Jack the Ripper.

He followed in his father's trade as a butcher, and by 1888 he was living in Middlesex Street with his wife and children, which was close to where Catherine Eddowes was murdered. Levy was a butcher with the necessary skills to remove certain organs from the victims, and was recorded as suffering from general paralysis of the insane. His 1890 asylum records report that he "feels that if he is not restrained he will do some violence to some one".

Jennifer Wallis, a historian of medicine and psychiatry, stated that it is unlikely a person with Levy's condition would have been able to carry out serial murders and persistently conceal having done so.
