= Purely Belter =

2000 film by Mark Herman

- British DVD cover
- Directed by: Mark Herman
- Written by: Mark Herman, Jonathan Tulloch
- Produced by: Elizabeth Karlsen
- Starring: Chris Beattie, Greg McLane, Tim Healy, Charlie Hardwick, Kerry Ann Christiansen, Jody Baldwin
- Cinematography: Andy Collins
- Edited by: Michael Ellis
- Music by: Ian Broudie, Michael Gibbs
- Production companies: FilmFour Productions; Mumbo-Jumbo Productions
- Distributed by: FilmFour Distributors
- Release date: 3 November 2000
- Running time: 99 minutes
- Country: United Kingdom
- Language: English

Purely Belter is a 2000 British comedy drama film directed by Mark Herman about two teenagers (Chris Beattie and Greg McLane) trying to get money, by any means necessary, in order to get season tickets for home games of Premier League football team Newcastle United. It is based on the 2000 novel The Season Ticket by Jonathan Tulloch.

== Title ==
The title is a Geordie dialect expression. "Pure" means very, and "Belter" or "Belta" means great or good. Despite it being based in Newcastle Upon-Tyne and following Newcastle United F.C, the actual dialect phrase "Pure Belter" has been altered to "Purely Belter" to make it grammatically more conventional for a mainstream audience. The phrase is spoken several times in the film.

== Cast ==
- Chris Beattie as Gerry McCarten
- Greg McLane as Sewell
- Charlie Hardwick as Mrs McCarten
- Roy Hudd as Mr Sewell
- Tim Healy as Billy McCarten
- Kevin Whately as Mr Caird
- Tracy Whitwell as Clare McCarten
- Kerry Ann Christiansen as Bridget
- Chris Wiper as Jimmy
- Jody Baldwin as Gemma
- Charlie Richmond as Mally
- Denise Welsh as the teacher

== Plot ==
The events take place over a year, the film being divided into four sections named after the four seasons.

Sewell (Greg McLane) and Gerry (Chris Beattie), football-mad teenagers from broken families in Gateshead, break into Newcastle United's St James' Park stadium and steal the "sacred" turf from the penalty spot. After this success, they dream of earning money to get season tickets, with aid from their guardian angel, the Angel of the North. For the two tickets they plan to buy, they will need nearly a thousand pounds. After attempts to make money from collecting scrap and baby sitting, they eventually begin shoplifting and housebreaking. Gerry keeps the money they accumulate in a tin box at home.

Sewell, who lives with his permanently befuddled grandfather (Roy Hudd), adopts a dog who follows him after wandering away from his owner, a local thug. He also dreams of Gemma, a girl who is engaged to Zak, a muscular ice-hockey player for the Whitley Bay Warriors. At home, Gerry lives with his sickly mother (Charlie Hardwick) and his sister Clare (Tracy Whitwell) who has a baby. They are separated from their violent father Billy (Tim Healy) who has been sexually abusing Gerry's other sister Bridget (Kerry Ann Christiansen), who has run away from home. When Billy finds where they live and badly beats Gerry's mother, the family has to move to a secret location. Gerry is bribed by a social worker to attend school for two weeks, after which he will get two free football tickets. At school, he is bullied by his teacher (Kevin Whately). Gerry and Sewell attempt to rob his house in revenge, but are nearly caught. When Gerry gets the tickets he is horrified to discover that they are for a Sunderland match. After failing to sell them, the two friends watch the match at the Stadium of Light.

Billy finds the family's new flat and steals all the money Gerry has accumulated. At an empty fairground, Gerry spots Bridget, who is now a homeless drug addict, but she disappears when he leaves to get some food. After Gemma breaks up with Zak, she becomes Sewell's girlfriend. The lads' shoplifting is shown on the TV show Crimestoppers. The thug who originally owned the dog sees the show and spots the animal with Sewell. He finds and attacks him. The seemingly weak and mild-mannered Sewell floors him with a single blow on the neck. At the Newcastle United training ground at the Riverside pavilion (Chester-le-Street), they briefly meet Alan Shearer and ask him to give them season tickets, but he just laughs. They steal a sports car, which turns out to be Shearer's. Eventually they leave the car and go skinny dipping.

Sewell is delighted when Gemma reveals she is pregnant, but horrified when she goes back to her former fiancé. Sewell attacks him during an ice-hockey match and knocks him out, but is beaten up by his teammates. Gerry's mother becomes ill and is hospitalised. Gerry finds Billy, who ignores his pleas for support. Having lost all their earnings, Sewell and Gerry decide on one last major crime, a bank robbery that goes disastrously wrong; the lads are arrested. Gerry learns that Billy has been killed in a road accident. The friends are sentenced to 200 hours of community service. An old lady they work for allows them to watch Newcastle play from the balcony of her towerblock which overlooks the stadium.

== Critical response ==
Critic Robert Shail praised the film for its "toughness", saying that it has "enough grit" to depict the characters' lives "without condescension or recourse to easy solutions". In contrast, Jessica Winter in The Rough Guide to Film criticises Herman's fondness for "cloying" close-ups and "contrived melodramatic showdown[s]", saying that the film "probably didn't create many new converts to Herman's partly gritty, party feel-good socialist realist strain of filmmaking."

The Encyclopedia of Sports Films sees the film as a departure from a common depiction of football fans as hooligans, emphasising the positive communal values of the game as "an escape from the violence and despair of their homes". Adrian J. Walsh and Richard Giulianotti point to a "subtext" in the film, linking the poverty and injustice in the lads' lives to the main motivation for the plot, which arises from the fact that "entry prices in what was once the people's game have become so high as to exclude many of the traditional fan base. The film reeks with a sense of basic injustice."
