= Arthur Whybrow =

British actor (1923–2009)

Arthur Whybrow (1923 – 23 April 2009) was a British actor.

== Filmography ==
Year	Title	Role	Notes
1982	Giro City	Pickpocket	
1982	Xtro	Mr. Knight	
1983	The Wicked Lady	Storyteller at Tyburn	
1985	King David	Jesse	
1987	Personal Services	Mac	
1987	Bellman and True	The Peterman	
1989	Bearskin: An Urban Fairytale	Captain	
1997	Wilde	Doorkeeper	
1997	Healing Touch	Bill	
1998	This Could Be the Last Time	Caretaker	TV movie
2001	The Last Minute	Janitor	
2002	Spider	Ernie	
2003	Rosemary & Thyme	Bill Barnes	
2004	The Future Is Yours		TV series
