= The Riff Raff Element =

British TV series (1993–1994)

- Genre: Drama
- Written by: Debbie Horsfield
- Directed by: Jeremy Ancock
- Country of origin: United Kingdom
- Original language: English
- No. of series: 2
- No. of episodes: 12

Production
- Producer: Liz Trubridge
- Production locations: Salford, Greater Manchester, England, UK
- Running time: 50 minutes

Original release
- Network: BBC1
- Release: 2 April 1993 – 24 May 1994

The Riff Raff Element is a 1993 British television series written by Debbie Horsfield and directed by Jeremy Ancock for BBC One. The series was nominated for the British Academy Television Award for Best Drama Series in 1994.

== Plot ==
The basic plot was "the Tundishes, down-at-heel country aristocrats, are compelled to rent out their former servants' wing and live cheek-by-jowl with the vulgar Belchers from Salford" so simultaneously drawing on the English north-south divide and class divide.

== Cast ==
The Belchers

- Trevor Peacock – Acky Belcher
- Susan Brown – Maggie Belcher
- Mossie Smith – Petula Belcher
- Jayne Ashbourne – Carmen
- Cal MacAninch – Declan

The Tundishes

- Ronald Pickup – Roger Tundish
- Pippa Guard – Phoenix
- Richard Hope – Mortimer Tundish
- Celia Imrie – Joanna Tundish
- Nicholas Farrell – Boyd Tundish
- Greg Wise – Alister
- Stewart Pile – Oliver Tundish
- Stewart Bewley – Oliver Tundish
- Ashley Wright – Nathan Tundish

Others

- Lionel Guyett – Father Casper
- Dicken Ashworth – Nelson
- Kate Binchy – Dearbhla
- Brenda Bruce – Granny Grogan
- George Costigan – Vincent
