= Close and True =

2000 British television series

- Genre: Legal drama
- Written by: Tony Etchells
- Directed by: Pip Broughton; Renny Rye; Christoph Röhl
- Starring: Robson Green; James Bolam; Susan Jameson; Kerry Ann Christiansen; Jamie Bell; Nicola Grier
- Composer: Paul Pritchard
- Country of origin: United Kingdom
- Original language: English
- No. of series: 1
- No. of episodes: 6

Production
- Executive producers: Damien Timmer; Michele Buck; Sandra Jobling
- Producer: Rebecca Keane
- Running time: 50 minutes
- Production company: Coastal Productions for Meridian Broadcasting

Original release
- Network: ITV
- Release: 23 November – 28 December 2000

Close and True is a legal drama first broadcast on ITV from 23 November to 28 December 2000. It stars Robson Green and James Bolam as the eponymous characters, John Close and Graham True respectively and follows Close (Green) as he takes over a run-down legal practice, owned by True (Bolam) in Newcastle, who now resides in a mental institution. During his first days in charge of the practice, he is thrown into the midst of a murder trial despite having no criminal trial experience.

This programme was produced by Costal Productions in association with Meridian Broadcasting for the ITV network. Just six episodes of the drama were produced before it was axed by ITV in 2001. The series was released on VHS on 29 January 2001, but has never been issued on DVD in the United Kingdom. The series was released on Region 4 DVD in Australia in 2008.

== Cast ==
- Robson Green as John Close
- Susan Jameson as Sally Ann Mae
- Kerry Ann Christiansen as Kim Cotton
- James Bolam as Graham True
- Jamie Bell as Mark Sheedy
- Nicola Grier as Ibi Bagdioni
- Richard Sands as Gordon Short
- Pamela Ruddock as Mary Close
- Louise Delamere as Jessica Laing
- Kerry Rolfe as Paula Farrent
- Mark Moraghan as Steve Sheedy
- Melanie Hill as Maureen Taylor
- Peter Sullivan as Peter Heart

== Episodes ==
No.	Title	Directed by	Written by	Original release date	Viewers (millions)
1	"Miss Newcastle"	Pip Broughton	Tony Etchells	23 November 2000	8.56
While on a diving holiday, John Close receives a call from his old Newcastle friend Steve Sheedy, who has been remanded in jail on an attempted murder charge. Steve begs John to help him, and although his background isn't criminal law, decides to give it a go and finds himself in over his head. John becomes involved with mismanaged legal firm Simons and True in Newcastle, run by Colin Simons. He allows John to use the firm's services for a few days leading to Steve's trial. The alleged victim is Steve's ex-wife Paula's boyfriend, David. When David later dies, the charges rise to murder. Although he confesses that he didn't do it, and evidence points to Sinclair over monetary matters, it is Steve and Paula's son, Mark, who holds the key to what really happened.
2	"Town and Gown"	Pip Broughton	Tony Etchells	30 November 2000	7.43
Close visits Graham True after Simons takes some of the firm's money and runs to Darwin, Australia. Close wants to rebuild the practice but True is not so enthusiastic. Meanwhile, John begins to take over Simons's cases, one of them being an assault on a woman at a nightclub.
3	"A Lie for a Lie"	Renny Rye	Tony Etchells	7 December 2000	7.76
After working for two months in criminal law, John gets himself on the duty solicitor roster. Eileen Jakes is charged with threatening her ex-pimp Terry Morgan and is fearful of losing her daughter Annie. She asks John to handle her custody case. Meanwhile, John asks to move in with Paula at Mark's request. Kim says the office is haunted.
4	"Hurry Up and Wait"	Renny Rye	Tony Etchells	14 December 2000	6.70
Jessica accepts John's proposal.
5	"Wide Awake"	Christoph Röhl	Tony Etchells	21 December 2000	6.79
John's relationship with Paula develops.
6	"Gotcha!"	Christoph Röhl	Tony Etchells	28 December 2000	6.62
Steve Sheedy is out on bail awaiting a retrial, and John comes up against his old foe, Peter Heart.
