= Jamie Bell =

English actor (born 1986)

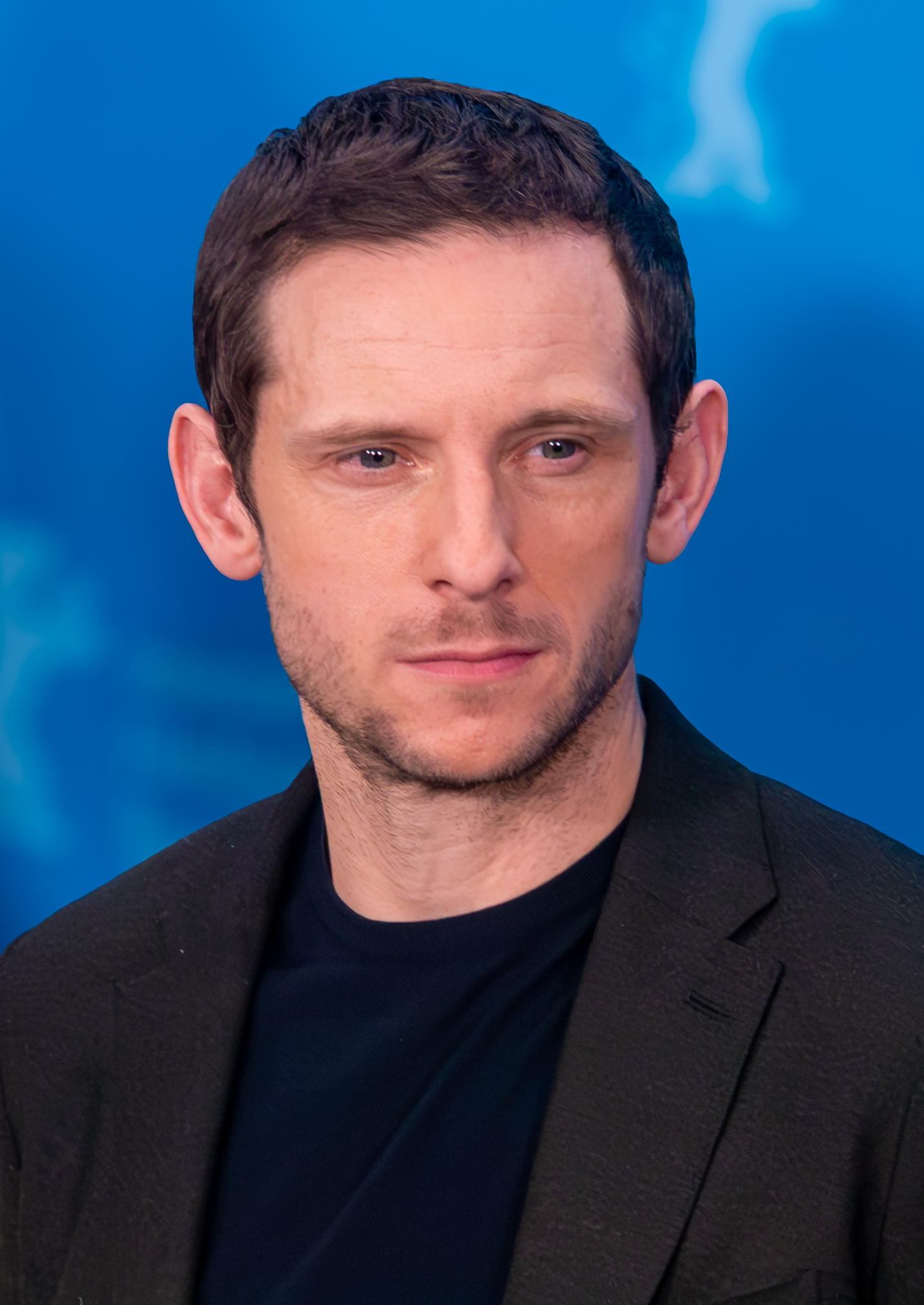
- Bell in 2026
- Born: Andrew James Matfin Bell; 14 March 1986 (age 40); Billingham, County Durham, England
- Occupation: Actor
- Years active: 2000–present
- Spouses: Evan Rachel Wood (m. 2012; div. 2014); Kate Mara (m. 2017)
- Children: 3

Andrew James Matfin Bell (born 14 March 1986) is an English actor. He rose to prominence with his debut performance in Billy Elliot (2000), for which he won the BAFTA Award for Best Actor, becoming the youngest-ever winner in the category. He is also known for his portrayals of Tintin in The Adventures of Tintin (2011) and Ben Grimm/The Thing in Fantastic Four (2015).

Other notable film credits include Deathwatch and Nicholas Nickleby (2002); King Kong (2005); Jumper (2008); Jane Eyre (2011); Man on a Ledge (2012); Snowpiercer, Filth, and Nymphomaniac (2013); Rocketman (2019); and All of Us Strangers (2023). He earned a second BAFTA nomination for his leading role in Film Stars Don't Die in Liverpool (2017). On television, Bell starred as Abraham Woodhull in the AMC historical drama series Turn: Washington's Spies (2014–2017) and as Niall Kennedy in the joint BBC & HBO six-part television drama Half Man (2026).

== Early life ==
Andrew James Matfin Bell was born on 14 March 1986 in Billingham, Teesside, England, where he grew up with his mother, Eileen Matfin and his elder sister Kathryn. His father, John Bell, a toolmaker, left before Jamie was born. Bell began his involvement with dancing after he accompanied his sister to her ballet lessons.

== Career ==
=== 2000s ===
In 1999, Bell was chosen from a field of over 2,000 boys for the role of Billy Elliot, an 11-year-old boy who dismays his working-class widowed father and elder brother by taking up ballet. Bell's performance received widespread acclaim, and 14-year-old Bell won London Film Critics' Circle Award for British Newcomer of the Year, British Independent Film Award for Best Newcomer, Evening Standard British Film Award for Most Promising Newcomer, and BAFTA Award for Best Actor in a Leading Role, becoming one of the youngest winners of the awards. His lack of an Oscar nomination was met with criticism. He also appeared in Close and True, an ITV legal drama shown in 2000, which starred Robson Green, James Bolam, Kerry Ann Christiansen and Susan Jameson.

Bell served as Honorary Jury President of the 2001 Giffoni Film Festival. In 2002, he appeared as the disabled servant Smike in an adaptation of Nicholas Nickleby and a young soldier in Deathwatch. In the following years, he portrayed a teenager on the run in Undertow, a gun-toting pacifist in Dear Wendy, a disaffected Southern California teenager in The Chumscrubber, and the young Jimmy in the 2005 film version of King Kong. Also in 2005, he starred opposite Evan Rachel Wood in the Green Day video "Wake Me Up When September Ends", directed by Samuel Bayer. In 2007, he played the title character in Hallam Foe – for which he was nominated for the best actor award at the British Independent Film Awards – and appeared as himself in lonelygirl15 spin-off KateModern. He had roles in two 2008 films: the sci-fi film Jumper and the World War II drama Defiance. In the second film he plays Asael Bielski, the third of the Bielski Brothers, leaders of a partisan group that saved 1,200 lives during the Holocaust.

In 2009, producers announced that Bell would play the title role in the motion capture film The Adventures of Tintin, alongside Andy Serkis and Daniel Craig. The film was released in 2011.

=== 2010s ===
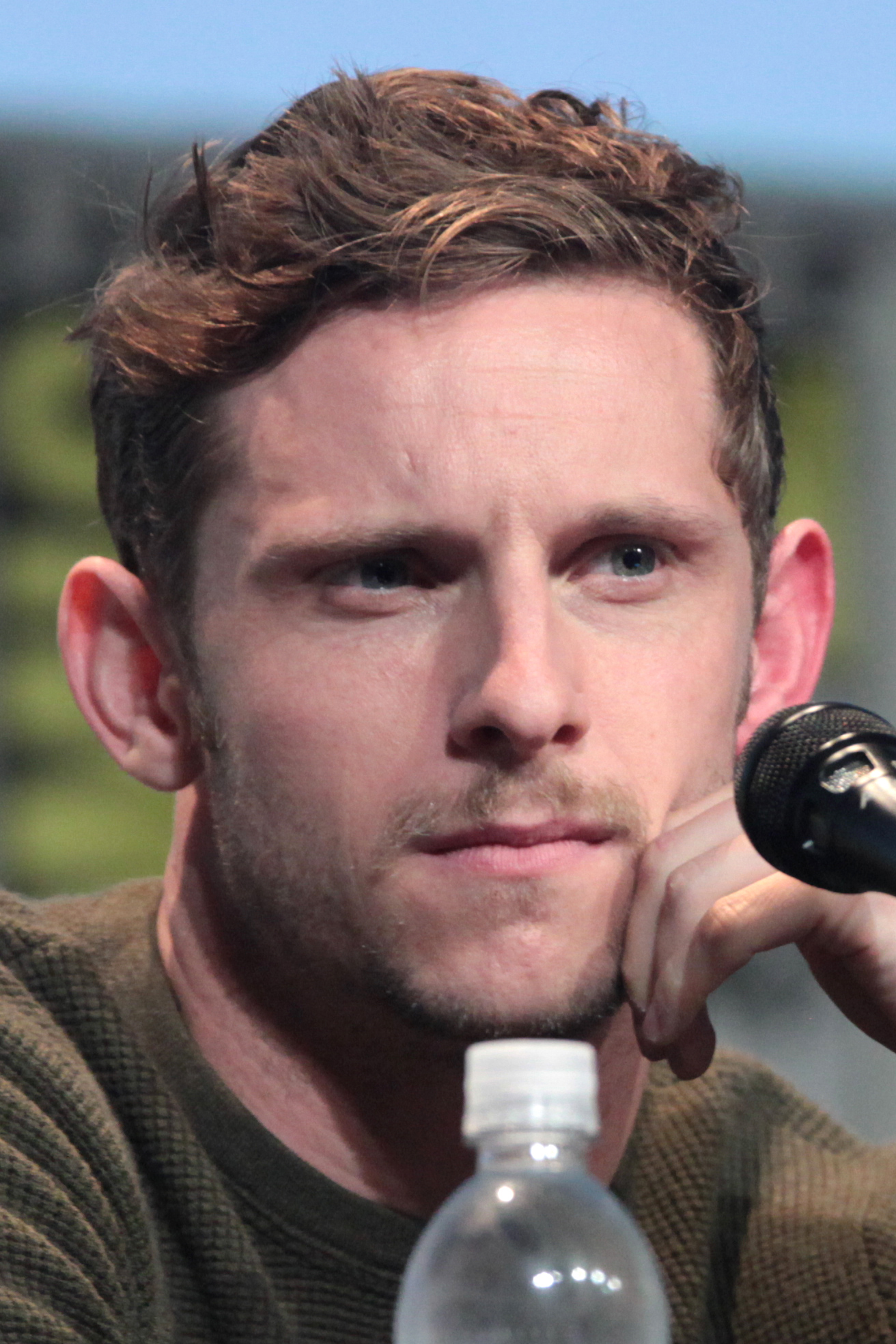
Bell at the 2015 San Diego Comic-Con

Bell appeared in a number of films during the early 2010s, beginning with the 2011 films The Eagle as Esca and Jane Eyre as St John Rivers. In 2013, he starred alongside James McAvoy in the film Filth and appeared as Edgar in Snowpiercer.

From 2014 to 2017, Bell appeared as Abraham Woodhull in Turn: Washington's Spies. In 2015, he played the Thing in the Fantastic Four reboot. The film would go down in infamy as one of the worst comic book films ever made. In 2022, Bell would say of it, "I don't think [it deserves a second look.] Save your money, save your time."

In 2017, Bell had starring roles in 6 Days and Film Stars Don't Die in Liverpool. The latter earned him a nomination for the BAFTA Award for Best Actor in a Leading Role. In 2019, he had a supporting role as Bernie Taupin in the biographical musical film based on the life of Elton John, Rocketman.

In 2023, he appeared in the critically acclaimed movie All of Us Strangers as the protagonist's father.

In April 2026, it was announced that Bell will take over the role of Duke Shelby, the son of Tommy Shelby (Cillian Murphy), in the unnamed Peaky Blinders sequel series that takes place 10 years after Peaky Blinders: The Immortal Man.

== Personal life ==
Bell dated American actress Evan Rachel Wood for a year in 2005 after they had met at the Sundance Film Festival. Wood was aware of the false claims that they had first met while co-starring in the music video for Green Day's song "Wake Me Up When September Ends" and has stated they were "already dating and very much in love by that point." Five years later, in mid-2011, it was reported that Bell and Wood had rekindled their relationship. The couple married in a small ceremony in California on 30 October 2012. They have one son, born in July 2013. The couple announced that they had separated on 28 May 2014.

Starting in 2020, Wood and Bell were in dispute over the custody of their son. Bell said he was deprived of contact with him when Wood moved from Los Angeles to Nashville; Wood claimed she did this to protect the child from former fiancé Marilyn Manson. Bell argued in court that Wood's story defied credibility, and accused her of "withholding our son from me for other reasons of her own invention." In May 2023, Wood accepted terms for their son staying in Los Angeles with Bell, while seeing him "one extended weekend per month" and holidays.

In late 2015, Bell began dating his Fantastic Four co-star Kate Mara, and in January 2017 the couple became engaged. On 17 July 2017, they announced that they had married. They have a daughter, born in May 2019. On 17 November 2022, his wife announced on her Instagram account that she had given birth to a son in the previous week.

Bell is an atheist. He is a keen football fan and supporter of Arsenal F.C.

== Filmography ==
=== Film ===
Year	Title	Role	Notes
2000	Billy Elliot	Billy Elliot	
2002	Deathwatch	Pvt. Charlie Shakespeare	
2002	Nicholas Nickleby	Smike	
2004	Undertow	Chris Munn	
2005	Dear Wendy	Dick Dandelion	
2005	The Chumscrubber	Dean Stifle	
2005	King Kong	Jimmy	
2006	Flags of Our Fathers	Ralph "Iggy" Ignatowski	
2007	Hallam Foe	Hallam Foe	
2008	Jumper	Griffin O'Conner	
2008	Defiance	Asael Bielski	
2011	The Eagle	Esca	
2011	Jane Eyre	St. John Rivers	
2011	Retreat	Pvt. Jack Coleman	
2011	The Adventures of Tintin	Tintin	
2012	Man on a Ledge	Joey Cassidy	
2013	Snowpiercer	Edgar	
2013	Filth	Ray Lennox	
2013	Nymphomaniac	K	
2015	Fantastic Four	Ben Grimm / The Thing	
2017	Film Stars Don't Die in Liverpool	Peter Turner	
2017	6 Days	Rusty Firmin	
2018	Donnybrook	Jarhead Earl	
2018	Skin	Bryon Widner	
2019	Rocketman	Bernie Taupin	
2020	Cranston Academy: Monster Zone	Danny	Voice only
2021	Without Remorse	Robert Ritter	
2023	Surrounded	Tommy Walsh	
2023	All of Us Strangers	Adam's father	
2026	Rosebush Pruning	Jack	
2026	The Uprising	John Ball	

=== Television ===
Year	Title	Role	Notes
2000	Close and True	Mark Sheedy	5 episodes
2014–2017	TURN: Washington's Spies	Abraham Woodhull	Main role, 40 episodes
2022	Shining Girls	Harper Curtis	Main role, 8 episodes
2026	Half Man	Niall Kennedy	Main role, 6 episodes
TBA	Peaky Blinders	Duke Shelby	Main role

=== Video games ===
Year	Title	Role	Notes
2005	King Kong	Jimmy	
2008	Jumper: Griffin's Story	Griffin O'Conner	

=== Music videos ===
Year	Title	Artist(s)	Notes
2005	"Wake Me Up When September Ends"	Green Day	

== Accolades ==
Year	Nominated work	Award	Result
2000	Billy Elliot	BAFTA Award for Best Actor in a Leading Role	Won
2000	Billy Elliot	British Independent Film Award for Best Newcomer	Won
2000	Billy Elliot	Broadcast Film Critics Association Award for Best Young Performer	Won
2000	Billy Elliot	Empire Award for Best Debut	Won
2000	Billy Elliot	Evening Standard British Film Award for Most Promising Newcomer	Won
2000	Billy Elliot	London Film Critics' Circle Award for British Newcomer of the Year	Won
2000	Billy Elliot	National Board of Review Award for Outstanding Young Actor	Won
2000	Billy Elliot	Young Artist Award for Best Young Actor in an International Film	Won
2000	Billy Elliot	Chicago Film Critics Association Award for Most Promising Actor	Nominated
2000	Billy Elliot	European Film Award for Best Actor	Nominated
2000	Billy Elliot	Online Film Critics Society Award for Best Breakthrough Performance	Nominated
2000	Billy Elliot	Satellite Award for Best Actor – Motion Picture Drama	Nominated
2000	Billy Elliot	Screen Actors Guild Award for Outstanding Performance by a Male Actor in a Leading Role	Nominated
2000	Billy Elliot	Screen Actors Guild Award for Outstanding Performance by a Cast in a Motion Picture	Nominated
2000	Billy Elliot	Teen Choice Award for Choice Movie Breakout Performance	Nominated
2001	Billy Elliot	MTV Movie Award for Best Dance Sequence (shared with Julie Walters)	Nominated
2002	Nicholas Nickleby	National Board of Review Award for Best Cast	Won
2002	Nicholas Nickleby	Young Artist Award for Best Performance in a Feature Film – Leading Young Actor	Nominated
2004	Undertow	Young Artist Award for Best Performance in a Feature Film – Leading Young Actor	Won
2005	Peter Jackson's King Kong: The Official Game of the Movie	Spike Video Game Award for Best Cast	Won
2007	Hallam Foe	BAFTA Scotland Award for Best Actor	Nominated
2007	Hallam Foe	British Independent Film Award for Best Actor	Nominated
2008	Jumper	MTV Movie Award for Best Fight (shared with Hayden Christensen)	Nominated
2013	Nymphomaniac	Bodil Award for Best Supporting Actor	Nominated
2013	Nymphomaniac	Robert Awards for Best Supporting Actor	Nominated
2016	Fantastic Four	Golden Raspberry Award for Worst Screen Combo (shared with Kate Mara, Michael B. Jordan, and Miles Teller)	Nominated
2018	Film Stars Don't Die in Liverpool	BAFTA Award for Best Actor in a Leading Role	Nominated
2018	Film Stars Don't Die in Liverpool	British Independent Film Award for Best Actor	Nominated
2018	Film Stars Don't Die in Liverpool	Evening Standard British Film Awards for Best Actor	Nominated
2018	Film Stars Don't Die in Liverpool	Hollywood Film Awards for New Hollywood Award	Won
2023	All of Us Strangers	British Independent Film Awards for Best Supporting Performance	Nominated
2026	Half Man	Astra TV Award for Best Supporting Actor in a Limited Series or TV Movie	Nominated
2026	Half Man	Dorian TV Awards for Best Leading TV Performance – Drama	Nominated
2026	Half Man	Gotham TV Awards for Outstanding Lead Performance in a Limited or Anthology Series	Nominated
2026	Half Man	National Film Awards for Best Supporting Actor in a TV Series	Nominated

== See also ==
- List of British actors
