= Bellman and True =

- Theatrical release poster
- Directed by: Richard Loncraine
- Written by: Richard Loncraine; Desmond Lowden; Michael Wearing
- Based on: Bellman and True by Desmond Lowden
- Produced by: Christopher Neame; Michael Wearing
- Starring: Bernard Hill; Derek Newark; Richard Hope; Ken Bones; Frances Tomelty; Kieran O'Brien
- Cinematography: Ken Westbury
- Edited by: Paul Green
- Music by: Colin Towns
- Distributed by: HandMade Films
- Release dates: November 1987 (London Film Festival); 15 April 1988 (UK)
- Running time: 112 minutes
- Country: United Kingdom
- Language: English
- Budget: £3 million
- Box office: $226,944

Bellman and True is a 1988 film based on the 1975 novel of the same name by Desmond Lowden. The film was written and directed by Richard Loncraine. It stars Bernard Hill, Derek Newark and Richard Hope.

The title comes from an old Cumberland song "D’ye ken John Peel", specifically the lyric:

Yes, I ken John Peel and Ruby too,
Ranter and Ringwood, Bellman and True.
From a find to a check, from a check to a view,
From a view to a death in the morning.

The title uses a pun in the term Bellman which in the film's case refers to a criminal who specialises in disabling intruder alarm systems.

== Plot ==
Hiller arrives at Paddington station in London with a boy following a stay in Torquay. They do not realise they are being tailed by Gort as they check into a nearby hotel. A few days later, the child is kidnapped by Gort and Hiller is also captured: both are taken to a derelict house where he encounters Salto. Hiller is a computer programmer who Salto had bribed to obtain details of the security system at a bank near Heathrow Airport. Salto is angry because he asked for documents and Hiller only sent him a computer tape he cannot decipher. After disappointing Salto, Hiller went into hiding with the boy and lost his job. The boy is Hiller's wife's son. When he returns to his house, he discovers that the boy's mother has left him.

Hiller and The Boy are kept captive while Hiller is forced by threats of violence to decode the tape. When he succeeds, Salto has the information he needs to rob the bank. Salto obtains finance for the robbery and recruits The Guv’nor to mastermind it. The Bellman identifies that the bank alarm system is sophisticated and has anti-interference safeguards. Hiller explains how to beat them and is recruited as the new Bellman. The gang decide to act just before Christmas when the bank will hold more cash than usual.

On the night of the robbery, the gang intentionally trigger the alarm. The guards, finding nothing, assume the call is false whilst the gang actually use a small window of time to enter the bank, allowing The Peterman to determine how to access the basement vault area. Knowing that after the fourth callout, the guards will remain in the bank with the alarm disabled until the following morning, the gang remain in the basement.

They use a thermic lance to cut through the vault door and steal £13 million. They then release tear gas to disorientate the guards and escape in a getaway car driven by The Wheelman. At a changeover point, they switch from the car to a van. On the journey to an unspecified location, they hear that the security guard dog handler has died. The Guv'nor is frightened that he has broken a criminal code of conduct that no one gets hurt and is afraid that the identity of the gang will be made known to the police. He changes his plans and the gang travel to the beach next to Dungeness Nuclear Power Station. Salto later arrives with the boy.

At the beach, The Guv’nor informs Hiller that the boy and others will go abroad in a private plane while Hiller will stay in the United Kingdom to have plastic surgery. The Guv’nor actually intends to kill Hiller, but before he can, Hiller steals a gun and runs into a nearby building where he earlier created an improvised explosive device using a propane gas cylinder. This explodes after he has escaped, killing the Guv’nor and the others while Hiller escapes in the van, with Salto driving. They make it to the aeroplane pick-up point, but Salto was wounded after he was shot following the explosion and dies in a pillbox. The plane sent to pick them up does not land and Hiller and the boy drive to Heathrow Airport. They use the false passports intended for their getaway and arrive for a flight to Rio de Janeiro already booked for them. On the plane, Hiller is tense and thinks he is will be arrested when policemen come aboard the flight. It transpires that the plane is transporting human organs. The film ends with the plane taking off.

== Cast ==
The film gives very little clue to the complete identity of the characters. Very few names are used and the characters are referred to by either their first name or surname only or by an alternative term. Terms such as the Guv’nor (boss), Bellman (alarm disabler), Peterman (safebreaker) and Wheelman (getaway driver) are used to hide the identity of the characters.

First billed cast:

- Bernard Hill as Hiller
- Derek Newark as Guv'nor
- Richard Hope as Salto
- Ken Bones as Gort
- Frances Tomelty as Anna
- Kieran O'Brien as The Boy
- John Kavanagh as Donkey
- Arthur Whybrow as The Peterman
- Jim Dowdall as The Wheelman
- Peter Howell as The Bellman
- Kate McEnery as Mo
- Anne Carroll as Pauline
- Richard Strange as Man with Walkman
- Peter Jonfield as Security Sergeant
- Andrew Paul as Young Security Guard

== Production ==
Desmond Lowden's original novel was published in 1975 and adapted for radio in 1983.

Film rights were optioned by Verity Lambert at Euston Films. When she left the project was taken over by John Hambley who interested Michael Wearing, a producer at the BBC, in making it as a three episode mini series, running at a total of 150 minutes. (Wearing had produced Jake's End, a 1981 television drama based on a script by Lowden.) Wearing brought in director Richard Loncraine and he worked on the script. The budget was too high for a television mini series so it was divided to make two versions, one for television and another 120 minute version one for film. Locraine had just made The Missionary for Handmade Films who agreed to provide the balance of the budget in exchange for theatrical rights. Loncraine described it as "a good yarn".

The script had to be updated from 1975 to the 1980s. Loncraine wanted to shoot the film in black and white "for artistic rather than arty reasons". He was not allowed to but managed to give the film what he described as a "Van Eyck wash".

Filming started November 1986 and took place mostly in locations in London. The opening scenes were filmed in and around Paddington Station and the hotel where Hiller stays is near Praed Street. The scene where Hiller is being chased was filmed in Bayswater with Redan Place and the then closed Whiteleys department store visible in shots. The scene where the Guv’nor threatens Hiller by the side of the motorway was filmed on the M25 between junctions 14 and 15 next to the Colnbrook bypass overbridge. The scenes following the robbery were filmed at Dungeness Beach next to Dungeness Power Station. The closing scenes were filmed in Terminal 4 of Heathrow Airport.

According to Christopher Neame, who worked on the film as a producer, production was difficult and plagued by bad weather, resulting in it going overbudget.

== Reception ==
The film debuted at the London Film Festival in November 1987. It was released theatrically in April 1988.

The Independent called it "unsatisfactorily cut." The Observer called it "unconvincing". The Sunday Telegraph felt it was "a cliche ridden caper."

According to Christopher Neame "The theatrical film of Bellman and True was critically acclaimed in the United States, but one doubts it showed much of a profit (if any), as it is “art house” material rather than mainstream." He also says sections of the book were used in the film The Real McCoy.

== Home media release ==
The 112 minute film version is available on DVD. In 2019 Indicator released a Blu-ray consisting of both the original theatrical cut and an extended version that, at 122 minutes, runs around eight minutes longer.

== Notes ==
- Neame, Christopher (2004). A take on British TV drama : stories from the golden years. Scarecrow Press.
