= Margaret Harkness =

English radical journalist and writer

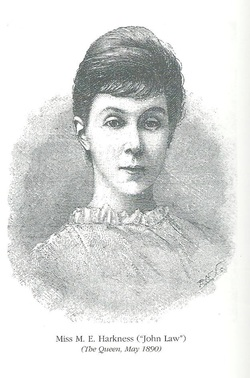
- Margaret Harkness aka John Law in 1890
- Born: 28 February 1854; Upton-upon-Severn
- Died: 10 December 1923 (aged 69); Florence
- Occupations: Writer, journalist
- Writing career
- Pen name: John Law
- Movement: Social realism

Margaret Elise Harkness (28 February 1854 – 10 December 1923), also known under her pen name John Law, was an English radical journalist and writer.

== Life ==
Harkness was born on 28 February 1854 at Upton-on-Severn in Worcestershire. Her parents were Robert and Elizabeth Bolton Harkness. Her father, Robert (1836–1886), was an Anglican priest. She had four siblings and a half sister as her mother had been widowed before she married her father. Her second cousin was the economist Beatrice Webb. She was sent to finishing school at Stirling House in Bournemouth. She is thought to have taken the name "Law" as part of her pen name because it was her grandmother's maiden name and because she was also a relation of Bishop George Henry Law.

== Work ==
After attending a finishing school, Stirling House in Bournemouth, she left home at the age of 23 to make her living. She there trained as a nurse and worked as a dispenser at Guy's Hospital London. Harkness lived in various locations in London, occasionally with her cousin, Beatrice Potter (who later married Sidney Webb). Beatrice Potter had a difficult relationship with a Radical politician, Joseph Chamberlain, that ultimately foundered. Harkness herself eschewed marriage as a result of which her father refused to fund her independent life. Instead, Harkness supported herself through writing, both novels and journalism. When she died in 1923 in Italy, her death certificate described her as "a spinster of independent means."

== Author ==
In her works of social investigation, Harkness uses a tone of social realism or naturalism, making her different from her male contemporaries. With the financial assistance of her sister and Beatrice Webb, she was able to continue living in London and become a writer. In 1883 she wrote Assyrian Life and History and the following year Egyptian Life and History according to the Monuments. She was introduced to socialism and a group of people who based themselves at the British Museum Reading Room; her friends included her sister Katie, Eleanor Marx, Olive Schreiner, and Annie Besant. Susan David Bernstein argues that this group of women enacted a "transformation of women's work that "entails a proliferation of women's labor across private homes and public spaces." In 1887 she published A City Girl. Engels advised her that she should make the book more realistic particularly in her depiction of the working-class characters who he felt she depicted as passive (although he owned that the people of the East End were less"actively resistant" than elsewhere in the world.. .

In 1888, she wrote her novel Out of Work included descriptions of what happened in Trafalgar Square on 13 November 1887. On that day actions by the police to control a demonstration by the unemployed resulted in injuries, one death, and many arrests. One of the arrests was of the socialist John Burns who she would later work with, together with Tom Mann and Henry Hyde Champion, editor of the socialist paper Justice. The novel Captain Lobe followed in 1889. This was later republished as In Darkest London. She put her politics into action during the London Dock Strike that year when she is thought to have influenced Cardinal Manning who successfully interceded in the dispute.

In 1905, she published George Eastmont: Wanderer about her life during the 1889 Docks strike when she was briefly a member of the Social Democratic Federation. She described the conditions of the poor in London but she did not make it clear about her contact with Bishop Manning although the book was dedicated to him.

Her book In Darkest London documents poverty in the East End and the Salvation Army's approach to the problem. She wrote a book about Indian life which was published as Glimpses of Hidden India in 1907 and as Indian Snapshots in 1912.

At the end of her life, she lived in France and then Italy. Her last work A Curate's Promise: a Story of Three Weeks was published in 1921 and she died in Florence in 1923.

== Selected bibliography ==
=== Fiction ===
- A City Girl; London: Vizetelly & Co., 1887); Victorian Secrets, 2015; Broadview Press, 2017.
- Out of Work; London: Swan Sonnenschein & Co., 1888; London: Merlin, 1990.
- Captain Lobe: A Story of the Salvation Army; London: Hodder & Stoughton, 1889; republished as In Darkest London, 1891; Black Apollo Press, 2009.
- A Manchester Shirtmaker; London: Authors' Co-operative Publishing Co., 1890.
- Roses and Crucifix; novel serialised in Woman’s Herald, 1891-2.
- Connie; novel serialised in Labour Elector, 1893-4. [unfinished]
- George Eastmont: Wanderer; London: Burns & Oates, 1905.
- The Horoscope; London: W. Thacker & Co., 1913.
- A Curate’s Promise: A Story of Three Weeks, September 14-October 5 1917; London: Hodder & Stoughton, 1921; Shield Books, 2021.

=== Non-Fiction ===
- Assyrian Life and History; London: Religious Tract Society, 1883.
- Egyptian Life and History according to the Monuments; London: Religious Tract Society, 1884.
- Toilers in London: or Inquiries concerning Female Labour in the Metropolis; London: Hodder & Stoughton, 1889.
- Imperial Credit; Adelaide: Vardon and Pritchard, 1899.
- Glimpses of Hidden India; Calcutta: Thacker, Spink & Co., 1907; republished as Indian Snapshots, 1912.
- Modern Hyderabad; Calcutta: Thacker, Spink & Co., 1914.
