= Jonathan Tulloch =

British author and naturalist

Jonathan Tulloch is a British author, naturalist, and former teacher at St Thomas More Blaydon, who writes regular nature features for The Times and The Tablet. His 2000 novel The Season Ticket was adapted into the film Purely Belter and serialised on BBC Radio 4. Tulloch's books have received reviews from "wholly absorbing" to "a pitch-perfect realisation of the bleak mundanity of daily life".

The Season Ticket by Jonathan Tulloch

He was born in Cumbria, and has also lived in Gateshead, South Africa and Bagby.

Tulloch was Green Party candidate in Stillington Ward for the 2013 North Yorkshire County Council election. He came second with 17% of the vote.

== Personal life ==
Tulloch has a son.

== Awards ==
- 2000, Betty Trask Award for The Season Ticket
- 2003, J.B. Priestley Award for The Lottery
- 2009, K. Blundell Award for The Lottery

== Books ==
- The Season Ticket (2000, adults)
- The Bonny Lad (2002, adults)
- The Lottery (2004, adults)
- I Am A Cloud, I Can Blow Anywhere (2007, children)
- Give Us This Day (2007, adults)
- A Winding Road (2011, adults)
- Mr McCool (2012, children)
- Larkinland (2017, adults)
- Glimpses of Eden (London, 2019) ISBN 9780232533804
- Cuckoo Summer (2022, children)
