= Ten Bells =

Pub in Spitalfields, London

Coordinates: 51°31′9.66″N 0°4′27.61″W

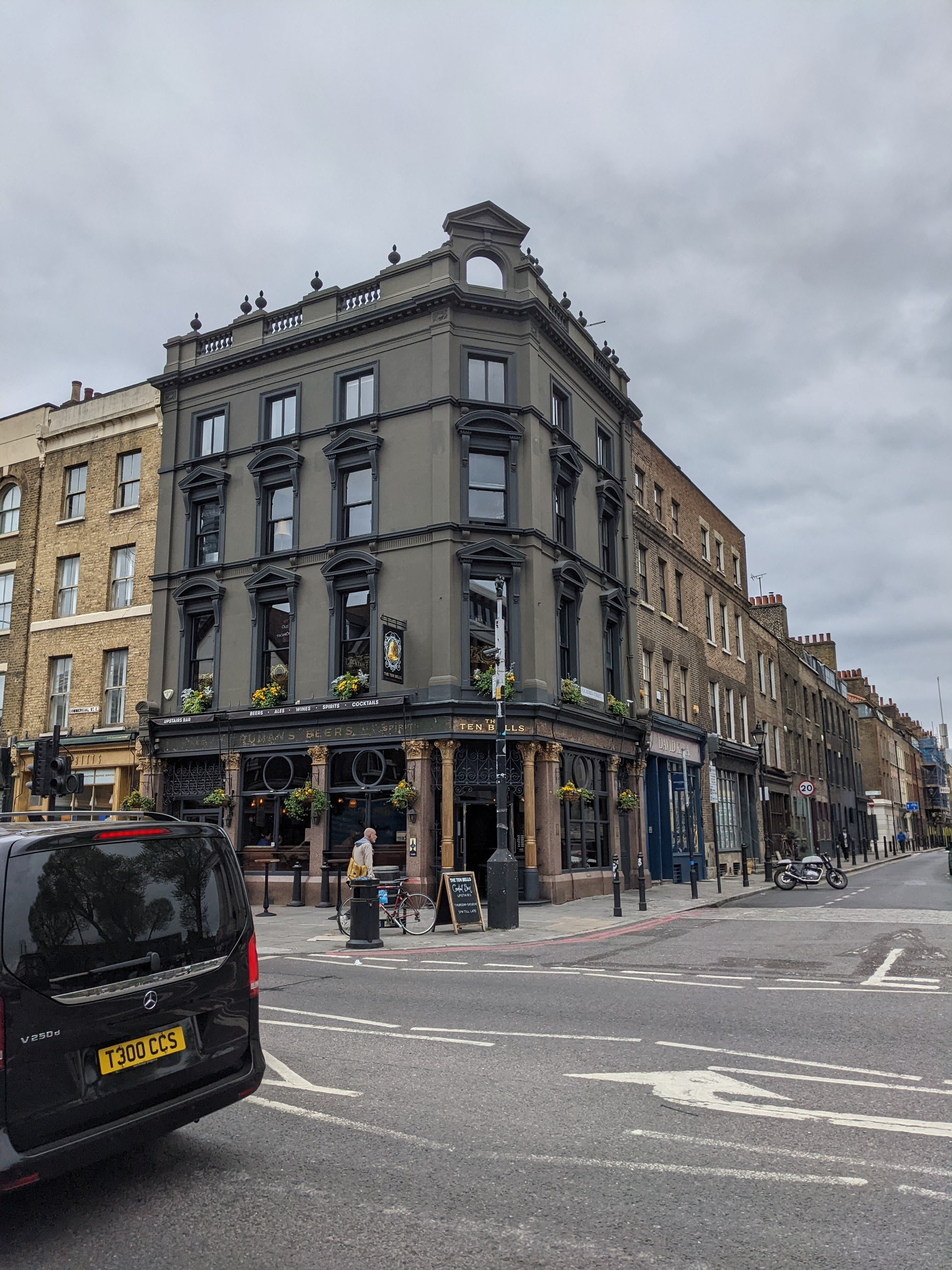
Outside Ten Bells Public House, Spitalfields

The Ten Bells is a public house at the corner of Commercial Street and Fournier Street in Spitalfields in the East End of London. It is sometimes noted for its supposed association with at least two victims of Jack the Ripper: Annie Chapman and Mary Jane Kelly.

== History ==
The Ten Bells pub has existed in one guise or another since at least the middle of the 18th century. It originally stood on a site known as 12 Red Lion Street, just a few metres away. However, when this building was pulled down as part of the cutting of Commercial Street in 1851, the owners of the Ten Bells (Truman Hanbury Buxton & Co) were able to move the public house to its current position at 84 Commercial Street (at one time known as 33 Church Street).

The name of the pub has changed over time, but those names have generally derived from the number of bells in the "peal" housed in the Nicholas Hawksmoor-designed Christ Church, Spitalfields next door.

In 1755 it was known as the "Eight Bells Alehouse". The name is likely to have changed in 1788 when the church installed a new set of chimes, this time with ten bells; certainly, there are insurance records to show that the pub was registered as "the Ten Bells, Church Street, Spitalfields" from 1794. The number of bells in the church increased to twelve at one point and were subsequently reduced to its current number of eight after a fire in the steeple in 1836. However, save for a brief deviation from the theme (see below), the "Ten Bells" name has stuck.

The interior of the pub is decorated floor to ceiling with original Victorian tiling. Two of the walls feature a blue and white floral pattern tiling scheme and there is a colourful tiled dado going round the room. Of particular note is the mural of painted tiles on the wall on the north side of the building, entitled Spitalfields in ye Olden Time – visiting a Weaver's Shop, which commemorates the weaving heritage of the area. The mural was designed by the firm of W. B. Simpson and Sons and dates from the late 19th century.

The Ten Bells was renovated by landlord John Twomey in December 2010 to fully display the pub's Victorian heritage. The renovation also included the addition of a new mural titled Spitalfields in Modern Times. This was painted by artist Ian Harper. Rather than feature the weavers of the 19th century, the painting features 21st century Spitalfields scenes and characters, such as Gilbert and George.

The building was designated a Grade II listed building in 1973.

== Jack the Ripper ==
Some accounts of the Jack the Ripper story link two of his victims, Annie Chapman and Mary Jane Kelly, to the pub: Annie Chapman may have drunk at the pub shortly before she was murdered; and it has been suggested that the pavement outside of the pub was where Mary Kelly picked up clients as a prostitute. Between 1976 and 1988, the public house was named "The Jack the Ripper", and memorabilia relating to the case were displayed in the bars. The brewery ordered the change back to its original name after a long campaign by Reclaim the Night demanded that a murderer of women should not be commemorated in such a fashion. The pub is mentioned in the graphic novel From Hell (1999), about Jack the Ripper, by writer Alan Moore and artist Eddie Campbell. The film adaptation From Hell (2001), also features the pub, including a scene showing Johnny Depp (as Inspector Abberline) having a drink with Ripper victim Mary Kelly.

== Current use ==
In October 2011, the Ten Bells was featured in the Jamie Oliver series Jamie's Great Britain. Oliver's great-great-grandfather was a landlord of the pub during the 1880s. Oliver is shown visiting the Ten Bells to discuss his East London roots, and to see how Londoners lived, drank and ate at the end of the 19th century.
