= Brick Lane Mosque =

Congregational mosque in London, England

Brick Lane Jamme Masjid
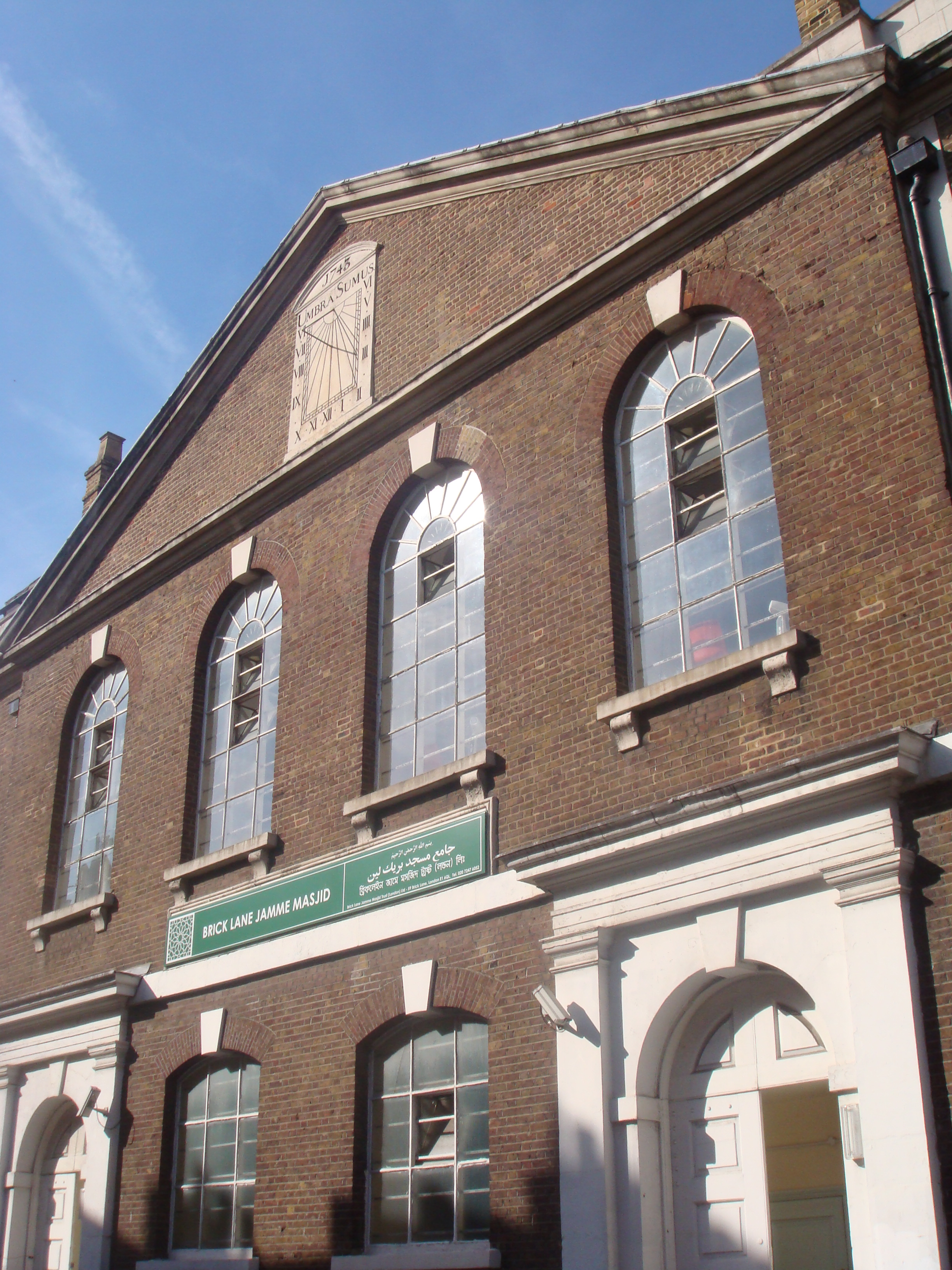

Religion
- Affiliation: Sunni
- Leadership: Imam(s): Maulana Nazrul Islam, Maulana Mufti Maruf Ahmed; Chairman: Hamidur Rahman Choudhury

Location
- Location: Brick Lane, Tower Hamlets, London, United Kingdom
- Interactive map of Brick Lane Jamme Masjid
- Coordinates: 51°31′9.6″N 0°4′20″W

Architecture
- Type: Mosque
- Style: Georgian architecture
- Established: 1743 (built), 1976 (mosque)

Specifications
- Capacity: 3,200 (including women)
- Minaret: 1

Website
- bricklanemasjid.co.uk

Brick Lane Mosque or Brick Lane Jamme Masjid (Arabic: جامع مسجد بريك لين "Brick Lane Congregational Mosque"), previously known as the London Jamme Masjid (جامع مسجد لندن "London Congregational Mosque"), is a Muslim place of worship in Central London and is in the East End of London which serves the British Bangladeshi community.

The building at 59 Brick Lane, on the corner of Fournier Street, has been home to a succession of Christian, Jewish, and Muslim (Note: Especially from Bangladesh) communities since its construction in the mid-eighteenth century, reflecting the waves of immigration in the neighbourhood of Spitalfields. The former Great Synagogue is a Grade II* listed building; the adjacent former school buildings (now used as an ancillary building to the mosque) is listed Grade II.

== History ==
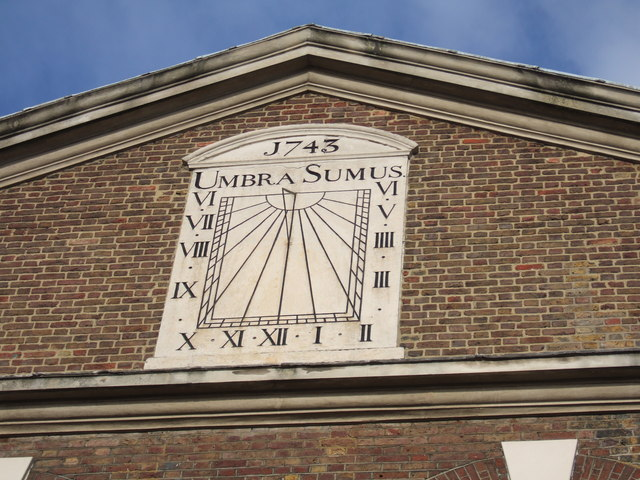
Detail of the sundial. The Latin motto, Umbra sumus ("We are shadow"), is derived from Horace's Pulvis et umbra sumus ("We are dust and shadow").

The building has served the religions of a succession of other communities in the area.

=== Christian ===
It was first established in 1743 as a Protestant chapel ("La Neuve Eglise", i.e. "the New Church") by London's Huguenot community. These were refugees who had left France after the Revocation of the Edict of Nantes in 1685, to escape persecution by the Catholics. Many Huguenots settled in Spitalfields, bringing with them their silk-weaving and textile skills. As they were Protestant Dissenters, not members of the Church of England, they built their own chapels. Christ Church, Spitalfields on Fournier Street, designed by the architect Nicholas Hawksmoor, was built during the reign of Queen Anne to demonstrate the power of the established church. 59 Brick Lane survived as a Huguenot chapel for more than six decades.

In 1809 it became a Wesleyan chapel, known as The Jews' Chapel, rented by the London Society for Promoting Christianity Amongst the Jews, an organisation now known as the Church's Ministry Among Jewish People, but this phase of its history lasted only 10 years. From 1819, the building became a Methodist chapel.

=== Jewish ===
In 1891, the building was adopted by yet another community: it became the Machzike Hadath, the Spitalfields Great Synagogue. During this time (see History of the Jews in England), the area was home to many Jewish refugees from Russia and Central Europe. From the 1880s through the early part of the 20th century, massive pogroms and the May Laws in Russia caused many Jews to flee the Pale of Settlement. Of the East European Jewish emigrants, 140 000 settled in Britain.

From 1916, the synagogue's leader was the notable Abraham Isaac Kook, later the first Ashkenazi chief rabbi of the British Mandatory Palestine. Nearby was the purpose-built Great Synagogue of London and another church building that had become a Jewish place of worship, the Sandys Row Synagogue. The population of Jews decreased over the years, with many moving to other parts of East London, to North London and elsewhere. The synagogue eventually moved to new premises in Golders Green.

=== Muslim ===
During the 1970s, the area of Spitalfields and Brick Lane was populated mainly by Bangladeshis who had come to Britain from the Sylhet region looking for better work. Many found work in factories and the textile trade. That growing community required a place of worship, and the building at 59 Brick Lane was bought and refurbished. In 1976, it reopened as a mosque, the London Jamme Masjid. Today, the mosque serves the largest concentration of Bangladeshi Muslims in the country (see History of Bangladeshis in the United Kingdom).

The mosque can hold up to 3,200 (including 200 women) and is most crowded during the jummah prayers on Friday. All sermons are delivered in English, Arabic and Bengali. The mosque follows the traditions of Sunni Islam. The mosque has close links with the Bangladesh Welfare Association, which addresses social and community needs. Arabic and mother tongue classes are available for children on the top floors.

The Brick Lane Mosque was once known as the London Great Mosque, but much larger places of worship for Muslims in the capital opened in Regent's Park (the London Central Mosque, 1978) and then nearby Whitechapel Road (the East London Mosque, 1985).

== See also ==
- Islam in the United Kingdom
- Islamic schools and branches
- List of mosques
- List of mosques in the United Kingdom
- Saheb Qiblah Fultali
- Sufism
