= Fournier Street =

Coordinates: 51.5194°N 0.0721°W

Fournier Street, London
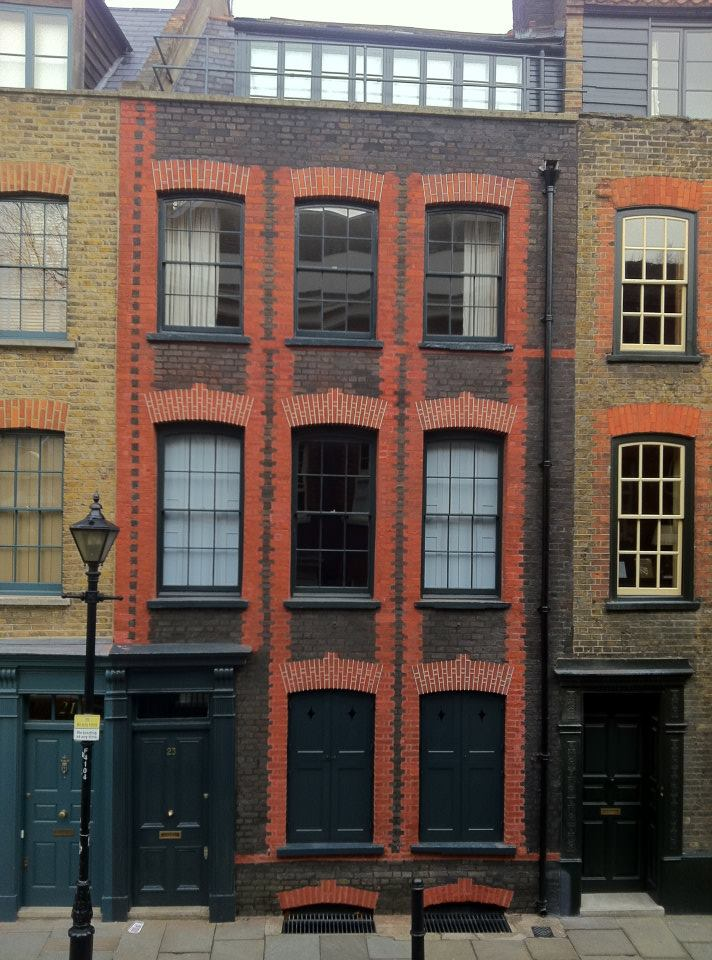
- 23 Fournier Street, a classic Georgian townhouse dating from 1726

- Location within Greater London
- London borough: Tower Hamlets
- Ceremonial county: Greater London
- Region: London
- Country: England
- Sovereign state: United Kingdom
- Post town: LONDON
- Postcode district: E1
- Dialling code: 020
- Police: Metropolitan
- Fire: London
- Ambulance: London
- UK Parliament: Tower Hamlets
- London Assembly: City and East

Fournier Street, formerly Church Street, is a street of 18th-century houses in Spitalfields in the East End of London. It is in the London Borough of Tower Hamlets and runs between Commercial Street and Brick Lane. The street is named after a man of Huguenot extraction, George Fournier.

== History ==
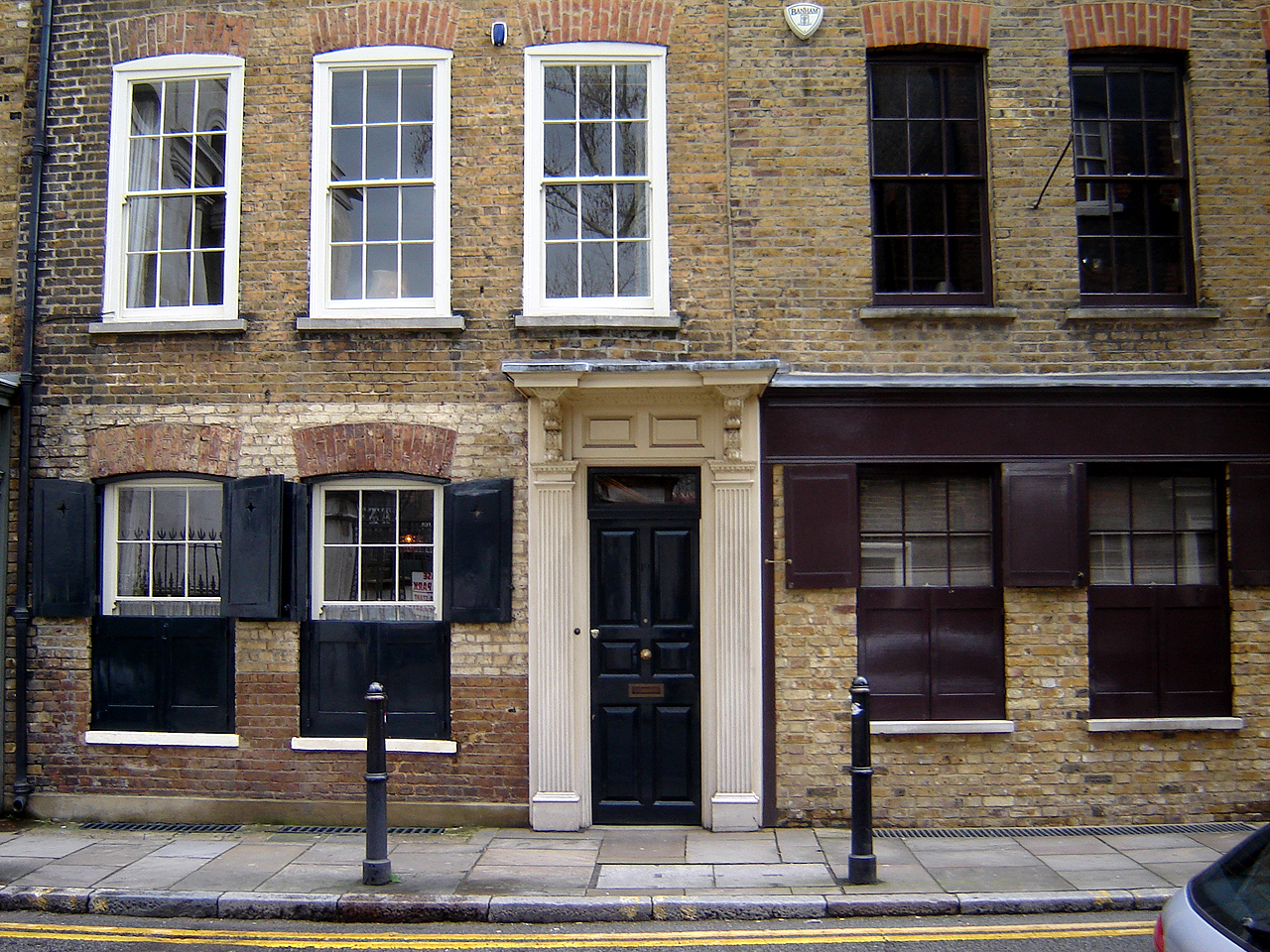
Georgian Townhouses on Fournier Street (February 2007)

Fournier Street was the last to be built on the Wood-Michell estate in Spitalfields, London. It was developed in response to the settlement of a significant community of wealthy French Huguenots around Spitalfields, many of whom brought silk-weaving skills from Nantes, Lyons and other cities. Thus, although initially intended as domestic dwellings, many were immediately occupied by the silk industry. The houses mainly date from the 1720s and together they form one of the most important and best preserved collections of early Georgian domestic town-houses in Britain.

Fournier Street was designed to be both well appointed and of a higher standard than previous residential developments in the local area and consequently the houses were purchased and leased by the 'master' silk-weavers and silk mercers. These buildings are notable for their fine wooden panelling and elaborate joinery such as carved staircases, fireplaces and highly detailed door-cases which were constructed by the craftsmen of the day. Silk-weaving activities occupied the uppermost floors to gain the best light for the looms – hence the development of the unusual highly glazed lofts in these houses. The ground floor rooms commonly served as elaborate showrooms for the finished products.

One example is Howard House, No. 14 Fournier Street, a mansion house, built circa 1726 by "carpenter and gentleman", William Taylor, for his own occupation but subsequently leased by silk weavers, "Signeratt and Bourdillon". It has three floors and a large garret attic which once contained the loom. It is here that the silk for Queen Victoria's Coronation gown was woven. The unique hardwood staircase balustrade is carved to display fluted columns with Ionic capitals placed on each turn for one hundred steps. Indeed, each step is carved with a design of hops, barley, and wild roses.

No. 23 Fournier Street is perhaps the best surviving example of a classic, single-fronted early Georgian town house of simple but elegant design. This house retains the original, typical arrangement of cellar-basement, three brick storeys and a mansard garrett with a weather boarded front and wide weaver's windows.

On the opposite western corner of Fournier Street is the Ten Bells public house. The Ten Bells is notorious for its connection with Jack the Ripper during the 1880s. It is here that two of the Ripper victims were seen close to the times of their deaths. Indeed, all five victims lived in proximity to the pub.

== Religious groups ==
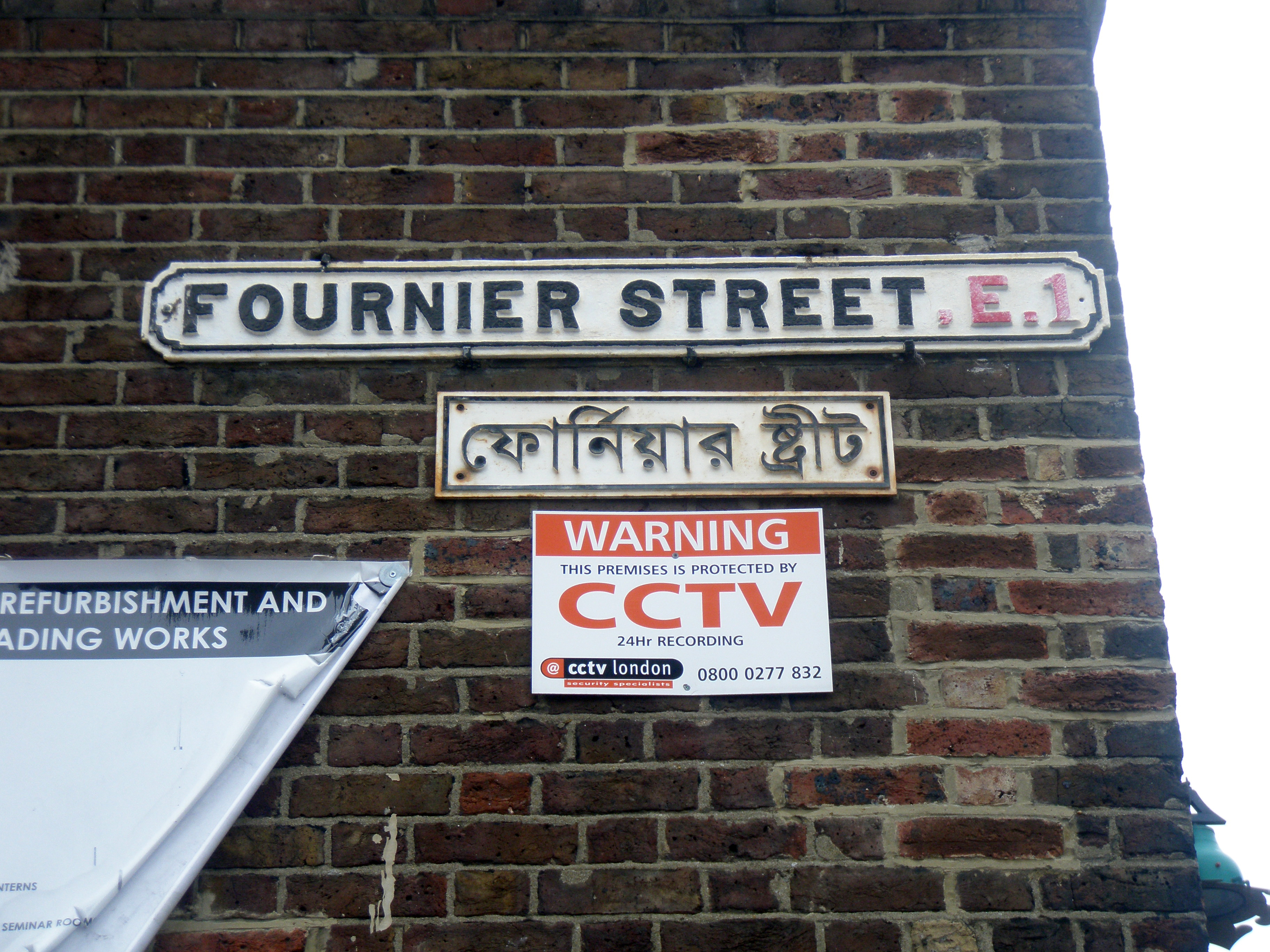
Street signs in English and Bengali

Following the terminal decline of London's silk weaving industry at the end of the Georgian period, both Fournier Street and Brick Lane became established as the heart of the Jewish East End. Although there had been a small Jewish community in the East End for some time, a large number of Jews from Eastern Europe and Russia moved to Spitalfields in the 19th century and founded a thriving community. Many new schools, cultural activities and businesses were created, including the Jews Free School and the Jewish Chronicle newspaper (the oldest Jewish English language weekly in the world).

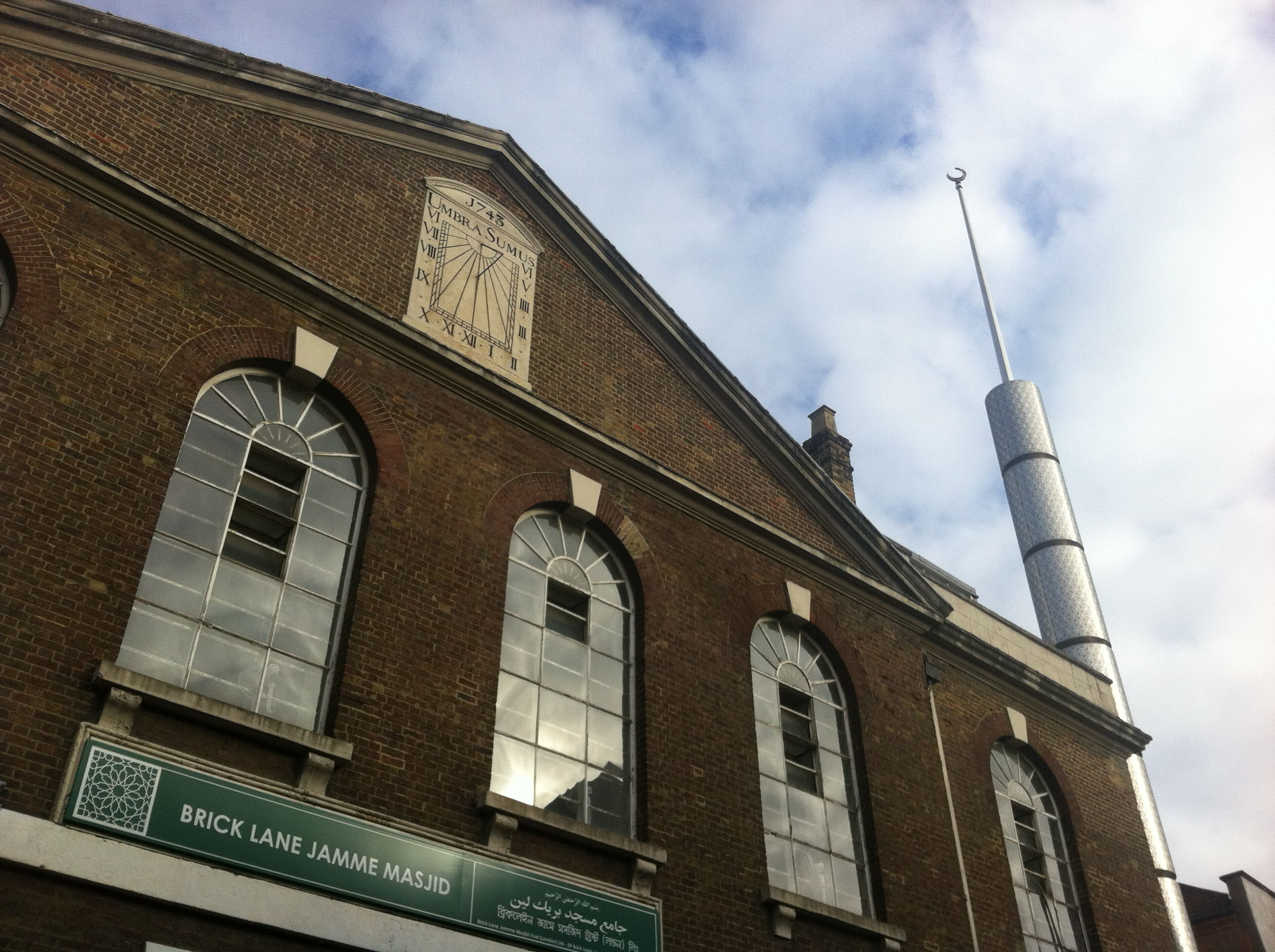
The Jamme Masjid, Eastern Corner

In 1898 the Methodist Church at the eastern extremity of Fournier Street was converted into the Machzike Hadath Synagogue. This building had been constructed as a Huguenot Chapel ('La Neuve Eglise') in 1743–4, had also served as a Protestant church and would later be converted during the 1970s to become the London Jamme Masjid (Great Mosque) as the area then evolved to become the present day heart of the Bengali community. This building's changing use in responding to the changing religious needs of the surrounding population over its 280-year-long history is symbolic of Spitalfields' role in immigration and in providing 'refuge'. Upon a wall on the south side there is still to be seen the large sundial carved with the inscription "Umbra sumus" a quote taken from Horace's odes meaning "We are shadows".

A recent addition to the building is the 29-metre-high, 1.2-metre-wide 'minaret-like structure' erected on the corner of Fournier street and Brick lane in December 2009. This sculpture forms the centrepiece of the Brick Lane Cultural Trail project The lower part of the tower is formed by a number of mounted stainless steel drums covered with a geometric "Flower of Life" pattern. Coloured lighting is concealed within the structure and it is illuminated at night. The uppermost 8 metres are composed of a stainless steel pole topped with an illuminated half crescent moon.

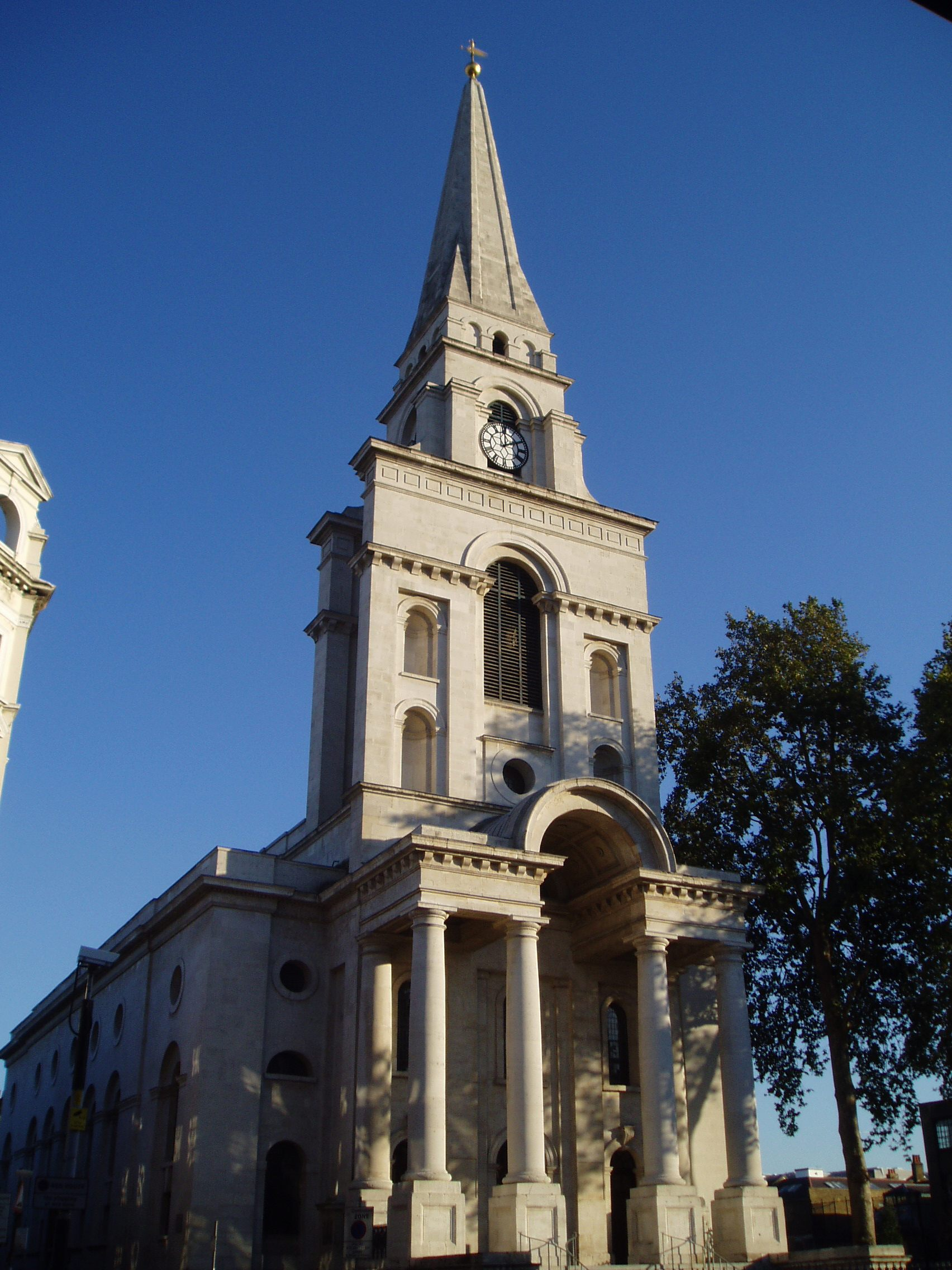
Christ Church, Western Corner

Fournier Street also has the church of Christ Church Spitalfields at its western extremity, designed by Nicholas Hawksmoor, a former assistant of Christopher Wren, and built between 1714 and 1729. This Grade I listed building is widely considered to be the highest expression of English Baroque architecture. The foundations were laid in 1714, and construction of the walls took place over the following years, although the upper stages of the tower and spire were not built until the late 1720s, and the church was finally consecrated on 5 July 1729.

== Present day ==
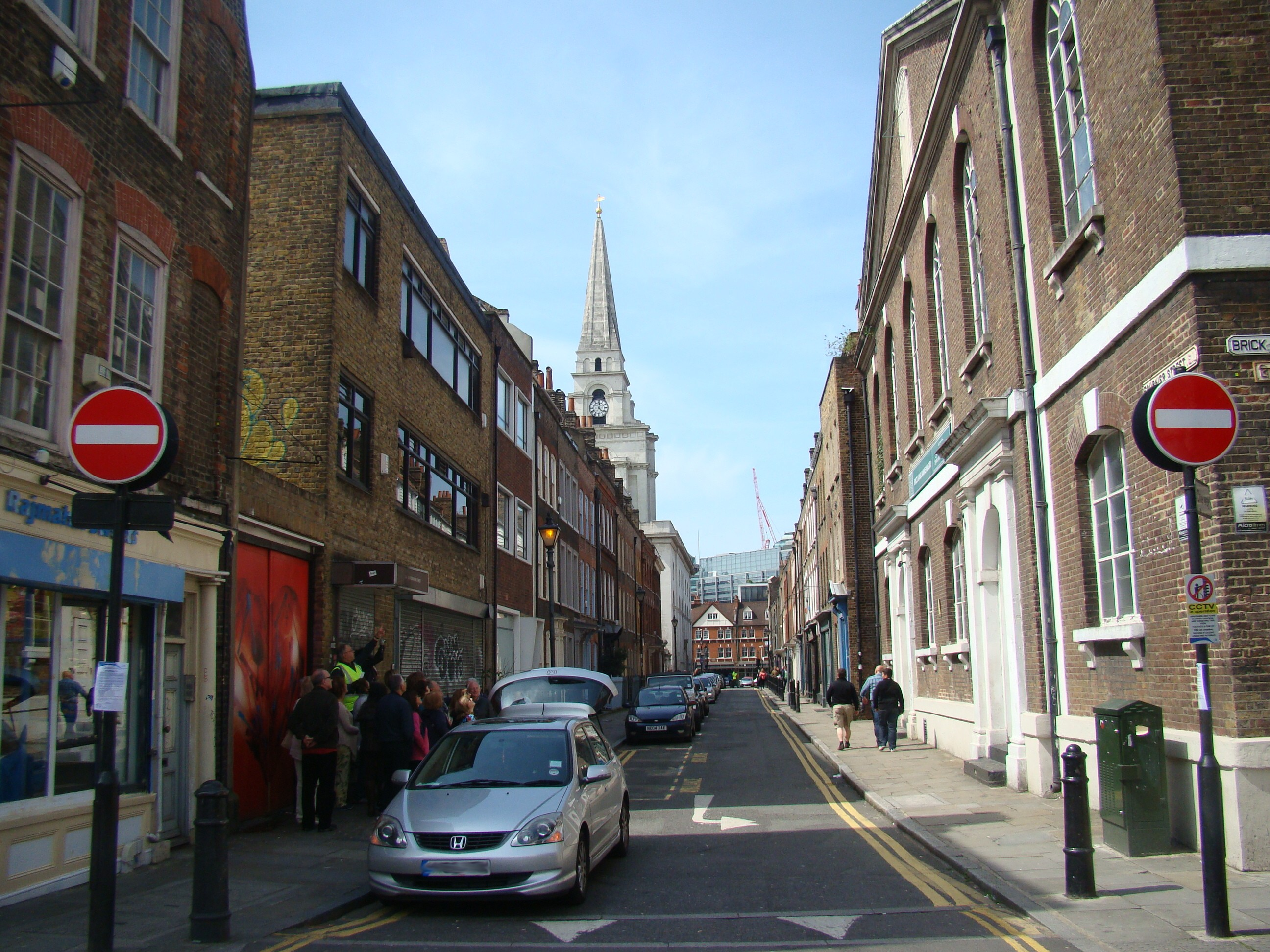
Looking westwards up the street, with the Jamme Masjid on the right and the Christ Church on the left

In current times, perhaps the most famous residents are the artists Gilbert and George, who have lived and worked at their house in Fournier Street for many years. The interior of the building has featured in many of their works, particularly in photographs from the 1970s, which show the building as empty, dilapidated and gloomy.

== Transport ==
The nearest London Underground stations are Liverpool Street and Aldgate East. The nearest London Overground station is Shoreditch High Street station.

== See also ==
- Beigel Bake
- British Bangladeshi
- Brick Lane Market
- Old Truman Brewery – The Black Eagle Brewery on Brick Lane, and into surrounding streets.
- Spitalfield riots
- Spitalfields Festival
- Stepney Historical Trust
- Tracey Emin
