= Unhoused =

Unhoused may refer to:

- the state of homelessness
- Unhoused.org, a non-profit for helping the homeless
