= Spitalfields Crypt Trust =

Charity in London

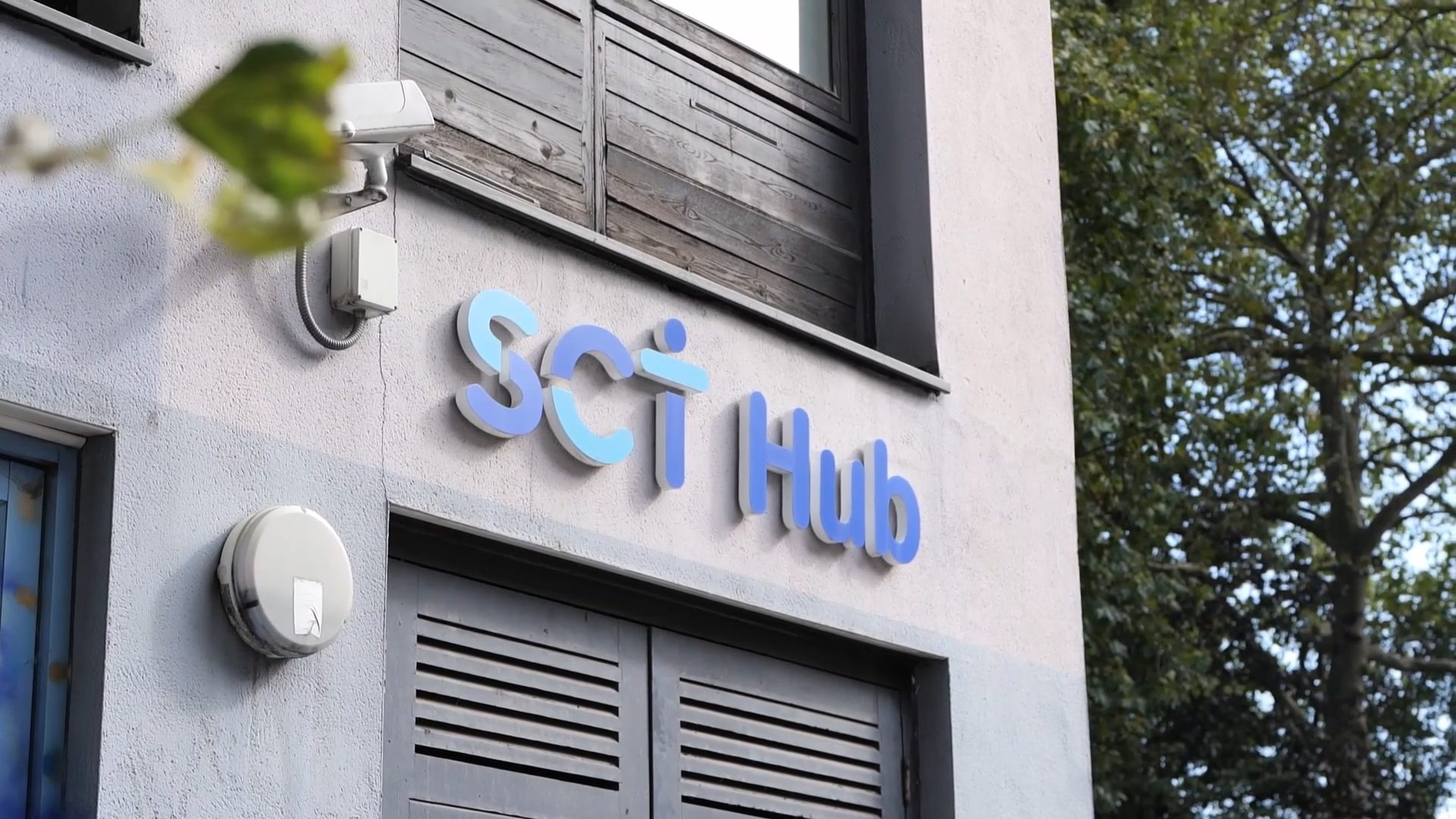
- SCT's hub in Shoreditch
- Abbreviation: SCT
- Formation: 1965
- Founded at: Spitalfields
- Type: Nonprofit
- Headquarters: Shoreditch High Street
- Region served: East London
- Staff: 70
- Website: www.sct.org.uk

Spitalfields Crypt Trust (SCT) is a charity based in Shoreditch, London that supports people in recovery from addictions, homelessness, and other complex needs.

== Operations ==
SCT runs a residential recovery hostel (Acorn House), a training and development centre, and two social enterprises from their hub in Shoreditch. It runs eight charity shops, drop in centres for homeless people, supported housing projects, and a Housing First programme.

SCT's social enterprises include Restoration Station, a furniture restoration and upcycling shop which collaborates with local artists, and Paper and Cup, a coffee shop. The charity has also worked with local designer Ally Capellino to create tote bags from recycled fabric.

It operates in Hackney, Tower Hamlets, and Waltham Forest, employing 70 staff and supporting over 600 people each year.

== History ==
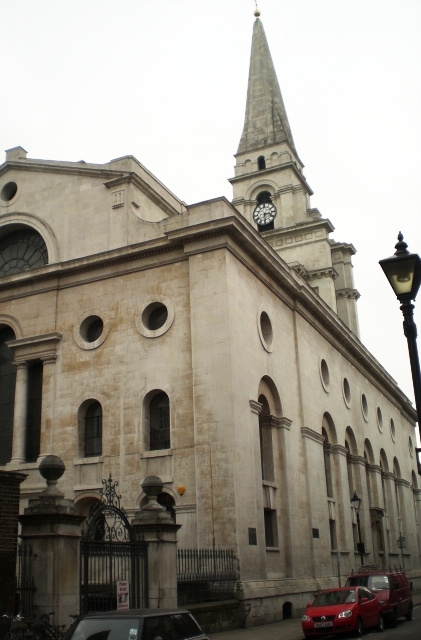
Christ Church, Fournier Street

In the bleak winter of 1965 a homeless man died on the steps of the vicarage of Christ Church, Spitalfields in Fournier Street, leading the vicar, the Rev Eddy Stride to open up its crypt to homeless men in the area as a soup kitchen and night shelter. SCT was founded that November and opened by Princess Alexandra.

In 2000 the charity moved its base to Shoreditch, and continues to support vulnerable people in the local area. The charity has since held 'sleep-out' events on the steps of Christ Church to raise money and awareness.

In September 2017, Prince William visited several of SCT's services in Shoreditch.
