= Unhoused.org =

Social impact organisation

Unhoused.org is a social impact start-up launched in November 2018 based in London, UK. It is a non-profit organisation that focuses on using technology and innovation to alleviate the suffering of the homeless.

== Overview ==
Unhoused aims to solve problems for the homeless through the use of technology. It runs an online shop and enables donations through its buy one, give one model. The organisation also manufactures clothing engineered for people on the street.

== Activities ==
The organisation facilitates donations to the homeless through a project called StreetWear - an online shop that sells winter clothing and supplies. It operates on a One for one (business model) where a matching donation is made to homeless people in London for every purchase made on the platform. Through its website, it sells winter supplies like blankets, jumpers, socks, gloves, etc., intending to donate equivalent, brand new items to make winters on the streets more bearable.

Unhoused.org has also launched self-cleaning hoodies and jumpers designed to repel dirt, liquids, and stains. The start-up has developed its proprietary Freshtech™ nanotechnology, creating a Lotus Effect. Water and liquid beads off the clothes' surface without soaking, which keeps the fabric dry. Aimed at making it more sustainable and low maintenance for rough use on the streets, the clothing is made from 100% polyester, is claimed to dry 40 per cent faster than regular clothing, and doesn't need to be washed for a month. For each such item bought on their online shop, one is donated to the homeless.

In addition to clothing and winter supplies, the website hosts essentials like sanitary kits, haircuts, dental kits, and mobile phone top-ups that can be donated directly to a homeless individual. The platform distributes the items through partner charities like Spitalfields Crypt Trust, The Salvation Army, and Sewa UK. Lack of transparency in donations and potential misuse of cash are issues that make people unwilling to make cash donations. The website enables buyers to track their donations to individual recipients. The charity claimed to have made 1500 donations within the first 3 months of its launch. with more than 100,000 items of clothing distributed till December 2019. Unhoused shares photos and videos of items donated through the website, social media posts, emails and messages from the final recipients of the donations with its customers. This allows customers on the platform to get a sense of the on-ground impact of their donations.

According to its website, the average purchase from the website is around £23 compared to the median donation of £10 that goes for the cause of helping homeless people and housing shelters. The charity aims to develop technology solutions to help the homeless crisis in the UK and expand internationally.

Founded by Varun Bhanot and Anisha Seth, the start-up also plans to set up a digital bank for the homeless with the objective of financial inclusion.

== See also ==
- Homelessness in the United Kingdom
