= Commercial Street, London =

Road in the London Borough of Tower Hamlets

Coordinates: 51°31′8″N 0°4′28″W

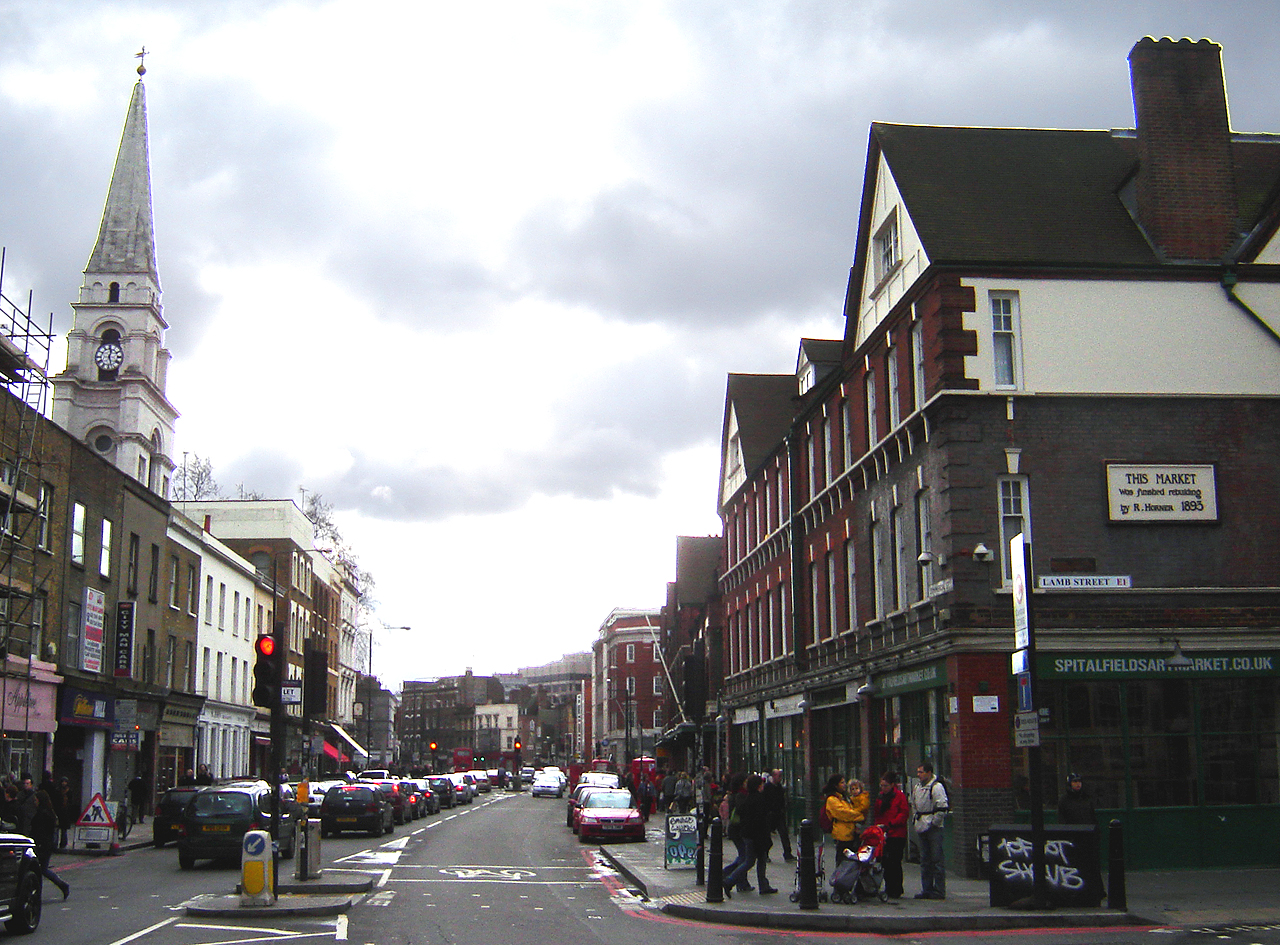
Commercial Street, looking south. The spire of Christ Church is to the left, Spitalfields Market to the right. (February 2007)

Commercial Street is an arterial road in the boroughs of Tower Hamlets and Hackney that runs north to south from Shoreditch High Street to Whitechapel High Street through Spitalfields. The road is a section of the A1202 London Inner Ring Road and as such forms part of the boundary of the London congestion charge zone.

As the name implies, Commercial Street has historically been dominated by industrial and commercial activity in East End, which it maintains to this day. It is on the City of London fringes, and much industry that was seen as too noisome for the City was once exiled to such areas as this. However, since the early 1990s the street has grown increasingly fashionable, while maintaining its busy commercial feel.

== History ==
New Street from Spitalfields to Shoreditch Act 1846
- Act of Parliament
- Parliament of the United Kingdom
- Long title: An Act to enable the Commissioners of Her Majesty's Woods to construct a new Street from Spitalfields to Shoreditch.
- Citation: 9 & 10 Vict. c. 34
- Territorial extent: United Kingdom

Dates
- Royal assent: 27 July 1846
- Commencement: 27 July 1846 (Note: The Acts of Parliament (Commencement) Act 1793.)
Other legislation
Amended by	Spitalfields Improvements Act 1850

Status: Amended

Text of statute as originally enacted

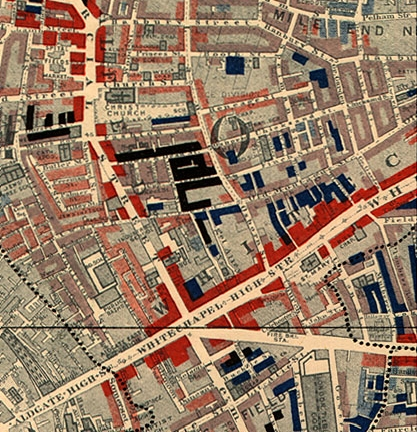
Detail of map of Spitalfields and Whitechapel from Charles Booth's Labour and Life of the People, 1889. Commercial Street can be seen running from near the top left corner to join Whitechapel High Street further south. Residential buildings are coloured to represent the economic class of the occupants, including: red ("Lower middle class – Well-to-do middle class"); pink ("Fairly comfortable good ordinary earnings"); blue ("Intermittent or casual earnings"); and black ("lowest class...occasional labourers, street sellers, loafers, criminals and semi-criminals").

Spitalfields was historically one of the poorest, most overcrowded and most crime-ridden districts in London: a parliamentary report of 1838 described this area as harbouring "an extremely immoral population; women of the lowest character, receivers of stolen goods, thieves and the most atrocious offenders". The southern section of Commercial Street was created in 1843–5 as part of a slum clearance programme, and to connect the Whitechapel thoroughfare with Spitalfields Market. It was laid out by the architect and planner Sir James Pennethorne along the approximate line of former Essex Street, Rose Lane and Red Lion Street, and entailed the demolition of some 250 sub-standard properties in Whitechapel and Spitalfields. The extension north from the market, to the Eastern Counties Railway's Bishopsgate terminus and to Shoreditch High Street, was made between 1849 and 1857 and opened in 1858. In both phases of development there was some initial difficulty in finding tenants for the building plots, and much of the street was not built up until the 1860s and 1870s. Only once Great Eastern Street had been laid out further north between 1872 and 1876, creating a continuation of the route towards Old Street and the City Road, did Commercial Street really begin to succeed as what had always been Pennethorne's aim, an artery allowing traffic to bypass the City of London. With the implementation of the London Congestion Zone in the 2000s, the road has once again seen continued activity from private and commercial vehicles seeking to avoid the 7am–6pm charge, and is a typical arterial route for emergency vehicles.

Until the late twentieth century, the street was heavily dominated by the activities of Spitalfields wholesale fruit and vegetable market, and by outlets for the "rag trade" (the wholesale clothing and textile trade). Since the mid-1970s, however, the area has been increasingly subject to a process of gradual gentrification. In part this reflects the changing character of Spitalfields more generally, but in Commercial Street in particular it was stimulated by the departure of the market in 1991 (and subsequent redevelopment of its buildings), the arrival of a number of private residential developments (especially at the northern end of the street), and the introduction of some modest traffic-calming measures. Many of the commercial units in the street are now occupied by fashionable clothing shops or restaurants.

== Topography and architecture ==
The street's most significant features are Hawksmoor's grand Christ Church, on the corner of Fournier Street; and (almost opposite) Spitalfields Market, the old fruit and vegetable market that is now bustling again after a long period of uncertainty. Both the market buildings and Christ Church are lucky survivors, as demolition has loomed for both of them at one point or another.

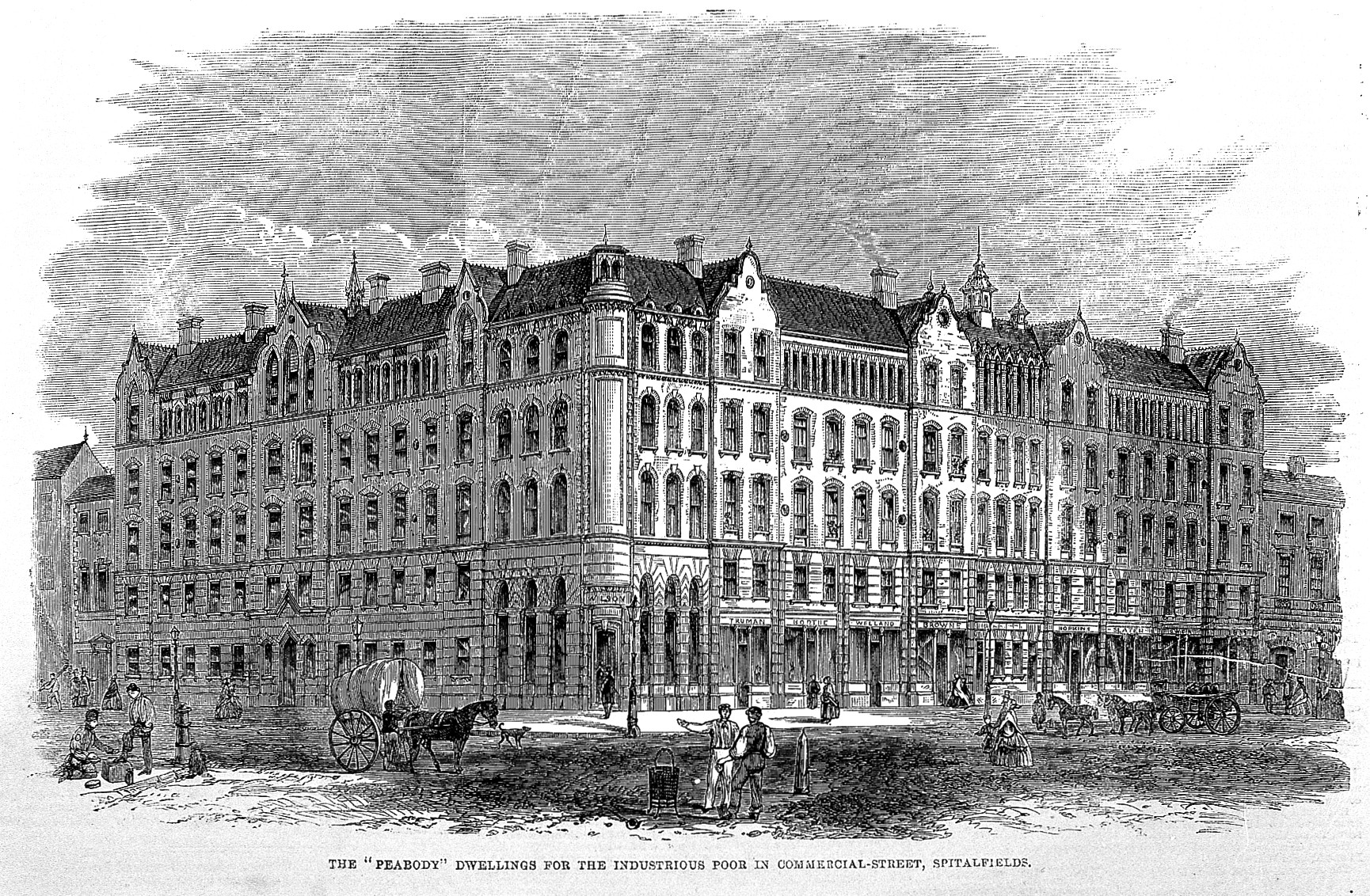
The Peabody dwellings in Commercial Street: a wood-engraving published in the Illustrated London News in 1863, shortly before the building opened.

The northern end of the street is dominated on its eastern side by the sprawling Exchange Building, an Art Deco former tobacco works, now residential. On the western side stands the former Commercial Street Police Station (built 1874–75, with an extra storey added in 1906), also now a residential block named Burhan Uddin House. Just to its south, with a wing extending into Folgate Street, is the first tenement block of model dwellings to be erected by the Peabody Donation Fund (now the Peabody Trust) for London's "industrious poor". The red-brick Jacobethan block was designed by H. A. Darbishire and opened in 1864, but was sold by the Trust in the late 1970s and is now a private residential block named The Cloisters.

On the opposite corner of Fournier Street from Christ Church is the Ten Bells, a pub that is popularly associated with Jack the Ripper, as two of his female prostitute victims are supposed to have frequented the establishment. Many Ripper tours (a thriving trade) start out nearby. Although the pub has long been refurbished, it still retains some fine original tilework. Prostitution remained a feature of Commercial Street until recently. Dorset Street, which ran off Commercial Street to the west immediately south of Spitalfields Market, was dubbed the "worst street in London".

Much of the southern section of the street is occupied by warehouse buildings of the 1860s. Wentworth Street (part of the busy Petticoat Lane Market) runs off Commercial Street to the west. Immediately to the south of Wentworth Street lies the Holland Estate, a social housing estate with elements dating back to the 1920s, but which is dominated on its Commercial Street frontage by blocks of the late 1960s and early 1970s, including a 22-storey tower block, Denning Point. The estate is now managed by Eastend Homes, and in 2012 was undergoing a major programme of regeneration that would see the demolition and replacement of several of the blocks. To the south again is the 11-storey Ibis London City budget hotel (opened 2005), and beyond that, at the junction with Whitechapel High Street, the Relay Building, a 21-storey residential development (completed 2014). On the eastern side of Commercial Street stands Toynbee Hall, the university settlement founded in 1884.

== Nearby stations ==
The nearest London Underground station is Aldgate East, at Commercial Street's southern end. Shoreditch High Street London Overground station is close to the northern end, by the former Bishopsgate Goods Yard. London Liverpool Street is a National Rail and London Underground interchange, a short walk to the west.
