= Spitalfields Music =

English music festival

- Frequency: once annually
- Location: Spitalfields
- Inaugurated: 1976
- Website: spitalfieldsmusic.org.uk

Spitalfields Music (previously known as Spitalfields Festival, officially registered as Spitalfields Festival Limited) is a music charity based in the Bethnal Green area of the London Borough of Tower Hamlets. Through musical events, the charity aims to bring different artists together in a creative space in London.

The charity's work mainly consists of producing music festivals and a community programme. Several new works are commissioned each year for the festival.

== History ==
In 1976, Spitalfields Festival was created when an event, organised by Save Britain's Heritage, was held at Christ Church in Spitalfields in the summer.

In the Summer of 1977, the first official festival occurred. It was run by Friends of Christ Church, which had been formed the previous year after the single event had been held.

The Festival Council and the Learning and Participation Programme were formed in 1989.

A winter festival was expanded to starting 1996.

In 2003, Christ Church was being renovated, so the festival was spread into 13 other venues.

Spitalfeilds Music won Royal Philharmonic Society Music Awards in both 2005 and 2006

In 2020, the festival was postponed due to the coronavirus pandemic.

== Learning and Participation Programme ==
Since the founding of the education programme in 1989, the work that Spitalfields Music does with the community of Tower Hamlets has grown considerably. Alongside its Learning and Participation Programme, Spitalfields Music also runs a number of schemes to develop artists and music leaders of the future, including Trainee Music Leaders Scheme and Open Call.

=== Trainee Music Leaders Scheme ===
This is a year-long training programme for emerging music leaders to develop their skills as creative music leaders in learning and community settings, working with national partners including: Welsh National Opera, LSO Discovery, Opera North, Orchestras Live, Multi Story Orchestra and Southbank Sinfonia.

== Funding ==
Spitalfields Music receives financial support from trusts, foundations, corporate giving, public funding and individual giving. They also earn income from ticket sales from their festivals.
