= Spitalfield riots =

18th-century riots in London, England

The Spitalfield riots occurred between 1765 and 1769, during a downturn in the silk weaving industry, centred on Spitalfields, London. The weavers organised to attempt to ensure that the rates of pay paid for their piece work was not cut beneath the level at which they could feed themselves, and their families. As a result of these demonstrations, the government banned the importation of French woven silks and instituted a minimum wage in the Spitalfields trade.

== Origins ==
Spitalfields had been a centre of the silk-weaving industry since the early seventeenth century. Towards the end of the century, at the time when the Huguenots arrived from France, large numbers of Huguenot silk-weavers settled in the district. During the 1760s, there were still many weavers in Spitalfields whose French surnames showed their Huguenot descent. Irish weavers came slightly later, but by the middle of the 1730s there were many people from Ireland, or of Irish origins, working in the Spitalfields silk industry.

Relations between the groups were not always good. There were times when the Irish weavers were blamed for working for too little money and bringing down the rates of pay. The conflict of 1769 cut right through the middle of both communities, the Huguenots and the Irish. Journeymen were involved in a struggle to keep the rates that the master weavers paid for their work from falling below a subsistence level. They organised in unofficial, and highly illegal, trade unions. "Silk-cutting", slashing up a weaver's work, was used as a punishment for weavers who accepted a lower rate of pay, or master weavers who refused to pay money into the funds that were collected to support union activities.

Riots among the Spitalfields weavers were common. Any decline of prices, or opposition in trade, would lead to violence. There was a slump following the Seven Years' War and increased unemployment in the silk trade, leading silk weavers to demand restrictions on the import of French woven silk. In 1765, when the George III attended parliament to give assent to the Regency Act, the weavers formed a procession of red flags and black banners to protest the importation of French silks. There was considerable sympathy with the weavers and the king decided to wear no foreign silks. The House of Lords were terrified into an adjournment, and in the evening, Bedford Estate was attacked, the mob claiming that the Duke of Bedford had been bribed into making the Treaty of Fontainebleau allowing importation from France. However, it is said that despite the large size of the demonstrations there was little violence and certainly far less than in the Gordon Riots, that the journeymen weavers were among the most highly skilled and literate of the working population and that, with some exceptions, they felt that their interests were not at variance with those of their employers.

An Act was passed in 1765, making it a felony punishable by death to break into any house, or shop, with the intent to maliciously destroy, or damage, any silk in the process of manufacture. The "cutters" continued rioting in 1767, 1768 and again in 1769; attacking workshops and wounding any who stood in their way. From 1766 until 1826 there was total prohibition on the import of French woven silks into Britain. From 1773 wages were controlled by legislation that came to be known as The Spitalfields Acts, effectively instituting minimum wages in the industry in the Spitalfields area (although not in other silk-weaving districts). This legislation and the prohibition of French imports remained in place until 1824 when they were repealed as part of the movement towards free trade.

== Spitalfield riots ==
In September 1769, an attempt was made to arrest an entire meeting of weavers. An officer with a party of soldiers invested a pub, the "Dolphin", in Spitalfields, "where a number of riotous weavers, commonly called cutters, were assembled to collect contributions from their brethren towards supporting themselves in order to distress their masters and oblige them to advance their wages". Meeting with resistance, the soldiers fired on the weavers and killed two, and captured four. The remainder fled and lay concealed in cellars of houses and in the vaults of the churches throughout the night of terror not only for them but also for their womenfolk.

=== Trials ===
John Doyle, who had an Irish surname, and John Valline, of French origin, were arrested for being involved. They were convicted on the evidence of two Irish weavers, Thomas and Mary Poor, who also gave evidence in the trial of William Horsford, an Irish weaver. At the latter trial, it emerged that a master weaver, Lewis Chauvet (Huguenot), had paid money for them to give evidence at both trials and that the same master had paid money for Daniel Clarke to inform against William Eastman. Horsford and Eastman were also executed.

=== Execution ===
On 6 December 1769, the two men were hanged in nearby Bethnal Green, in front of the "Salmon and Ball" pub, which still exists.

A newspaper reporter recorded the words that John Doyle spoke to the crowd, as he stood on the hangman's ladder with the rope round his neck: "I John Doyle do hereby declare, as my last dying words in the presence of my Almighty God, that I am as innocent of the fact I am now to die for as the child unborn. Let my blood lie to that wicked man who has purchased it with gold, and them notorious wretches who swore it falsely away." Doyle's companion, Valline, also swore his innocence of the crime for which the two of them were hanged.
