= Gilbert & George =

British artist duo

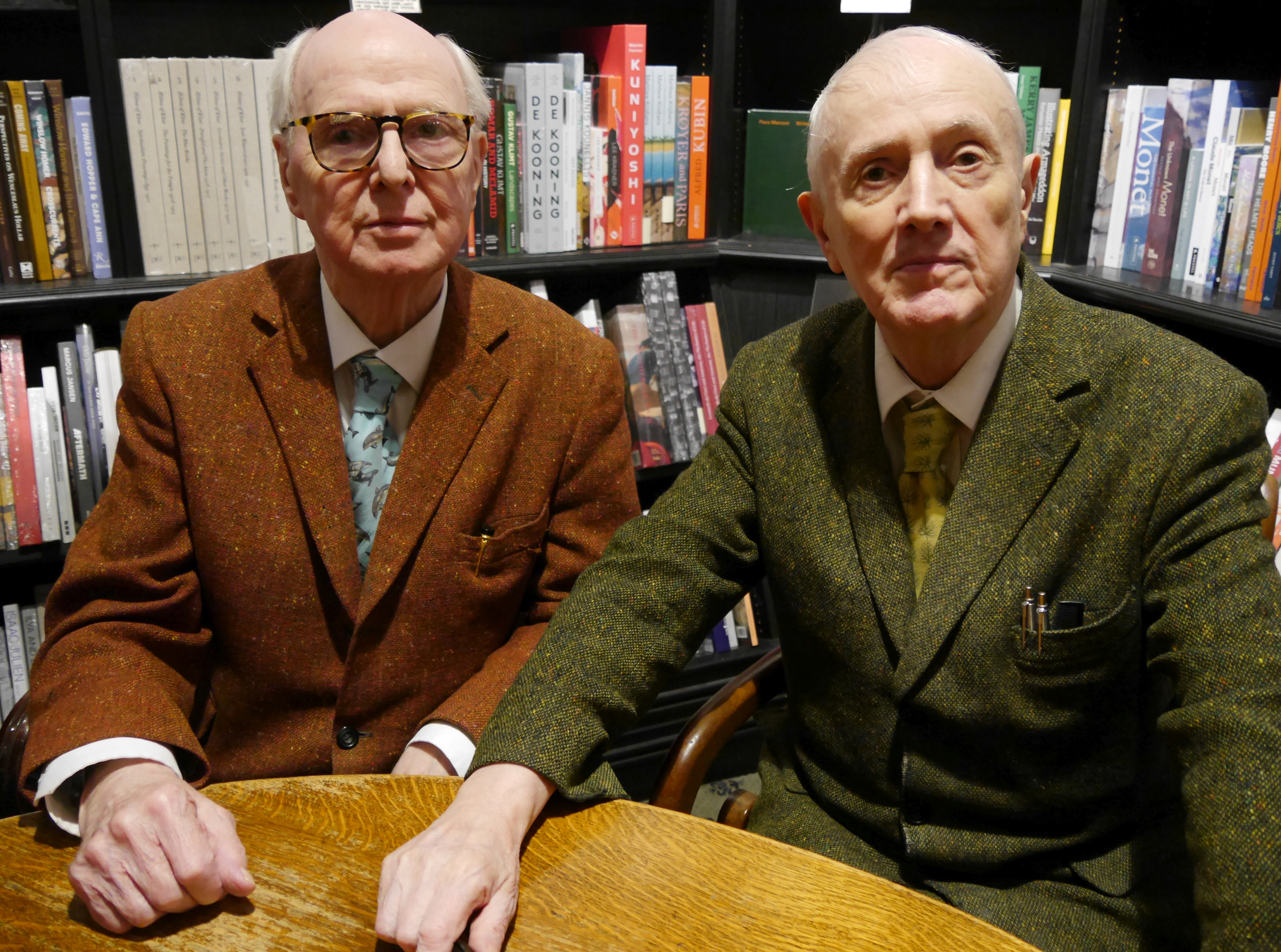
- George (left) and Gilbert (right) in 2023
- Education: Saint Martin's School of Art
- Occupation: Visual artists
- Awards: Regione Lazio Award (Torino, 1981); Turner Prize (1986); Special International Award (Los Angeles, 1989); South Bank Award (2007); Lorenzo il Magnifico Award (Florence, 2007)
- Gilbert Prousch
- Born: 17 September 1943 (age 83); San Martin de Tor, Italy
- George Passmore
- Born: 8 January 1942 (age 84); Plymouth, England

Gilbert Prousch, sometimes referred to as Gilbert Proesch (born 17 September 1943), and George Passmore (born 8 January 1942) are artists who work together as the collaborative art duo Gilbert & George. They are known for their formal appearance and manner in performance art, and for their brightly coloured graphic-style photo-based artworks. In 2017 the pair celebrated their 50th anniversary as collaborators. In April 2023 Gilbert & George opened the Gilbert & George Centre in Heneage Street, London E1, to showcase their work in regular exhibitions.

== Early lives ==
Gilbert Prousch was born in San Martin de Tor in South Tyrol, northern Italy, his native language being Ladin. He studied art at the Sëlva School of Art in Val Gardena and Hallein School of Art in Austria and the Kunstakademie Munich, before moving to England.

George Passmore was born in Plymouth in the United Kingdom, to a single mother in a low-income household. He dropped out of regular school by the time he was fifteen years old and studied art at Dartington College of Arts and then Oxford School of Art.

The two first met on 25 September 1967 while studying sculpture at Saint Martin's School of Art. The two claim they came together because George was the only person who could understand Gilbert's rather poor English. In a 2002 interview with The Daily Telegraph, they said of their meeting: "it was love at first sight". They married secretly in 2008. Their perspectives on marriage have changed overtime. In 2009, Gibert & George had 2 separate interviews about marriage. On June 24th, In regard to marriage, George & Gilbert stated “to live in sin, We want to be weird normal. We don't want to be informed as everyone else is, because then we wouldn't have something to say.” However, in the other interview, on July 5th, the duo stated, "We got married last year at Bow register office. We thought it was probably about time." They are often seen together on walks through East London.

Since 1968, Gilbert & George have been residents of Fournier Street, Spitalfields, East London. They live in an 18th-century house that has been restored to its original decor. Their entire body of work has been created in, and focused on, London's East End, which they see as a microcosm. According to George, "Nothing happens in the world that doesn't happen in the East End."

== Work ==
Art Historian, Gregory Salter states that: “the art of Gilbert and George in the 1970s in relation to the concept of the threshold. The threshold is used as a means of addressing the shifting, and potentially disintegrating, boundaries of space, politics, morality, and society that are represented, with reckless ambiguity, in Gilbert and George’s pictures.”

The duo choose a theme out of "death, hope, life, fear, sex, money, race and religion, and all of the subjects that surround those fields".

Gilbert and George claim that their approach to art has always been anti-elitist. Adopting the slogan 'Art for All', they aimed to be relevant beyond the narrow confines of the art world. Although they work in a variety of media, they have always referred to all of their works as "sculpture".

One of their first notable works of art, created in 1969, was a photographic self-portrait of them wearing their trademark suits. George the Cunt and Gilbert the Shit was so titled to forestall criticism.

Between 1970 and 1974 they made drawings (referred to as 'Charcoal on Paper Sculptures') and paintings to give a more tangible form to their identity as 'living sculptures'.

=== Singing and living sculptures ===
Whilst still students, Gilbert & George made The Singing Sculpture, which was performed at the National Jazz and Blues Festival in 1969 and at the Nigel Greenwood Gallery in 1970. For this performance they covered their heads and hands in multi-coloured metalised powders, stood on a table, and sang along and moved to a recording of Flanagan and Allen's song "Underneath the Arches", sometimes for a day at a time.

In August 1969 the pair gatecrashed the private view of the London staging of When Attitudes Become Form at the Institute of Contemporary Arts, for which they had not been selected to exhibit, appearing as living sculptures among the guests. The Dutch art historian Carel Blotkamp, who was present, later recalled that "people were not amused. Critics and gallery owners thought it was rubbish, until a few months later when they thought it was art". The suits they wore for this performance became a uniform for them. They rarely appear in public without wearing them.

It is also unusual for one of the pair to be seen without the other. The pair regard themselves as "living sculptures". They refuse to dissociate their art from their everyday lives, insisting that everything they do is art. They were listed as among the fifty best-dressed over-50s by The Guardian in March 2013.

=== The Pictures ===
G and G (1973) at the National Gallery of Art in 2022

The pair are known for their large scale photo works, known as The Pictures. The early work in this style is in black and white, later with hand-painted red and yellow touches. They proceeded to use a range of bolder colours, sometimes backlit, and overlaid with black grids. Their work has addressed a wide variety of subject matter including religion and patriotism. The two artists also often appear in their own "pictures". They have described their "pictures" as a sort of "visual love letter from us to the viewer".

In 1986, Gilbert & George were criticised for a series of pictures seemingly glamourising 'rough types' of London's East End such as skinheads, while a picture of an Asian man bore the title "Paki". Some of their work has attracted media attention because of the inclusion of (potentially) shocking imagery, such as nudity, depictions of sexual acts, and bodily fluids (faeces, urine and semen). The titles of these works, such as Naked Shit Pictures (1994) and Sonofagod Pictures (2005), also contributed to the attention.

The pair starred in a documentary series, The Fundamental Gilbert and George, in 1997 for London Weekend Television (LWT). It went on to win the BAFTA Award for the best documentary series. A book, The Complete Pictures, 1971–2005, published in 2007 by Tate Modern, includes over a thousand examples of their art.

In May 2007, Gilbert & George were the subject of the BBC documentary Imagine, presented by Alan Yentob. At the end of the programme a picture entitled 'Planed' was made available as a free file download from the BBC and The Guardian websites for 48 hours. People who downloaded the files could then print and assemble the piece, and thus own an original Gilbert and George picture for free.

=== Jack Freak Pictures ===
Jack Freak Pictures is, to date, the largest series of work created by Gilbert & George. According to Michael Bracewell "the Jack Freak Pictures are among the most iconic, philosophically astute and visually violent works that Gilbert & George have ever created." The Union Jack and Gilbert & George are the two dominant pictorial images – appearing contorted, abstracted, and sometimes complete. The entire series is set in the East End of London indicated by flags, maps, street signs, graffiti and other less obvious motifs such as brickwork and foliage that can be found there.

After showing at White Cube's Hoxton and Mason Yard galleries in 2009 the exhibition travelled to the Croatian Museum of Contemporary Art, Zagreb; The Kröller-Müller Museum, the Netherlands; Centro de Arte Contemporaneo de Malaga, Spain; Arndt & Partner gallery, Berlin; the Baronian Francey Gallery, Brussels; and the Bozar Center for Fine Arts, Brussels.

=== Later work ===
In 2019, Gilbert & George held their first solo exhibition in Asia at Lehmann Maupin, Hong Kong, presenting the series THE BEARD PICTURES.

During lockdown amid the COVID-19 pandemic, Gilbert & George started an online video diary, posting weekly updates on life in their newly limited circumstances. The bulletins, often short films, were a continuation of their usual creative habit of documenting social change.

== Awards and honours ==
Gilbert & George have received acclaim with extensive solo exhibitions in the UK, USA, France, the Netherlands, Switzerland, Germany, Spain, Austria, Denmark, Finland, Russia and China; numerous Honorary Doctorates from academic institutions including Plymouth University; and awards such as the Special International Award, the South Bank Award and the Lorenzo il Magnifico Award. In 1986 they won the Turner Prize which is widely considered to be the UK's most prestigious contemporary art award. In 2005 they represented the UK at the 51st Venice Biennale.

In 2017, Gilbert & George were elected to the Royal Academy of Arts; in 2020, however, they resigned from the academy in reaction to a decision not to go ahead with an exhibition they had been planning to stage in its galleries.

Notable honours include:

- 1981 – won the Regione Lazio Award (Torino)
- 1986 – won the Turner Prize
- 1989 – won the Special International Award (Los Angeles)
- 2005 – represented the UK at the Venice Biennale
- 2007 – their retrospective at Tate Modern was the largest of any of the artists who have had retrospectives there
- 2007 – won the South Bank Award, as well as the Lorenzo il Magnifico Award (Florence).
- December 2008 – awarded Honorary Doctorates by London Metropolitan University.
- October 2010 – awarded the honorary title "Magister Artium Gandensis" by University College Ghent
- November 2010 – conferred with Honorary Doctorates by the University of East London
- March 2012 – conferred with Honorary Doctorates by the Open University
- 2013 – awarded Honorary Doctorates of Arts by Plymouth University
- 2017 – elected as Royal Academicians by the Royal Academy of Arts in London, resigned in 2020

== Political stance ==
Gilbert & George claim to be an oddity in the artistic world because of their openly conservative political views and their praise for Margaret Thatcher. George claims never to have been anti-establishment: "You're not allowed to be Conservative in the art world, of course," he says. "Left equals good. Art equals Left. Pop stars and artists are meant to be so original. So how come everyone has the same opinion? ... We admire Margaret Thatcher greatly. She did a lot for art. Socialism wants everyone to be equal. We want to be different." Both are supportive of Brexit and the Conservative Party. The duo are monarchists and have said of the King, at the time Prince of Wales: "We're also fond of the Prince of Wales: he's a gentleman." In a Guardian interview, they said that they opposed the removal of statues after the George Floyd protests, saying “Leave them as they are, because they’re part of the city. You don’t go to Rome and take down all the Roman sculptures. You don’t destroy all the heads of Caesar – although he must have done very bad things.”

== Influence and legacy ==
Gilbert & George inspired two characters, Man Green and Man Yellow, Chief Constables of the Science Gestapo, in Grant Morrison's comicbook series The Filth. The two characters appear in pastiches of Gilbert & George's artwork, with the separate sections of the imagery acting as individual comic book panels. They also inspired the parody "Egbert & Bill", performance artist characters in the sketch comedy The All New Alexei Sayle Show, portrayed by Alexei Sayle and John Sparkes. The look that electronic music band Kraftwerk adopted between 1974 and 1978, with men in suits wearing ties, was partly inspired by Gilbert & George: musicians Florian Schneider and Ralf Hütter had seen an exhibition of the artists in Düsseldorf in 1970 and were inspired by the idea of "bringing art into everyday life". Vic Reeves has explained to The Independent that Vic Reeves Big Night Out was initially thought of as "performance art, like Gilbert and George's singing sculpture". David Bowie was a collector of the artists' work.

=== The Gilbert & George Centre ===
On 1 April 2023, the Gilbert & George Centre was inaugurated on Heneage Street (near Aldgate East tube station). It features three gallery spaces in a building redesigned in 2017 by SIRS Architects with sustainability in mind. When speaking to Tabish Khan, writing for Artsy, a spokesperson for the centre stated: “After the deaths of Gilbert & George, it is intended that the properties in Fournier Street occupied by them, which contain their archives will become a place of scholarship and research into the art of Gilbert & George".

The gate of the centre was custom made and features the letters "G & G". It is painted in "invisible green".

== See also ==
Bob & Bob
