= Spitalfields =

Area in East London

Coordinates: 51.5166°N 0.0750°W

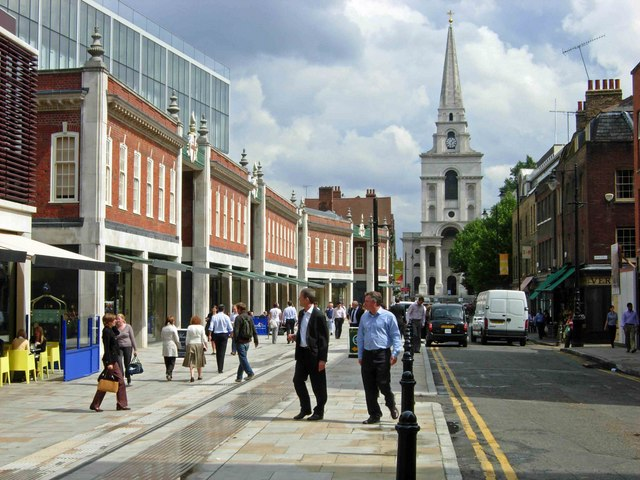
- Brushfield Street, looking towards Christ Church and Brick Lane

- Location within Greater London
- Population: 14,166 (2021 Census. Spitalfields and Banglatown Ward)
- OS grid reference: TQ335815
- London borough: Tower Hamlets
- Ceremonial county: Greater London
- Region: London
- Country: England
- Sovereign state: United Kingdom
- Post town: LONDON
- Postcode district: E1
- Dialling code: 020
- Police: Metropolitan
- Fire: London
- Ambulance: London
- UK Parliament: Bethnal Green and Stepney
- London Assembly: City and East

Spitalfields (/ˈspɪtəlfiːldz/) is an area in London, England, and is located in the London Borough of Tower Hamlets. It is in East London and situated in the East End. Spitalfields is formed around Commercial Street and Brick Lane. It has several markets, including Spitalfields Market, the historic Old Spitalfields Market, Brick Lane Market and Petticoat Lane Market.

The area has long attracted migrants from overseas. In the 19th century this included many Jews, whose presence gained for the area at that time the nickname of Little Jerusalem. Since the second half of the 20th century it has been home to a large Bangladeshi community.

Spitalfields lies just outside the City of London; it was a hamlet (autonomous area) of the large ancient parish of Stepney in Middlesex, and became an independent parish in 1729. It formed part of the County of London from 1889 and was part of the Metropolitan Borough of Stepney from 1900. It was abolished as a civil parish in 1921.

== Origin and administration ==
=== Toponymy ===
The name Spitalfields appears in the form Spittellond in 1399; as The spitel Fyeld on the "Woodcut" map of London of c. 1561; and as Spyttlefeildes, also in 1561. The land belonged to St Mary Spital, a priory or hospital (a lodging for travellers run by a religious order) erected on the east side of the Bishopsgate thoroughfare in 1197, from which its name is thought to derive ("spital" being a corruption of the word "hospital".) An alternative, and possibly earlier, name for the area was Lolsworth.

=== Administrative history ===
The area was a part of the manor and ancient parish of Stepney before the Domesday Book of 1086.

Parish areas originally had only ecclesiastical (church) functions. The monasteries which had provided extensive charitable work on a voluntary basis, were dissolved by Henry VIII, creating increased hardship. The government responded by making parish areas take on civil functions, primarily a new Poor Law intended to fill the gap left by monasteries.

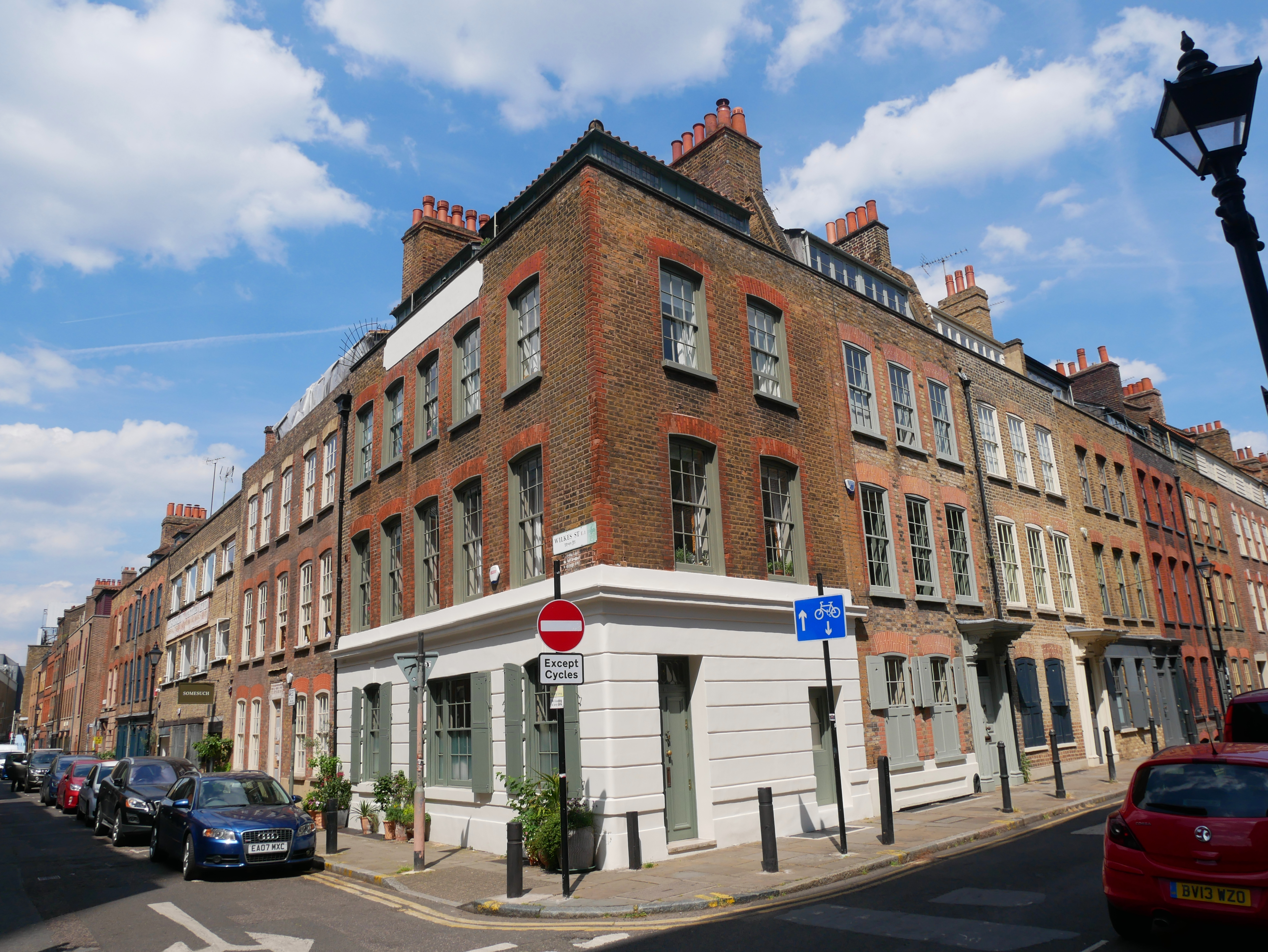
The 18th-century house at 15 Fournier Street, a Grade II listed structure in Spitalfields

Stepney was a very large and populous parish, and by the late 17th century it had devolved its civil parish functions to autonomous areas called Hamlets, in this context meaning territorial sub-divisions, rather than small villages, of which Spitalfields was one.

In 1729, the Hamlet of Spitalfields became an independent daughter parish. The area's parish church was Christ Church, Spitalfields, with St Stephen Spitalfields, demolished in 1930, added later.

In 1855, the parish became part of the Whitechapel District within the Metropolitan Board of Works area. Spitalfields Vestry nominated twelve members to the Whitechapel District Board of Works. The Board of Works was an unelected body, responsible for certain infrastructure functions.

Spitalfields became part of the Metropolitan Borough of Stepney in 1900, and on 1 April 1921 the civil parish was abolished and merged with Whitechapel. At the 1911 census, one of the last before the abolition of the parish, Spitalfields had a population of 19,811. It became part of the London Borough of Tower Hamlets in 1965.

The area was part of the historic (or ancient) county of Middlesex, but military and most (or all) civil county functions were managed more locally, by the Tower Division (also known as the Tower Hamlets), a historic ‘county within a county’, under the leadership of the Lord-Lieutenant of the Tower Hamlets (the post was always filled by the Constable of the Tower of London). The military loyalty to the Tower meant local men served in the Tower garrison and Tower Hamlets Militia, rather than the Middlesex Militia.

The role of the Tower Division ended when Spitalfields became part of the new County of London in 1889. The County of London was replaced by Greater London in 1965.

=== Representation ===
Nearly all, except a tiny area north of the railway, in Weaver's Ward, of the district is part of the Spitalfields & Banglatown ward, which elects two councillors to Tower Hamlets Borough Council. Spitalfields is in the Bethnal Green and Stepney constituency, with the area represented in the House of Commons of the UK Parliament since 2010 by Rushanara Ali of the Labour Party.

The Spitalfields Neighbourhood Planning Forum, which is constituted of Spitalfields residents, business operators, community organisations and other local interests, is intended to help local people influence neighbourhood planning policies.

== History ==
=== Roman era ===
The Romans had a cemetery to the east of the Bishopsgate thoroughfare, which roughly follows the line of Ermine Street: the main highway to the north from Londinium. The cemetery was noticed by the antiquarian John Stow in 1576 and was the focus of a major archaeological excavation in the 1990s, following the redevelopment of Spitalfields Market.

In 2013, Janet Montgomery of Durham University undertook lead isotope analysis of tooth enamel, identifying the first person from Rome known to have been buried in Britain. She was a 25-year-old woman, buried in a lead-lined stone sarcophagus around the middle of the 4th century AD, and accompanied by grave goods of jet and glass.

=== St Mary Spital ===
Coat of arms attributed to Walter Brunus (or Brown), the founder of the priory in 1197

In 1197, a priory, The New Hospital of St Mary without Bishopsgate, latterly known as St Mary Spital, was founded by Walter Brunus and his wife Roisia, and built on the site of the cemetery. It was one of the biggest hospitals in medieval England and had a large cemetery with a mortuary chapel and stone charnel house. The chapel has been uncovered by archaeologists and preserved for public viewing. The priory and hospital were dissolved in 1539 under Henry VIII. At the time of the dissolution, the hospital had beds for 180 sick poor.

The inner precinct of priory hospital was adjacent to the area that later became the Hamlet and parish of Spitalfields, in the tiny extra-parochial area called the Liberty of Norton Folgate. Although the chapel and monastic buildings were mostly demolished in the time of Henry VIII, the Liberty remained an autonomous area outside of any parish. The adjacent outer precincts, to the south, were re-used for artillery practice by the gunners of the Tower of London. The area, known as the Old Artillery Ground was placed under the special jurisdiction of the Tower of London as one of its Tower Liberties.

Other parts of the priory area were used for residential purposes by London dwellers seeking a rural retreat and by the mid-17th century further development extended eastward into the erstwhile open farmland of the Spital Field.

=== Huguenots ===
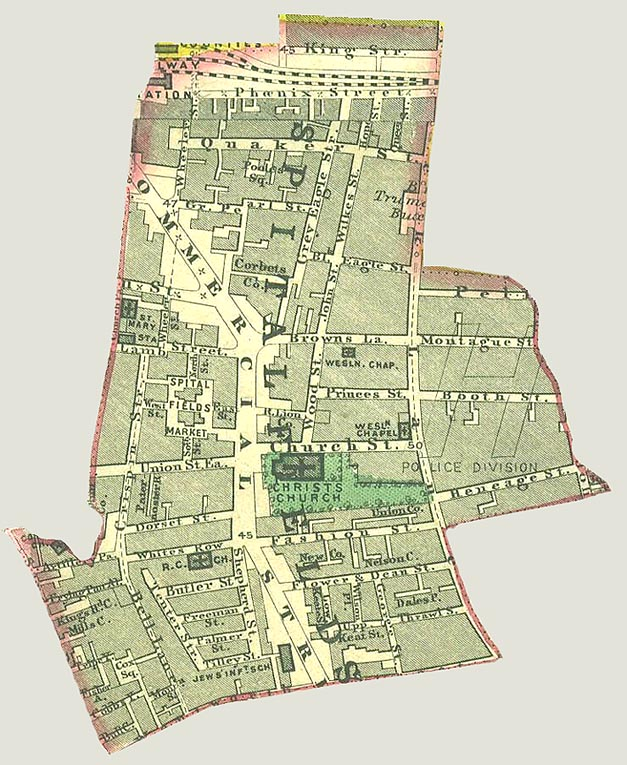
A map showing the bounds of the Parish of Spitalfields, c. 1885

Spitalfields consisted mainly of fields and nursery gardens until its development in the late 17th century. The main local industry at that time was weaving, and many of the weavers were Huguenot refugees from France. Spitalfields' historic association with the silk industry was established by French Protestant (Huguenot) refugees who settled in the area after the Revocation of the Edict of Nantes in 1685. By settling outside the bounds of the City of London, they hoped to avoid the restrictive legislation of the City guilds.

The Huguenots brought with them little, apart from their skills, and an Order in Council of 16 April 1687 raised £200,000 to relieve their poverty. In December 1687, the first report of the committee set up to administer the funds reported that 13,050 French refugees were settled in London, primarily around Spitalfields, but also in the nearby settlements of Bethnal Green, Shoreditch, Whitechapel and Mile End New Town.

The late 17th and 18th centuries saw an estate of well-appointed terraced houses, built to accommodate the master weavers controlling the silk industry, and grand urban mansions built around the newly created Bishops Square which adjoins the short section of the main east–west street known as Spital Square. Christ Church, Spitalfields on Fournier Street, designed by the architect Nicholas Hawksmoor, was built during the reign of Queen Anne to demonstrate the power of the established church to the dissenting Huguenots, who had built ten chapels in the area. More humble weavers dwellings were congregated in the Tenterground. The Spitalfields Mathematical Society was established in 1717. In 1846, it merged with the Royal Astronomical Society.

Spitalfields Market was established in 1638 when Charles I gave a licence for flesh, fowl and roots to be sold in what was then known as Spittle Fields. The market currently receives around 25,000 visitors every week.

Huguenots of Spitalfields is a registered charity promoting public understanding of the Huguenot heritage and culture in Spitalfields, the City of London and beyond. They arrange tours, talks, events and schools programmes to raise the Huguenot profile in Spitalfields and to raise funds for a permanent memorial to the Huguenots.

From the 1730s Irish weavers came, after a decline in the Irish linen industry, to take up work in the silk trade. The 18th century saw periodic crises in the silk industry, brought on by imports of French silk – in a lull between the wars between the two rivals; and imports of printed calicos. The depression in the trade and the prices paid to weavers led to protests. In 1769, the Spitalfield riots occurred when attempts were made to disperse protest meetings by weavers during the downturn in the market for silk. The riots ended in an Irish and a Huguenot weaver being hanged in front of the Salmon and Ball public house at Bethnal Green.

Price controls on amounts master weavers could pay journeymen for each piece were established, removing incentives to pay higher wages during good times. During bad times workers had no work. As the price was per piece, there was no incentive for using machinery, as the master would have to pay for the machine and still pay the same price per piece to journeymen. By 1822 labour rates were so above market labour rates, that much of the employment in silk manufacture had moved away. Remaining manufacture focussed on expensive fashion items, which required proximity to court and had higher margins.

In 1729, Spitalfields was detached from the parish of Stepney, and became an independent parish; by this time parish areas had both civil and ecclesiastical (church) functions. The area's parish church was Christ Church, Spitalfields, with St Stephen Spitalfields added later. The church of St Stephen Spitalfields was built in 1860 by public subscription but was demolished in 1930. The adjacent vicarage is all that remains.

=== Victorian era ===
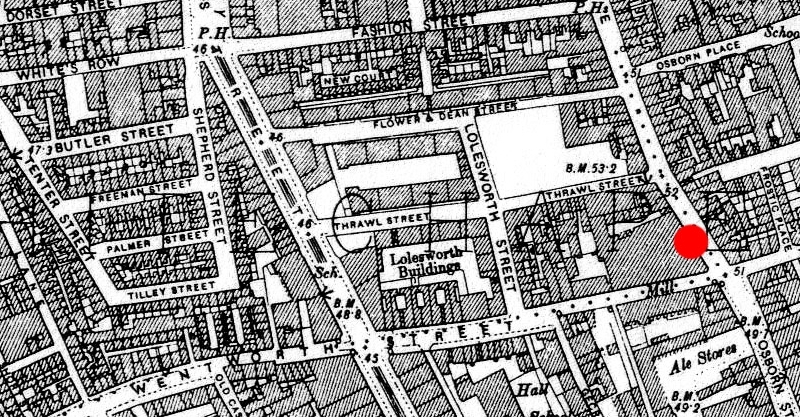
An ordnance survey map of Spitalfields rookery, 1894

By the Victorian era, the silk industry had entered a long decline and the old merchant dwellings had degenerated into multi-occupied slums. Spitalfields became a by-word for urban deprivation, and, by 1832, concern about a London cholera epidemic led The Poor Man's Guardian (18 February 1832) to write of Spitalfields:

The low houses are all huddled together in close and dark lanes and alleys, presenting at first sight an appearance of non-habitation, so dilapidated are the doors and windows:- in every room of the houses, whole families, parents, children and aged grandfathers swarm together.

In 1860, a treaty with France allowed the import of cheaper French silks. This left the many weavers in Spitalfields, as well as neighbouring Bethnal Green and Shoreditch, unemployed and indigent. New trades such as furniture and boot making came to the area, and the large windowed Huguenot houses were found suitable for tailoring, attracting a new population of Jewish refugees drawn to live and work in the textile industry.

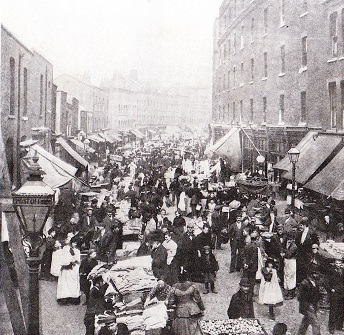
Petticoat Lane Market, Spitalfields, c. 1890

By the later 19th century, inner Spitalfields became known as the worst criminal rookery in London and common lodging-houses in the Flower and Dean Street area were a focus for the activities of robbers and pimps. In 1881, Flower and Dean Street was described as being "perhaps the foulest and most dangerous street in the metropolis". Another claimant to the distinction of being the worst street in London was Dorset Street, which was highlighted by the brutal killing and mutilation of a young woman, Mary Jane Kelly, in her lodgings here by the serial killer Jack the Ripper in the autumn of 1888. The murder was the climax of a series of murders that became known as the Whitechapel Murders.

The parish of Spitalfields formed two of the wards, in the Metropolitan Borough of Stepney, which was formed in 1900.

The renewed focus on the area's poverty helped prompt the decision to demolish some local slums in 1891–1894. Deprivation continued and was brought to notice by social commentators such as Jack London in his The People of the Abyss (1903). He highlighted 'Itchy Park', next to Christ Church, Spitalfields, as a notorious rendezvous for homeless people.

=== Modern Spitalfields ===
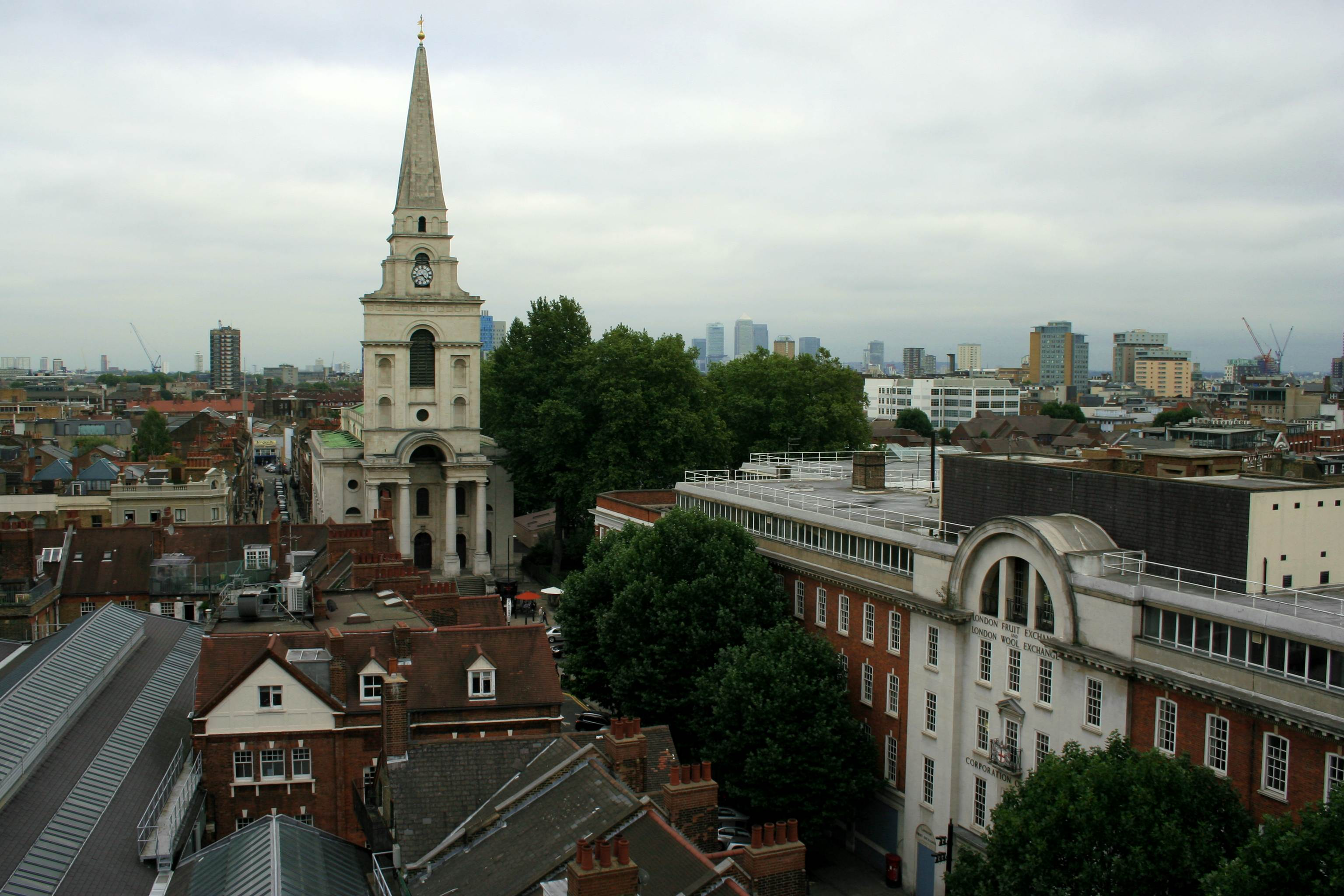
A view of Christ Church and the fruit and wool exchange

In the late 20th century the Jewish presence diminished and was replaced by an influx of Bangladeshi immigrants, who also worked in the local textile industry and made Brick Lane the curry capital of London. By 1981, at least 60% of households were of minority ethnic origin.

Another development, from the 1960s onwards, has been a campaign to save the housing stock of old merchant terraces west of Brick Lane from demolition. Many have been conserved by the Spitalfields Historic Buildings Trust which has led to gentrification and a large increase in property prices. In the 21st century, large office blocks were built between Bishopsgate and Spitalfields Market, affecting the character of the area. Conservationists secured the preservation of Old Spitalfields Market and the provision of shopping, leisure amenities and a plaza (urban square) beside the blocks, but permission was granted to developers, to demolish the Fruit and Wool Exchange on the edge of old Spitalfields market, in order to erect office buildings.

Since 1998 the area has formed part of the Spitalfields and Banglatown electoral ward. The name reflecting the areas strong links with Bangladesh. In September 2015, a demonstration against gentrification in London took the form of a protest at Cereal Killer Cafe, a cereal-themed café on Brick Lane.

== Demographics ==
The recorded population of Spitalfields & Banglatown ward in 2021 was 14,166, increasing 0.59% since the 2011 census. The most recent demographic data available comes from the 2021 United Kingdom Census, conducted by the Office for National Statistics. Spitalfields & Banglatown ward has the following demographics:

AGE

Age Range	%	Observations
Aged 0 to 4	5.0%	710
Aged 5 to 9	4.2%	600
Aged 10 to 14	4.6%	650
Aged 15 to 19	6.0%	840
Aged 20 to 24	14.5%	2100
Aged 25 to 29	18.0%	2500
Aged 30 to 34	11.8%	1700
Aged 35 to 39	7.9%	1100
Aged 40 to 44	6.9%	970
Aged 45 to 49	5.4%	770
Aged 50 to 54	4.0%	570
Aged 55 to 59	3.1%	430
Aged 60 to 64	3.0%	420
Aged 65 to 69	2.2%	310
Aged 70 to 74	1.2%	180
Aged 75 to 79	0.8%	110
Aged 80 to 84	0.8%	120
Aged 85 and over	0.6%	90

ETHNICITY

Ethnic Group	%	Observations
Asian, Asian British or Asian Welsh	51.8%	6911
Black, Black British, Black Welsh, Caribbean or African	4.7%	621
Mixed or Multiple ethnic groups	4.3%	571
White	35.7%	4763
Other ethnic group	3.6%	479

RELIGION

Religion	%	Observations
No religion	26.5%	3539
Christian	16.0%	2135
Buddhist	1.2%	161
Hindu	2.0%	271
Jewish	0.5%	69
Muslim	45.6%	6080
Sikh	0.2%	27
Other religion	0.5%	72
Not answered	7.4%	988

SEX

Sex	%	Observations
Female	45.7%	6500
Male	54.3%	7700

GENDER IDENTITY *Gender identity data could not be located for Spitafields & Banglatown, so data provided is for the Tower Hamlets Borough which contains Spitafields

Gender identity (8 categories)	Observation	%
Gender identity the same as sex registered at birth	229263	90.7%
Gender identity different from sex registered at birth but no specific identity given	1438	0.6%
Trans woman	344	0.1%
Trans man	350	0.1%
Non-binary	350	0.1%
All other gender identities	161	0.1%
Not answered	20975	8.3%

== Community ==
Spitalfields has a strong sense of local community, where many organizations exist to serve residents and improve ways of living in the neighborhood. There are groups for preservation of the neighborhood, community groups, and charities all focused on Spitalfields. The Spitalfields Housing Association works closely with residents by providing community services. Spitalfields Music, a charity based in the East End, runs concerts, workshops and community-education initiatives for Tower Hamlets residents, providing music access to children, older adults, and care-home residents.

The Spitalfields Trust campaigns to save historic buildings and preserve local heritage. Social services in the area are also provided by the Spitalfields Crypt Trust, a charity founded in 1965 that offers supported housing, rehabilitation services, and community outreach for people experiencing homelessness or addiction. Spitalfields also contains Nomadic Community Gardens, a social project which provides space for the community to come together and garden and is made up of found materials, street art, sculpture and allotments.

== Arts & Culture ==
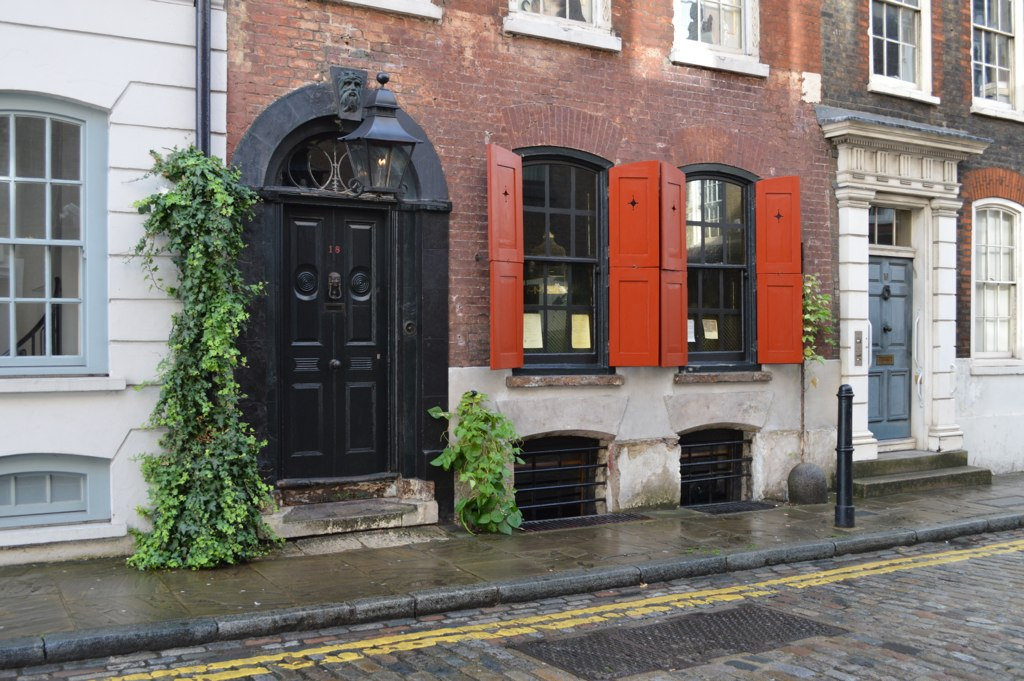
Dennis Severs' House

Dennis Severs' House in Folgate Street is a "still-life drama" created by the Severs as an "historical imagination" of what life would have been like inside for a family of Huguenot silk weavers. The Society for the Protection of Ancient Buildings has its headquarters nearby, at 37 Spital Square, a Georgian terraced house once inhabited by Huguenots and Russian Jewish leatherworkers. Whitechapel Art Gallery is on the north side of Whitechapel High Street.

Amongst the many well known artists living in Spitalfields are Gilbert and George, Tracey Emin and Stuart Brisley. TV presenter and architecture expert Dan Cruickshank was an active campaigner for Spitalfields, and continues to live in the area. Writer Jeanette Winterson turned a derelict Georgian house into an organic food shop, Verde's, as part of the Slow Food movement.

Spitalfields figures in a number of works of literature, including A New Wonder, a Woman Never Vexed (performed 1610–1614; printed 1632) by William Rowley, a dramatisation of the foundation of St Mary Spital; The People of the Abyss (1903), the journalistic memoir by Jack London; Hawksmoor (1985) by Peter Ackroyd; Rodinsky's Room (1999) by Iain Sinclair and Rachel Lichtenstein; Brick Lane (2003) by Monica Ali; and The Quincunx (1991) by Charles Palliser.

In December 2009 an anonymous Spitalfields resident started a blog called Spitalfields Life, writing under the pseudonym "The Gentle Author", and promising to post 10,000 daily essays. As of June 2020, the writer had posted over 4,000 articles about life in Spitalfields, and the surrounding areas within walking distance.

== Economy ==
The economic makeup of Spitalfields is primarily centred around its four marketplaces. Old Spitalfields Market is the main one where traders sell antiques, food and fashion items, while Petticoat Lane Market mainly sells general clothing.

Economic status of residents in Spitalfields & Banglatown Ward from 2021 UK Census:

Economic Status	%	Observations
Economically active: In employment	56.6%	6414
Economically active: Unemployed	6.8%	770
Economically inactive	36.6%	4150

== Notable people ==
- William Allen (1770–1843), scientist and philanthropist
- Inga Beale (born 1963), British businesswoman, the CEO of Lloyd's of London 2013–2018. Beale is Lloyd's first female CEO in the insurance market's 325-year history.
- Dan Cruickshank (born 1949), art and architectural historian
- Nicholas Culpeper (1616–1654), botanist, herbalist, physician, and astrologer was born at the Red Lion Inn, when the area was still semi-rural.
- Joan Dant (1631–1715), entrepreneur
- Tracey Emin (1963–), artist, resides in Fournier Street.
- Anna Maria Garthwaite (?1688–1763), designer of silk fabrics; blue plaque at 2 Princelet Street
- Mark Gertler (1891–1939), painter, lesser member of the Bloomsbury Group, in love with Dora Carrington whom he met at the Slade School of Art. Born in Gun St of Polish Jewish parents.
- Gilbert & George (born 1943, born 1942), artists, reside in Fournier Street.
- Samuel Gompers (1850–1924), founder of the American Federation of Labor (AFL), was born in Spitalfields in a Jewish family of cigarmakers originally from Amsterdam until emigration to New York in 1863.
- Thomas Helwys (c. 1575 – c. 1616), religious reformer who fled to Amsterdam in 1607/8, but returned in 1611 to found first Baptist congregation on British soil in Spitalfields. Died in prison for public advocacy of religious liberty for all, regardless of creed, even Jews, Muslims, and atheists.
- Basil Henriques (1890–1961), for whom Henriques Street (formerly Berner Street) is named.
- Jack the Ripper: all of his victims or presumed victims lived in Spitalfields and two (Chapman and Kelly) were murdered there (the others being murdered in nearby Whitechapel):
  - Annie Chapman (c. 1841 – 1888), resided at a common lodging house at 35 Dorset Street. Her body was found at 29 Hanbury Street
  - Mary Jane Kelly (c. 1863 – 1888), lived and was murdered at 13 Millers Court, just off Dorset Street.
  - Martha Tabram (1849–1888), resided at a common lodging house at 19 George Street.
  - Mary Ann Nichols (1845–1888), resided at a common lodging house at 18 Thrawl Street.
  - Elizabeth Stride (1843–1888), resided at a common lodging house at 32 Flower and Dean Street.
  - Catherine Eddowes (1842–1888), resided with her partner John Kelly at Cooney's common lodging house at 55 Flower and Dean Street.
- Keira Knightley (born 1985), actress, lived for a while on Wilkes Street.
- Sydney Kyte (1896–1981), bandleader, born in Spitalfields.
- Joe Loss (1909–1990), born locally, founder of the Joe Loss Orchestra.
- Wolf Mankowitz (1924–1998), writer, playwright and screenwriter, of Russian Jewish descent, was born in Fashion Street.
- Keith Mansfield, writer and publisher, lives locally.
- Samantha Morton, actor, lived on Wilkes Street.
- John Nicolson, one time journalist and broadcaster and a former MP for the Scottish National Party (2015–2017); owns a house on Fournier Street which he has restored and renovated himself.
- George Peabody (1795–1869), established the Peabody Donation Fund, which continues to this day, as the Peabody Trust, to provide good quality housing "for the deserving poor" in London: the fund's first block of dwellings opened in Commercial Street in 1864.
- Sian Phillips (born 1933), actress
- Jonathan Pryce (born 1947), actor and singer
- Lutfur Rahman, first directly elected mayor of Tower Hamlets and former ward councillor
- Raphael Samuel, historian, lived at 19 Elder Street from the early 1960s until his death in 1996.
- Dennis Severs (1944–1999), lived at 18 Folgate Street 1979–1999.
- Jack Sheppard (1702–1724), highwayman and multiple absconder, born in New Fashion Street, now known as White's Row.
- Obadiah Shuttleworth (died 1734), musician
- Sir Benjamin Truman (1699/1700–1780), brewer
- Arnold Wesker (1932–2016), playwright, author, poet, born in Mother Levy's Maternity Home, Underwood Rd. With his family took refuge during WW2 in "Mickey's Shelter" below the Fruit & Wool Exchange.
- Jeanette Winterson (born 1959), writer, lives on Brushfield Street where she also runs a delicatessen.
- Mary Wollstonecraft (1759–1797), early feminist, born locally, possibly at 21 Hanbury Street.
- Joe Wright (born 1972), film director, bought a house on Wilkes Street but in 2013 sold it to actor Jonathan Pryce

== Crime ==
Spitalfields is policed by the Metropolitan Police Service. The current sergeants of the Spitalfields and Banglatown policing team are Sergeant Amy Skingsley and Sergeant Nicholas Cousins. The top reported crimes from October 2024 to September 2025 are anti-social behaviour, violence and sexual offences, and theft. Crime has remained relatively consistent from 2023 to 2025, staying around 1000 crimes reported per quarter.

Top 10 Crime Types in Spitalfields and Banglatown Area (Oct 2024 – Sep 2025)

Anti-social behaviour	1133	23.8%
Violence and sexual offences	955	20.1%
Other theft	487	10.2%
Theft from the person	441	9.3%
Shoplifting	406	8.5%
Public order	286	6%
Burglary	205	4.3%
Criminal damage and arson	202	4.2%
Drugs	181	3.8%
Vehicle crime	163	3.4%

== Transport ==
=== Railway ===
Spitalfields has no connection to the London Underground. Historically it had a station on the Great Eastern Main Line called Bishopsgate (Low Level) that opened in November 1872, and closed in May 1916. Shoreditch tube station, the northern terminus of the East London Line, technically lay within the boundaries of Spitalfields, but principally served Shoreditch: it closed in 2006. Liverpool Street station (mainline and underground), Aldgate East (underground) and Shoreditch High Street (London Overground) are all in close proximity to Spitalfields.

=== Road ===
The area is formed around Commercial Street, on the A1202 London Inner Ring Road.

== See also ==
- List of schools in the London Borough of Tower Hamlets
- Old Truman Brewery – The Black Eagle Brewery on Brick Lane, and into surrounding streets.
- Spitalfields riots
- Spitalfields Festival
- Stepney Historical Trust
