= Christ Church, Spitalfields =

Church in London, England

Christ Church
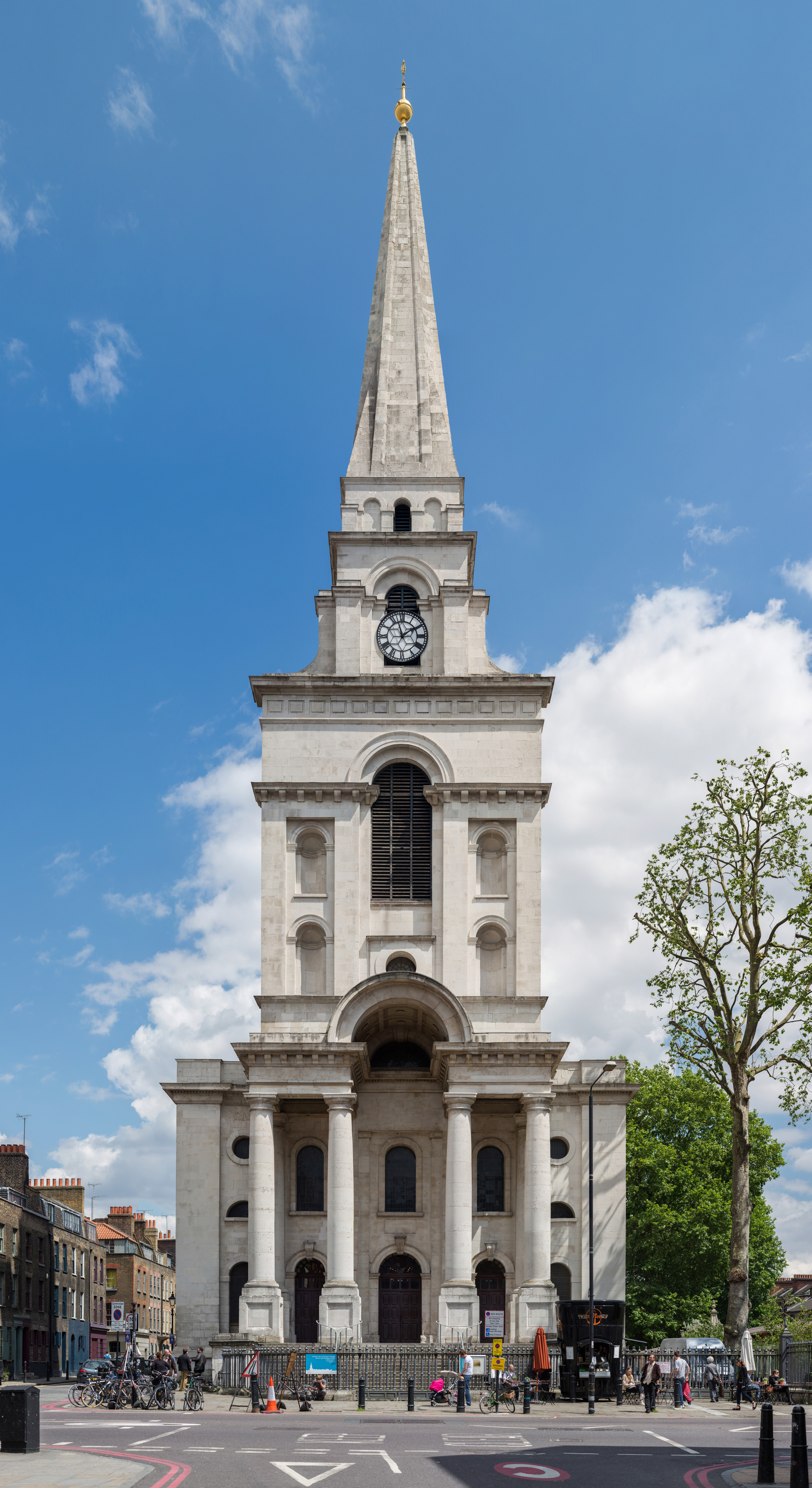
- Christ Church
- 51°31′8.73″N 00°04′27.05″W
- OS grid reference: TQ 33748 81780
- Location: London, E1
- Country: England
- Denomination: Church of England
- Churchmanship: Low Church Evangelical
- Website: www.ccspits.org

History
- Status: Parish church
- Consecrated: July 1729

Architecture
- Functional status: Active
- Heritage designation: Grade I listed
- Architect: Nicholas Hawksmoor
- Style: English Baroque

Administration
- Province: Canterbury
- Diocese: London
- Archdeaconry: Hackney

Clergy
- Rector: Darren Wolf

Spittlefields, Stepney (Parish) Act 1727
- Act of Parliament
- Parliament of Great Britain
- Long title: An Act for making the Hamlet of Spittle-fields in the Parish of Saint Dunstan Stebunheath, alias Stepney, in the County of Middlesex, a distinct Parish, and for providing a Maintenance for the Minister of such new Parish.
- Citation: 2 Geo. 2. c. 10
- Territorial extent: Great Britain

Dates
- Royal assent: 14 May 1729
- Commencement: 21 January 1729 (Note: Start of session.)
- Repealed
Other legislation
Repealed by	London Government (Borough of Stepney) Order in Council 1901

Status: Repealed

Text of statute as originally enacted

Christ Church Spitalfields is an Anglican church built between 1714 and 1729 to a design by Nicholas Hawksmoor. On Commercial Street in the East End and in today's Central London it is in the London Borough of Tower Hamlets, on its western border facing the City of London, it was one of the first of the so-called "Commissioners' Churches" built for the Commission for Building Fifty New Churches, which had been established by an act of parliament in 1711.

The purpose of the commission was to acquire sites and build fifty new churches to serve London's new settlements. This parish was carved out of the circa 1 square mile (2.6 km^{2}) medieval Stepney parish for an area then dominated by Huguenots (French Protestants and other 'dissenters' who owed no allegiance to the Church of England and thus to the King) as a show of Anglican authority. Some Huguenots used it for baptisms, marriages and burials but not for everyday worship, preferring their own chapels (their chapels were severely plain compared with the bombastic English Baroque style of Christ Church) though increasingly they assimilated into English life and Anglican worship – which was in the eighteenth century relatively plain.

The Commissioners for the new churches including Christopher Wren, Thomas Archer and John Vanbrugh appointed two surveyors, one of whom was Nicholas Hawksmoor. Only twelve of the planned fifty churches were built, of which six were designed by Hawksmoor.

== Architecture ==
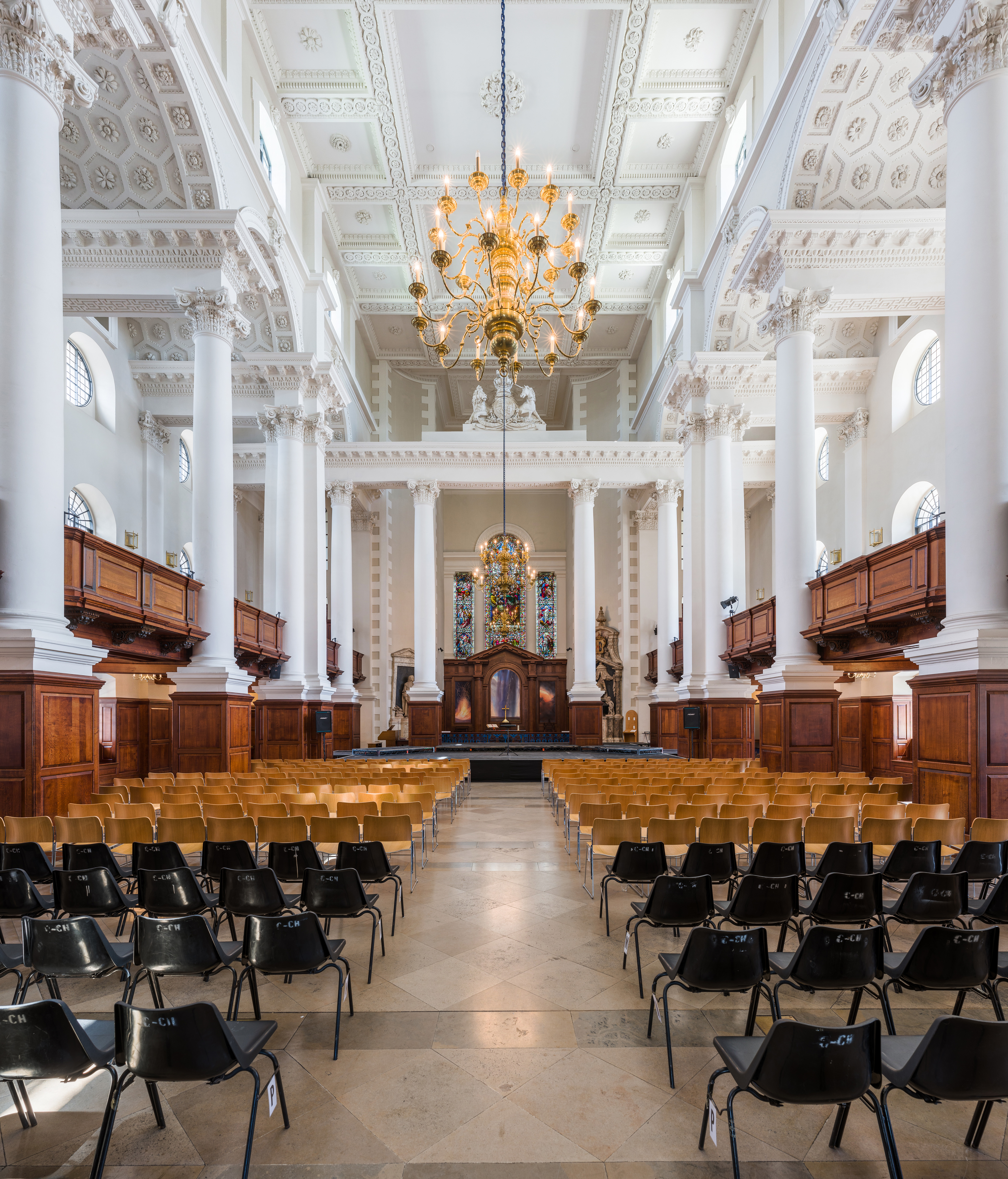
The interior

The architectural composition of Christ Church demonstrates Hawksmoor's usual abruptness: the very plain rectangular box of the nave is surmounted at its western end by a broad tower of three stages topped by a steeple more Gothic than classical. The magnificent porch with its semi-circular pediment and Tuscan columns is attached bluntly to the western end: it may indeed be a late addition to the design intended to add further support to the tower. Like those of Hawksmoor's other London churches and many of Wren's, the central space of the nave is organised around two axes, the shorter originally emphasised by two entrances of which only that to the south remains. It has a richly decorated flat ceiling and is lit by a clerestory.

The aisles are roofed with elliptical barrel-vaults carried on raised Composite order columns (cf. Wren's St James's, Piccadilly), and the same order is used for the screens across the eastern and western ends. The Venetian window at the east may show the growing influence of the revival of Palladian architecture, or it may be a rhyme with the arched pediment of the entrance portico, repeated in the wide main stage of the tower. The east window is a double window, one inside, one outside, the effect now obscured by the Victorian stained glass window between the two.

In his book Complexity and Contradiction in Architecture, Robert Venturi remarks on the tower of Christ Church, Spitalfields as "a manifestation of both-and at the scale of the city. Hawksmoor's tower is both a wall and a tower. Toward the bottom the vista is terminated by the extension of its walls into kinds of buttresses perpendicular to the approaching street. They are seen from only one direction. The top evolves into a spire, which is seen from all sides, spatially and symbolically dominating the skyline of the parish."

=== Alterations ===
In 1836, Wallen Son and Beatson, local architects and surveyors, provided a substantial estimate for repairs to the church following a fire. The church was severely altered in 1850 by Ewan Christian (better known as architect of London's National Portrait Gallery), who removed the side galleries, blocked in the windows at the corners of the central space, and combined upper and lower aisle windows to make tall, thin windows.

=== Churchyard ===
The churchyard was closed to burials in 1856. It was converted to a public garden by the Metropolitan Public Gardens Association in 1892, laid out to a design by the landscape gardener Fanny Wilkinson. However, it was largely built over by the church school, and only a small portion of the garden remains.

== Organ ==
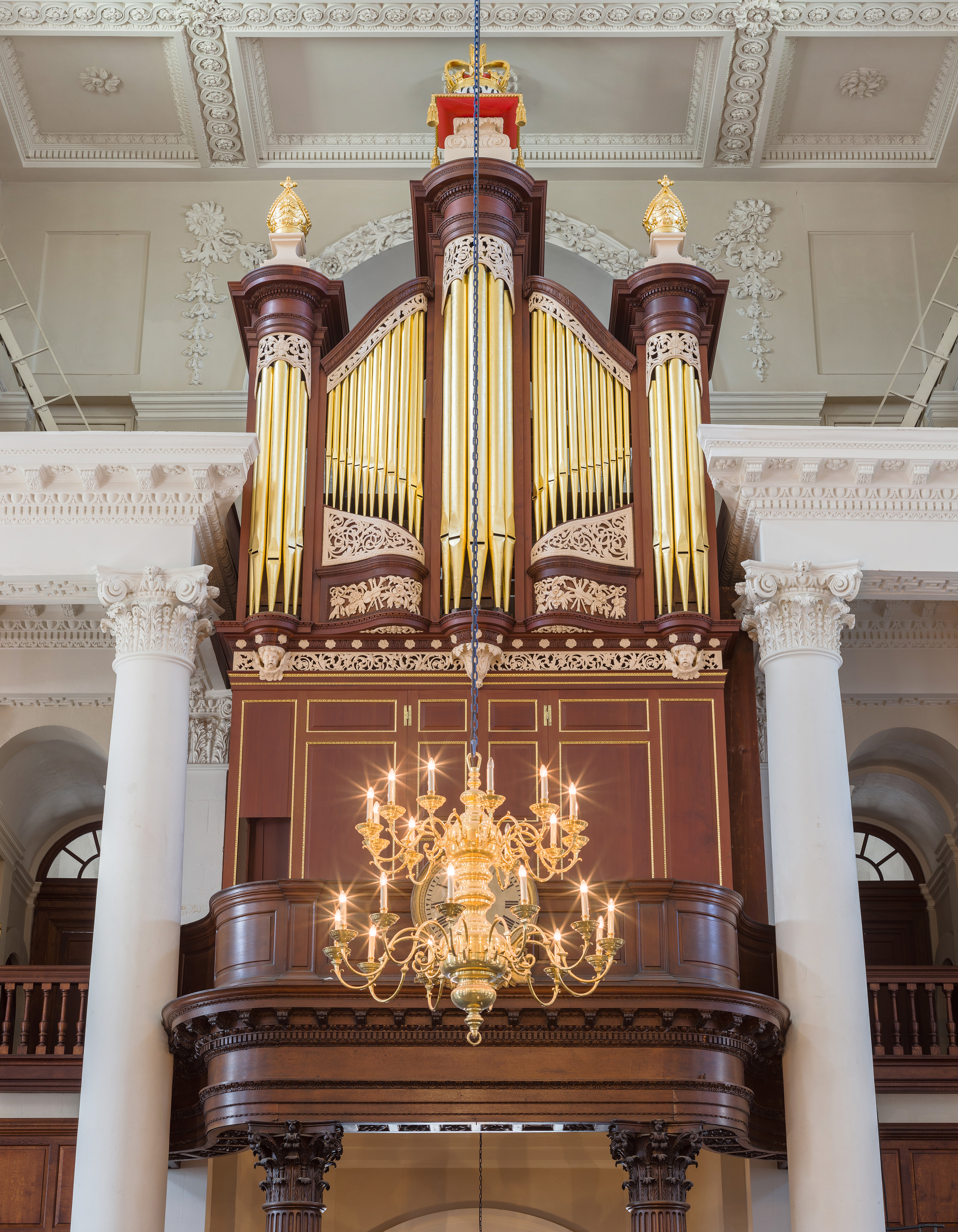
The restored organ

The organ in the church was inaugurated in 1735, the work of Richard Bridge, a most celebrated builder of the time. With over two thousand pipes it was, when built, the largest organ in England, a record it held for over a hundred years. In the nineteenth century work was done at various times and further changes were made in the 1920s; remarkably, much of the original Richard Bridge organ survives. The organ became derelict and was not heard in public from about 1960 onwards.

The magnificent organ case, largely of walnut, and the completeness of the Georgian survivals, make this a historic instrument of national importance. The involvement of local expert Michael Gillingham was largely responsible for the decision to have it restored to working condition. The organ parts were dismantled and removed for safe keeping and to protect them from damage during the restoration of the building. A scheme of conservative restoration was prepared by organ builder William Drake and the restored organ was installed in 2014.

== Restoration ==
By 1960 Christ Church was nearly derelict and services were held in the Church Hall (an ex Huguenot Chapel in Hanbury Street) as the roof of Christ Church itself was declared unsafe. The Hawksmoor Committee staved off the threat of wholesale demolition of the empty building—proposed by the then Bishop of Stepney, Trevor Huddleston—and ensured that the roof was rebuilt with funds from the sale of the bombed out shell of St John's, Smith Square, now a concert hall. A rehabilitation centre for homeless alcoholic men was housed in part of the crypt from the 1960s until 2000 when it relocated to purpose built accommodation above ground. In 1976 the Friends of Christ Church Spitalfields, an independent charity, was formed to raise money and project manage the restoration of this Grade I listed building so it could be brought back into use. Church services returned to the partially restored building in 1987 and the restoration of the building was finally complete in 2004, enabling a wide range of uses to run alongside its primary function as a place of worship.

As part of the restoration process, the burial vaults beneath the church had to be cleared. Instead of hiring a commercial undertaker for this job, the Friends of Christ Church raised funds for the employment of an archaeological team, who excavated nearly 1,000 interments between 1984 and 1986. Of these, about 390 were identifiable from coffin name plates. Archaeologists and physical anthropologists took this opportunity to study Victorian mortuary practices and anthropology, including health and causes of death of the local population. The project was written up as a two-volume landmark study.

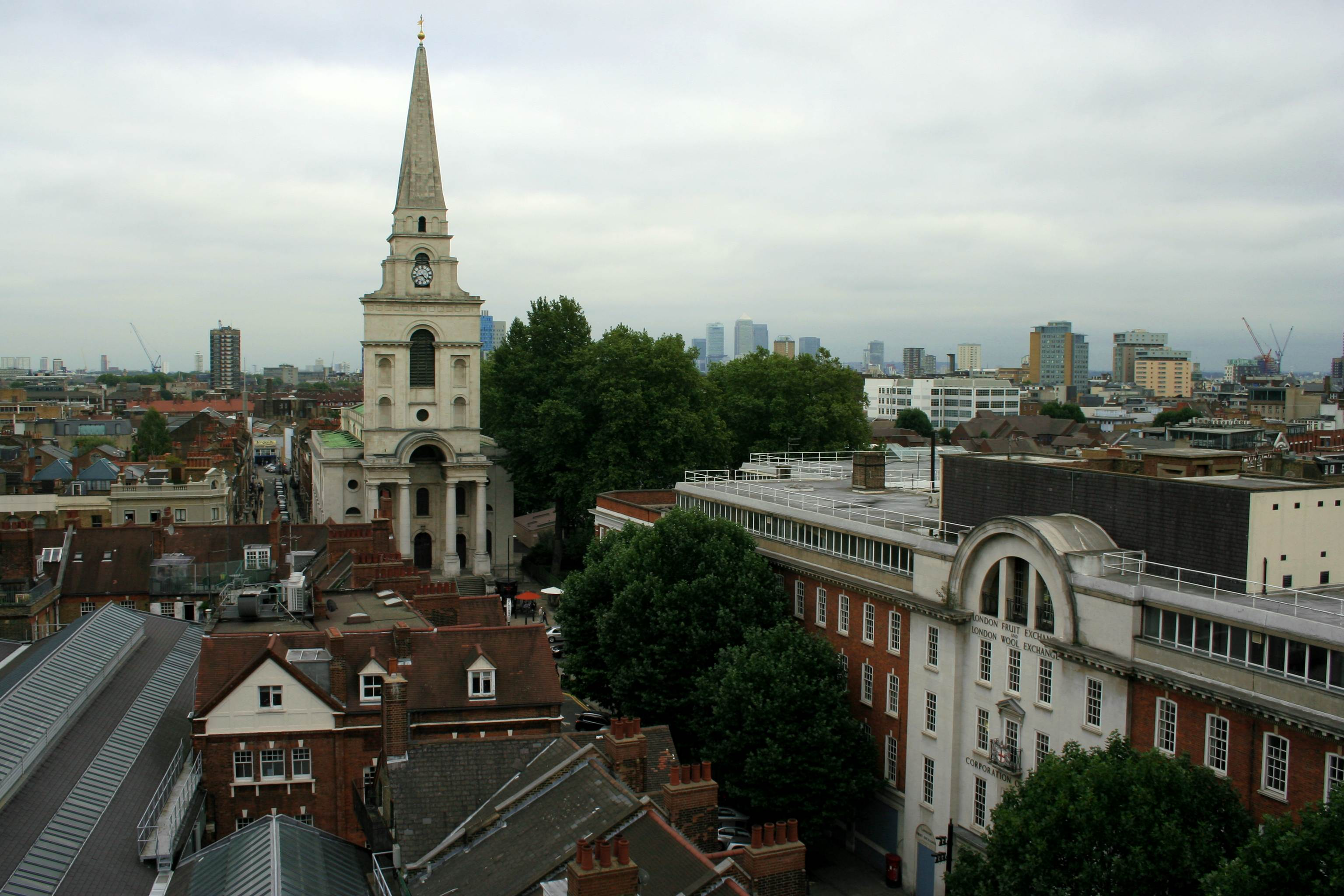
View of Christ Church and the fruit and wool exchange in September 2013

The portico at the west end was repaired and cleaned in 1986, when Ewan Christian's re-arrangement of the aisle windows was also replaced by a recreation of the originals, scrupulously researched. The 202 ft tower and spire were consolidated and cleaned in 1997. The south façade was cleaned and repaired in 1999 revealing the striking whiteness and beauty of the Portland stone and the delicate detailing, both quickly obscured by weather and city pollution.

Hawksmoor's double flight of steps on the south side, which was removed in the nineteenth century, was rebuilt. In addition, the gate piers of the Rectory yard were repaired and the large iron gates restored. Regency style railings to the churchyard, removed in World War II, were replaced. The north and east façades were repaired and cleaned in 1999–2000. The restoration of the interior, begun in 2000 and completed in 2004, restored the fabric of the church; removed the nineteenth- and twentieth-century alterations; reinstated the original arrangement of galleries following archaeology to establish their original pattern; and has recaptured the proportions, light and clarity of Hawksmoor's original design.

In 2015 the Crypt was also restored, restoring much of Hawksmoor's original walls as well as providing a café area. This is accessible via a ramp to make disabled access possible and encourage use by the local community. In February 2016 the restoration of the Crypt was shortlisted in the RICS Awards 2016, London in the 'Building conservation' category.

Thus, after years of neglect, the church was restored to its pre-1850 condition, working from the original building documents where possible, a process that stretched over more than 25 years. The restoration revealed the most complex and sumptuous of Hawksmoor's interiors in London. Key players in the restoration were Andrew D "Red" Mason (Project Architect and building historian from 1976 to 2004), Revd. Eddy Stride (Rector), Eric Elstob (Chair of The Friends of Christ Church and benefactor), Howard Kenward, Derek Stride and Hosten Garroway (Wardens), The Hon Simon Sainsbury (benefactor), English Heritage and the Heritage Lottery Fund. "Red" Mason worked from 1972 to 2000 with the architects Whitfield Partners, and from 2000 with Purcell Miller Tritton.

== Present day ==
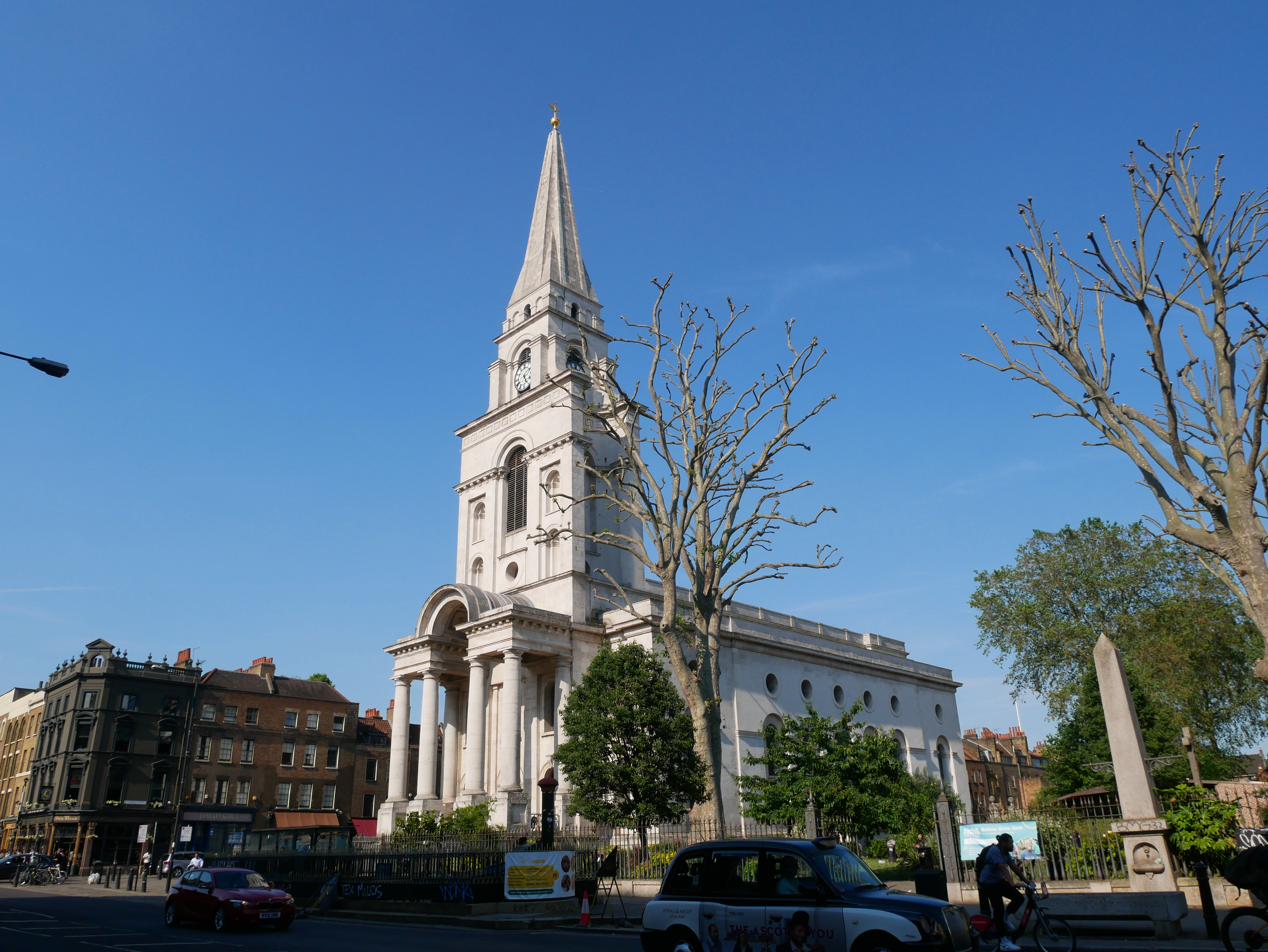
Southwest view of Christ Church

An evangelical Anglican parish, Christ Church is part of the HTB network. It is very active with Sunday services at 9 am, 11 am and 5 pm. Christ Church Spitalfields also offers various activities for young families, students and young adults.

The church also regularly runs the Alpha Course for those with questions about life and faith.

Leon Kossoff made several paintings of the church, beginning in 1987.

== See also ==
- List of churches and cathedrals of London
