= Grade II listed buildings in the City of London (EC1) =

The City of London is a major business and financial centre in London, England. It contains over 600 listed buildings that are recorded in the National Heritage List for England. Of these, over 400 are assesed to be at Grade II, the lowest grade. This list contains the Grade II listed buildings in the EC1 postal district of the city.

== Buildings ==
| Name and location | Photograph | Date | Notes |
|---|---|---|---|
| Hatfield House, Including Garden Walls to Rear; 51.52299°N 0.097043°W | — | 1958–61 | The listing consists of the seven storey block of 14 flats and 42 maisonettes, alongside a car park underneath, and garden walls to the south. Part of the Golden Lane Estate and designed by Chamberlin, Powell and Bon, the block is constructed from pink brick cross-wall with pink mortar, reinforced concrete roof and floor slabs, and painted concrete balconies. The exterior is partly of blue cladding panels, with some of opaque glass. The garden walls are also of pink brick and continue the line from the main block, and there is a brick and concrete ramp to the north that accesses the underground car park. |
| Basterfield House Including Steps to Garden; 51.52281°N 0.095825°W | | 1954–56 | Part of the Golden Lane Estate, the block was designed by Chamberlin, Powell and Bon and Ove Arup & Partners, and consists of 54 maisonettes over six storeys. Construction is of prink brick cross-wall with pink mortar, concrete floor and roof slabs, painted concrete balconies, and coloured infill panels with some of opaque glass. The lowest floor of maisonettes have steps paved in quarry tiles leading into a shared garden, and the upper floors are reached through access galleries through a staircase at the east end, and a freestanding lift tower at the west end. The end maisonettes at the north end have red-clad projections. |
| Bayer House and Raised Pavements to North and South; 51.52248°N 0.095436°W | | 1954–56 | A block of 30 maisonettes over six storeys, designed by Chamberlin, Powell and Bon and Ove Arup & Partners as part of the Golden Lane Estate. The block consists of a pink brick cross-wall construction with brick end walls and pink mortar, concrete floor and roof slabs, painted concrete balconies, and coloured infill panels, with a flat roof. The lowest maisonettes on the south side have steps leading down to a large shared garden set with decorative paviours, and the upper flats are reached through public access galleries via an end staircase and emergency staircase at opposite ends of the block. A raised walkway is present on the north side of the block leading from Stanley Cohen house to the rest of the estate. |
| Great Arthur House Including Boiler House; 51.52211°N 0.095984°W | | 1953–57 | A large block consisting of 120 flats and ground-floor estate offices laid out over 17 storeys. Designed by Chamberlin, Powell and Bon as part of the Golden Lane Estate, the block is constructed of reinforced concrete on concrete raft foundations with a painted pick-hammered finish on the side walls, golden yellow opaque cladding on the east and west elevations, and pick-hammering with grey brick infill on the ground floor. The principle elevations have cantilevered balconies of painted concrete, divided by wire-glass screens. The roof is of asphalt with a two-level rooftop garden, water tank, and lift motor room. When completed, the block was the tallest inhabited building in England. |
| Stanley Cohen House, Including Canopies and Retaining Walls to Golden Lane; 51.52267°N 0.094952°W | | 1954–56 | Four storey block with 32 flats that is part of the Golden Lane Estate, constructed from a reinforced concrete frame, with a pink brick basement and ground floor, grey engineering brick to the face fronting onto Golden Lane, shuttered concrete end walls, painted pick-hammering to the upper floors, and some golden yellow opaque and glass cladding to the side facing the garden. The building has a flat roofand concrete stairs with open steel balustrades in open wells. The screen wall canopy is mounted on painted concrete posts and extends east for the length of Golden Lane. A later open ceramic screen fills an opening at the northern end of the block, and there is a three-dimensional map of the estate incorporated at the southern end. |
| Bowater House; 51.52205°N 0.095194°W | | 1953–56 | Built by George Wimpey as the first block of the Golden Lane Estate, consisting of 30 maisonettes spread over six storeys. It is of a pink brick cross-wall construction with pink mortar, concrete floor and roof slabs, painted concrete balconies, glass infill panels, and a flat roof. The lowest floor of maisonettes have quarry tile steps leading down into a shared garden, whilst access to the upper floors is through public galleries via a glazed end staircase and further emergency escape stairwell at the opposite end. There is a blue clad projection to the maisonettes situated to the rear of the escape staircase, and there is a rubbish chute at the Fann Street elevation. A foundation stone is present within the building's skin recognising the beginning of the estate, which was laid by Sir Noël Vansittart Bowater, Bt. |
| Cuthbert Harrowing House; 51.52181°N 0.095881°W | | 1954–56 | A four storey block of 18 maisonettes constructed by George Wimpey as a constituent block of the Golden Lane Estate. It is of a pink brick cross-wall construction with pink mortar, concrete floor and roof slabs, painted concrete balconies, glass infill panels, and a flat roof. The lowest maisonettes have stairs of quarry tiles granting access to a shared garden, whilst the upper floors are reached by access galleries via a glazed staircase and emergency staircase at opposite ends of the block. There is a blue clas projection to the maisonettes at the rear of the emergency escape stairs, and a rubbish chute at the Fann Street elevation. |
| Community Centre and Surround to Attached Pond; 51.52218°N 0.095462°W | — | 1955–57 | A community centre and swimming pool for the Golden Lane Estate that was designed by Chamberlin, Powell and Bon and Ove Arup & Partners. It consists of a flat roofed two storey building, with the lower floor sunk into a basement courtyard overlooking the pool and formal garden. The pool has a stone surround with stepping stones. |
| Recreation Centre and Tenants' Hall, Including Baths, Gymnasium and Nursey; 51.52264°N 0.097000°W | | 1958–62 | The centre forms part of the Golden Lane Estate, and was designed by Chamberlin, Powell and Bon and Ove Arup & Partners. The tenants' hall is of a reinforced concrete construction with brick and sits on top of an L-shaped basement, with a flat asphalt roof on top. The building has grey brick piers with reinforced concrete brick-hammered arches over the top, to form an arcade-like design. The two storey pool and badminton court is steel-framed with large portions of glass, and is separated by walkways of concrete and painted posts. A children's playground is laid out on the concrete roof, and the grey brick nursery is situated on the ground floor over the entrance to the recreation centre. |
| Cullum Welch House With Steps and Raised Walkway Over Car Park; 51.52218°N 0.096731°W | | 1958–61 | 72 flats spread out over a six storey block as part of the Golden Lane Estate. The block was designed by Chamberlin, Powell and Bon and Ove Arup & Partners, and its construction is of reinforced concrete floor and roof slabs, brick piers arched over the basement, red cladding panels, and a flat roof. A car park is present beneath the block, and four prominent circular ventilation shafts rise out of this. |
| Bastion or Garden Feature, Including Ramps; 51.52259°N 0.096036°W | | 1956–57 | The feature is situated in the Golden Lane Estate designed by Chamberlin, Powell and Bon. It consists of a circular bastion of reinforced concrete clad in granite blocks, with a continuous seat on each side. It is paved in granite setts, and reached by steps or curved ramp on one side. |
| Former Porter Tun Room, Whitbread's Brewery (South Side); 51.52045°N 0.091340°W | — | 1776–84 | Formerly a storehouse of Samuel Whitbread's brewery, the building is of brown brick laid in Flemish bond, with a slate roof over the two storeys. The ground floor is now obscured behind late 20th century additions. The roof has the widest timber span in London after Westminster Hall. |
| 9 and 10, Little Britain; 51.51710°N 0.097851°W | | Late 19th century | A late 19th-century office building of four storeys, that is built in a Tudor style, and is of grey brick and terracotta construction. There is a central round-headed gable at the top of the facade. |
| 12, Little Britain; 51.51710°N 0.098024°W | | 1858 | Red brick and stone building of five storeys, the ground storey has a painted arcade, with the upper storeys also being arcaded. |
| Statue of the Prince Consort; 51.51776°N 0.10798°W | | 1874 | A bronze equestrian statue on a granite base, designed by Charles Bacon and depicting Prince Albert. |
| Bridge or Viaduct Over Farringdon Street; 51.51725°N 0.10509°W | | 1863–69 | The viaduct crosses the junction of Victoria Street with Farringdon Street, and is constructed from cast iron with granite support piers. The bridge has much decoration including pairs of statues and winged lions. Each balustrade has three lamp standards and the city arms. |
| Statue of Rowland Hill; 51.51632°N 0.098661°W | | 1881 | Consists of a standing bronze figure stood on a pink granite base. The work is by Edward Onslow Ford, and depicts Sir Rowland Hill. |
| 39 and 40, Cloth Fair; 51.51905°N 0.10001°W | | 18th century | A pair of three storey former houses, with a 19th-century stuccoed exterior and a plain yellow brick rear. To the front, there is a simply pilastered shop front, whilst there is a short stuccoed return to the east. |
| 44, 45 and 46 Cloth Fair, Including 43 Cloth Court and 51 Barley Mow Passage; 51.51887°N 0.10018°W | | Late 18th century | A number of conjoined properties of three storeys, constructed from yellow brick with a parapet to the roof. Numbers 43 and 44 have a simple pilastered shop front, whereas number 45 has a more interesting shop front with Barley Mow Passage down the side. The west return of number 45 is continued as number 51 Barley Mow Passage and is of three storeys of red brick, with an 18th-century shop front. |
| National Westminster Bank; 51.52045°N 0.097769°W | | Late 19th century | The former bank building is of stone construction with crowned Italianate detail. Of three storeys, the ground floor is faced with doric columns on pedestals, with a semi-circular balcony over a splayed corner with a round-headed door. A slate mansard roof tops the building. |
| Memorial to Sir William Wallace and Martyrs Memorial, St Bartholomew's Hospital; 51.51823°N 0.10049°W | | 17th century | Two separate large granite tablets on an exterior wall of St Bartholomew's Hospital. The first dedicated to Sir William Wallace, and the other to three 16th-century Protestant martyrs: John Rogers, John Bradford, and John Philpot. |
| Medical School St Bartholomew's Hospital; 51.51733°N 0.10115°W | | 1878 | Medical school designed by Edward I'Anson, three storeys tall, and built of yellow brick with a front of Portland stone. |
| 4, Snow Hill; 51.51699°N 0.10272°W | | 1875 | A plain office building of red brick and Portland stone construction, with a tiled roof topping the five storeys. The ground storey is painted with a carved cornice, and the top storey has carved panels and a pointed arch under a central gable. |
| North East Block with Attached Buildings, St Bartholomew's Hospital; 51.51812°N 0.10017°W | | 1791 | A block of St Bartholomew's Hospital designed by George Dance the Younger, consisting of three storeys of mostly stone. The ground storey has an arcaded and rusticated face, with a parapet to the roof. |
| 3 Lamp Standards in Courtyard, St Bartholomew's Hospital; 51.51745°N 0.099796°W | | Late 19th century | Set of three cast one iron standards of late 19th-century origin. One has a globular lantern missing. |
| Hand and Shears Public House; 51.51933°N 0.098810°W | | c1850 | The 19th century public house is situated on a corner plot and is of London stock brick with a painted timber front that has integrated leaded windows. The main area of the ground floor is arranged around a central bar, with both a rear saloon bar and small private bar. The top two storeys function as private accommodation, and are topped with a shallow double-ranged roof that is hipped to the west. The entrance to the pub is through a pair of curved doors in the corner of the building, alongside two other doors on either road-facing front. |
| K2 Telephone Kiosk, at Junction with West Smithfield; 51.51782°N 0.10110°W | | c1927 | K2 type public telephone kiosk as designed by Sir Giles Gilbert Scott. Consists of a square kiosk of cast iron painted in red, topped with a domed roof, and with perforated crowns adorning the top panel on each face. |
| Pair of K2 Telephone Kiosks in Central Markets; 51.51946°N 0.10134°W | | c1927 | A pair of K2 type public telephone kiosk as designed by Sir Giles Gilbert Scott. Consist of a square kiosk of cast iron painted in red, topped with a domed roof, and with perforated crowns adorning the top panel on each face. |
| K6 Telephone Kiosk in Central Markets; 51.51959°N 0.10145°W | | c1935 | K6 type public telephone kiosk as designed by Sir Giles Gilbert Scott. Consist of a square kiosk of cast iron painted in red, topped with a domed roof, and with unperforated crowns adorning the top panel on each face. |
| K6 Telephone Kiosk in Central Markets; 51.51944°N 0.10132°W | | c1935 | K6 type public telephone kiosk as designed by Sir Giles Gilbert Scott. Consist of a square kiosk of cast iron painted in red, topped with a domed roof, and with unperforated crowns adorning the top panel on each face. |
| K6 Telephone Kiosk in Central Markets; 51.51953°N 0.10141°W | | c1935 | K6 type public telephone kiosk as designed by Sir Giles Gilbert Scott. Consist of a square kiosk of cast iron painted in red, topped with a domed roof, and with unperforated crowns adorning the top panel on each face. |
| St Martins House; 51.51551°N 0.096721°W | | 1925 | The office building was designed by Leo Sylvester Sullivan, and consists of 10 storeys of a steel-frame construction with Portland stone facing, and a stone-coped mansard roof. The building is of a stripped classical style, with Graeco-Egyptian details by Henry Poole. On the ground floor is a slightly projecting central portico with a pair of Greek doric columns. The rear elevation is of a similar style, with a plain tradesman's entrance. Inside, the hall and landings have coffered decorative plaster ceilings and panelled walls, alongside a mahogany staircase. |
| The Jugged Hare Public House; 51.52092°N 0.092214°W | | Late 19th century | A late 19th-century public house constructed from yellow brick laid in Flemish bond with gauged red brick and stucco dressings, and a mansard roof of fish-scale slates over the four storeys. The building is situated on a corner site, and has a 20th-century reproduction of a 19th-century wooden pub front. Inside, is an incomplete 19th century front and back bar. |
| 53, 54 and 55, Chiswell Street; 51.52078°N 0.090908°W | | Late 18th century | A set of terraced houses, now converted into offices, with a public house on the ground floor. Consists of four storeys of brown brick set in Flemish bond, with the roof obscured by a parapet. (Centre building in image) |
| 56, Chiswell Street; 51.52076°N 0.090765°W | | Mid to late 18th century | Former public house, consisting of four storeys of brown brick set in Flemish bond with 19th-century stucco dressings, and a roof that is obscured by a parapet. The building is situated on a corner plot, and the ground floor has a base of black polished granite with a number of pilasters forming window bays. (Near building in image) |
| Entrance Wing, Whitbread's Brewery (South Side); 51.52087°N 0.091740°W | | c1867 | The listing consists of those buildings between the Partner's House and 53, Chiswell Street, that form part of the former Whitbread's Brewery. They are of a Flemish bonded yellow brick construction, with stone or possibly stucco, and a roof that is obscured by a parapet. The front of the building that faces onto Chiswell Street has two similar wings that flank a slightly recessed arched carriage entranceway, all of three storeys; a longer wing of two storeys extends to the east. The wings are of earlier origin, whilst the entrance bay is a late 19th-century addition. (Far right building in image) |
| Sugar Room, Whitbread's Brewery (South Side); 51.52055°N 0.091163°W | — | Early 19th century | Formerly a sugar room for Whitbread's Brewery, which is now in use as a conference and entertainment venue. It consists of two storeys of yellow brick laid in Flemish bond underneath a Welsh slate roof. An original queen post roof is extant inside. |
| Thirteen Bollards in the Yard, Whitbread's Brewery (South Side); 51.52084°N 0.091842°W | | 19th century | A set of thirteen bollards situated around the yard of the former Whitbread's Brewery: one at the east end, ten west of the entrance, and two to the east of the entrance. Made from cast iron, they are of a canon design. (One visible in right of image) |
| Whitbread's Brewery Building, Next to the King's Head Public House; 51.52081°N 0.092247°W | | 1904 | Former building forming part of Whitbread's Brewery, consisting of five storeys of a red brick and granite construction, with stone dressings, and a lead roof. The ground floor has a granite base with a segmented arch opening on the left hand side, which has subsequently been converted to a window. The first and second floors are framed by six giant Doric pilasters, and there is a brewery chimney to the south of the roof, with a stone band, panelled frieze, and bracketed cornice. |
| Bridge Over the Yard, Whitbread's Brewery (South Side); 51.52076°N 0.091716°W | | 1892 | A footbridge over the yard of the former Whitbread's Brewery. It is of iron trusses arranged in lattice, with a wooden and glazed superstructure, and a corrugated iron roof. The bridge is supported by two cast-iron columns at the north side, and a metal beam carried by a further two on the south side. (Top right in image) |
| Police Call Box at North East Angle of Number 1; 51.51679°N 0.097013°W | | c1935 | Constructed from cast iron, the rectangular police public call box has a segmented arched head with a narrow projecting hood. A globular light sits on top encased in a small, flat-topped cupola on a stepped base. The front face of the box consists of a set of instructions set behind a door with a glass face, with an opening name plate and embossed coat of arms above. There are 2 further flush doors beneath. |
| The Viaduct Public House; 51.51634°N 0.10176°W | | 1874–75 | The 19th century pub has a granite construction to the ground floor, and gault brick with painted stone dressings to the upper three floors. A slate mansard roof sits on top, alongside brick end stacks with moulded stone cornices. Inside, there is a quadrant-shaped bar on the ground floor with arcaded panelling, and many original fittings extant, cut and etched glass panels, a Jacobean-style countertop, marbled wood piers to enriched plaster frieze with cherub heads, and a wall of tall mirrors alternating with three paintings of pre-Raphaelite style women. The pub is listed due to its interior. |
| St Bartholomew House; 51.51870°N 0.10023°W | | 1906 | Built as a bank for W & J Biggerstaff and a tearooms, the building now serves as a restaurant. The building is of cream brick, with the main façade clad in Portland stone and having a lower course of granite. Arranged over five storeys, the property occupies a corner plot. Inside few of the original bank features remain, less the painted-over Art Nouveau in the stairwell lobby, two small sections of original iron balustrade, and some first floor doorways. The tearooms original marble walls and mirrors remain. |
| K2 Telephone Kiosk in Central Markets; 51.51961°N 0.10146°W | | c1927 | K2 type public telephone kiosk as designed by Sir Giles Gilbert Scott. Consists of a square kiosk of cast iron painted in red, topped with a domed roof, and with perforated crowns adorning the top panel on each face. |
| Cripplegate Institute; 51.52128°N 0.094722°W | | 1894 | Designed by Sidney R. J. Smith as an institute containing libraries, and auditorium, committee rooms, and classrooms. It consists of five storeys of red brick with stone dressings, and there are stone polygonal pilaster strips between window bays on the second, third, and fourth storeys. At the top, there is a balustrade to the parapet with obelisk pinnacles inbetween, and carved central pediment. |
| The Golden Boy of Pye Corner; 51.51726°N 0.10159°W | | Late 17th century | A carved and gold painted figure of a naked boy, set on a bracket on a wall in Cock Lane. It marks the point where the Great Fire of London was extinguished in 1666, and formerly had a pair of wings. |
| Circular Pool with Fountain in Courtyard, St Bartholomew's Hospital; 51.51745°N 0.10011°W | | Late 19th century | A late 19th-century fountain of stone with carved figures, situated in the courtyard of St Bartholomew's Hospital. |
| Drinking Fountain in Centre of Gardens; 51.51847°N 0.10116°W | | 1873 | A bronze statue of a female figure, crafted by John Birnie Philip. It is mounted on top of a platform of Portland stone and pink granite with multiple protruding drinking fountains, which sits on a stepped platform of York stone. |
| Gate and Railings to Former Churchyard of Church of St Botolph; 51.51687°N 0.097010°W | | Early 19th century | Situated on Aldersgate Street, the gates and railings serve Postman's Park, which is the former churchyard of St Botolph's, Aldersgate. They consist of an elaborate railing on top of a low rendered wall, a single gate, and a gothic drinking fountain dated 1870. |
| 54, Farringdon Street, 41, Farringdon Street, 24 and 25, Holborn Viaduct; 51.51710°N 0.10534°W | | 1863–69 | A pair of 3 storey pavilions situated immediately adjacent to southwest corner of Holborn Viaduct, containing stairs connecting the viaduct to Farringdon Street. The buildings are of Portland stone with slated mansard roof, and the elevation facing away from the viaduct has iron rail balconies across the open arches. A matching pair of pavilions previously stood at the north end of the viaduct. |
| Railings to Former Burial Ground of Christchurch; 51.51587°N 0.09944°W | | 18th century | 18th century railings, corner piers, gates and gate piers to the former churchyard of Christchurch Greyfriars. The cast-iron railings are set into a low rendered wall with stone coping, and the piers are of red brick with stone bases and stone caps. |
| Nos. 4, 4A and 5, Middle Street; 51.51940°N 0.09859°W | | Early 19th century | A pair of pink-yellow stock brick houses of four storeys with shopfronts on the ground floor. |
| Nos. 74 and 75, Long Lane; 51.51953°N 0.09897°W | | c1598 | Number 74 is a mathematical tiles to a jettied front, and modern tile-hanging on the upper floors, whilst number 75 has been re-fronted in brick. Both properties are of four storeys, and have Victorian shopfronts on the ground floor. The properties are two of few to survive the Great Fire of London, and were previously used as the offices for Chambers. |
| Railings and Dwarf Wall to Churchyard of Church of St Sepulchre; 51.51650°N 0.10231°W | | Early 19th century | Railings sat on top of a dwarf wall marking the boundary of the churchyard of St Sepulchre-without-Newgate. Incorporated into these, is a small drinking fountain from 1859 that was the first to be installed by the Metropolitan Drinking Fountain and Cattle Trough Association. |
| 1-8, Holborn Viaduct, 15, Old Bailey; 51.51633°N 0.10285°W | | 1874 | Originally built as a hotel, before being converted into offices, and now has reverted back to a hotel. It is of mixed bond brick with cream and red stone dressings, and slate mansard roofs with iron crestings. The Second Empire style building has five storeys with a round-arched entrance from the Old Bailey elevation, with further round-arched entrances in the Holborn Viaduct elevation. The third floor corner rooms have a balcony with a roof supported by a single column. |
| Snow Hill Police Station; 51.51706°N 0.10282°W | | 1926 | Former police station built in 1926 of stone with a slate roof. The five storey building is a blend of moderne and arts and crafts style. A full height polygonal bay of windows rises from the first floor to the roof. Police lanterns are mounted in parapets over single doors either side of the main entrance. A plaque is present on the building denoting the site as the former location of the Saracen's Head Inn. |
| Smithfield Poultry Market; 51.51869°N 0.10336°W | | 1961–63 | The poultry market was built by T. B. Bennett and Son and Ove Arup and Partners of a reinforced concrete frame with external dark blue brick cladding. The roof is of reinforced concrete clad in copper with circular rooflights throughout, and individual copper-clad gable roofs around the outside. The building is laid out with a square market hall in the centre with delivery bays to the north and south, a first floor gallery surrounded by offices, and a cold storage basement with a former public house. The market is accessed through open canopies at either end with no physical doors being present. The stalls in the market are of blue fronts with contemporary-style signage. |
| Double Cattle Trough; 51.51817°N 0.10136°W | | 1881 | A double cattle trough with a human drinking fountain at one end, and a dog trough underneath. It is situated atop four granite blocks with rounded granite bollards against these on the road elevation. The trough was erected by the Metropolitan Drinking Fountain and Cattle Trough Association in memory of Philip Twells. |
| Ramp; 51.51821°N 0.10117°W | | 1862–65 | The circular ramp is at the centre of West Smithfield and provides access to the underground goods yard of Smithfield Central Market, it also defines the boundary of Smithfield Rotunda Garden. It comprises a ten metre wide road that descends in a spiral pattern from an entrance with a wooden kiosk and entrance barrier. Its construction is of granite setts with a narrow pavement on the inner side, whilst the side walls are of stock brick. The walls are topped with brick and ashlar low walls and railings of 20th-century origin. |
| Founders' Hall Including 39-40 Bartholomew Close; 51.51918°N 0.09894°W | | 1984–90 | Modern five storey livery hall for the Worshipful Company of Founders, of a reinforced concrete frame face in brick- the first three floors of brown brick, and the upper of buff brick. The entrance to the hall is at the northern end of the west elevation, this consists of darkwood doors with the company's coat of arms mounted on a jetty above. |
