= Sarah Ann Mountain =

British coach and inn proprietor (1769/70 – 1842)

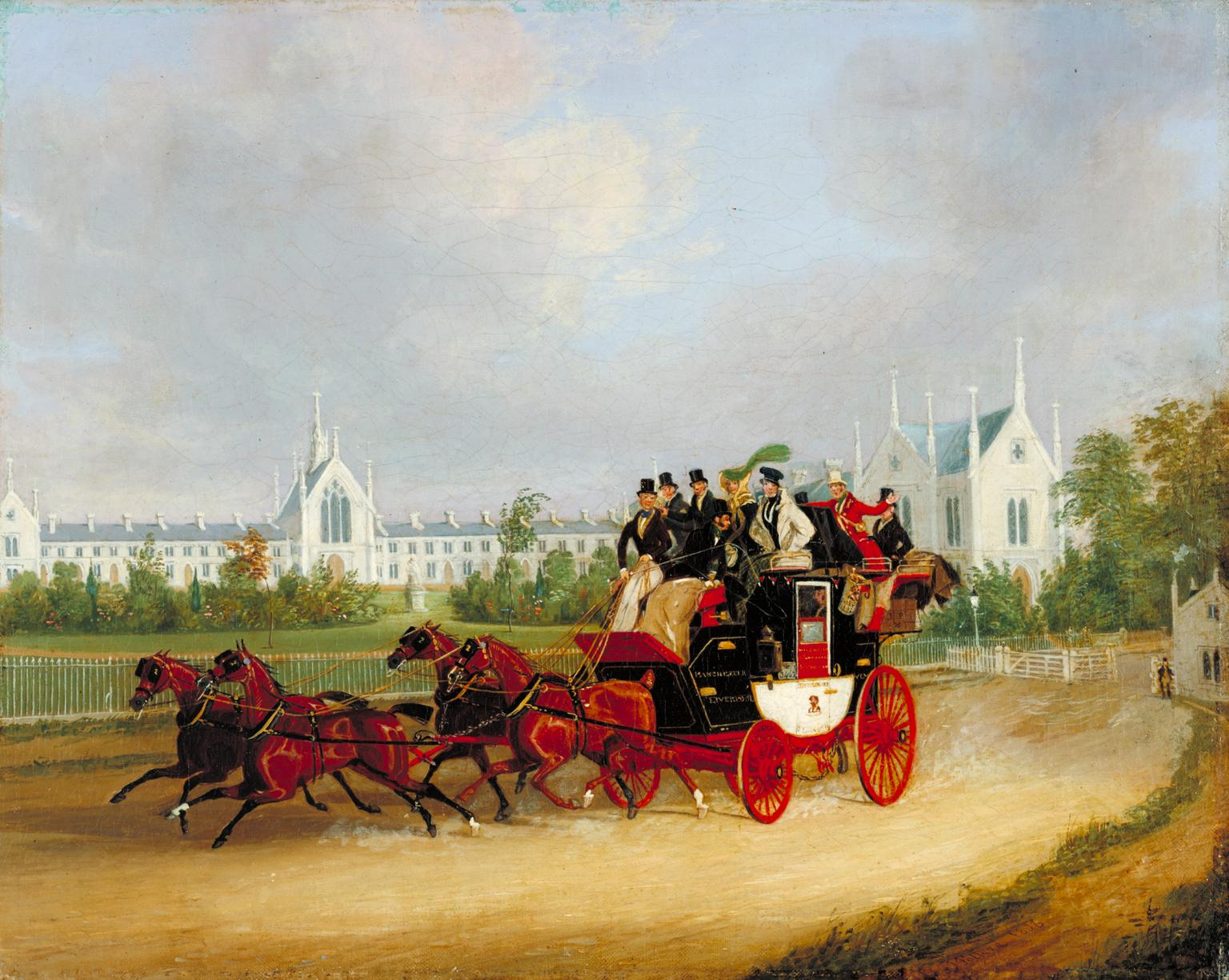
- Mountain's Tally-Ho passing Whittington College almshouse in 1836 en route to Birmingham by James Pollard
- Born: c.1770
- Died: 8 February 1842; Croydon
- Occupations: Stagecoach, mail and inn operator
- Known for: running the Saracen's Head
- Spouse: Butler William Mountain
- Children: >6

Sarah Ann Mountain (1769/70 – 8 February 1842) was a British coach, mail and inn proprietor. She ran the Saracen's Head and the last coach from Bristol to London.

== Early life and career ==
She was born in the United Kingdom around 1770 and by 1790 she was married to Butler William Mountain who was about ten years older than her. Her husband's family ran the Swan with Two Necks coaching inn and by 1808 they owned the Saracen's Head in Snow Hill, London.

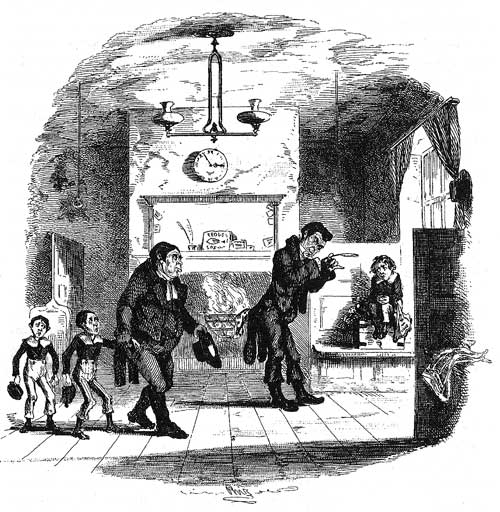
Wackford Squeers at the Saracen's Head (from Nicholas Nickleby

In February 1818, Mountain's husband died aged 59 and she became the sole owner and operator of the business. Her son Peter claimed to have operated the business after his father died, but he would have been fifteen and over sixty years later she was remembered as a "very noted and spirited female coach and mail proprietor". In 1823, she started the "Tally-Ho" service to Birmingham which aroused jealousy from her competitors. William Horne's "Independent Tally-Ho" set off an hour and a quarter earlier and the "Tally-ho" name was applied to several rival stagecoaches.

By 1827, Mountain's son, Peter, was acting as the manager of the business. The business made coaches on site, operated fifteen coaches every day and they had 200 horses. She hired the coaches she made to other businesses and they would pay her 3.5 pennies per mile. This was not the largest coaching business, but it was a middle ranking one. The business was particularly known for operating stagecoaches to Birmingham and Leeds which were known as Mountain's Tally-Ho and the Rockingham. The Tally-Ho would leave at 7:45 and take eleven hours to reach the Swan Hotel in Birmingham.

Mountain tried to keep her stage coaches running as long as possible, despite the growing competition from railways. The last coach to transport people between Bristol and London was part owned by Mountain.

Mountain was living at the Saracen's Head in 1839. Charles Dickens's Nicholas Nickleby was serialised in 1838/9 and the Saracen's Head is mentioned in the story. Mountain died in Croydon in 1842 leaving her business to her son, Peter.

== Family life ==
She and her husband had more than six children between 1790 and 1812.
