= Swan with Two Necks, London =

Former coaching inn in London

Coordinates: 51.5158°N 0.0936°W

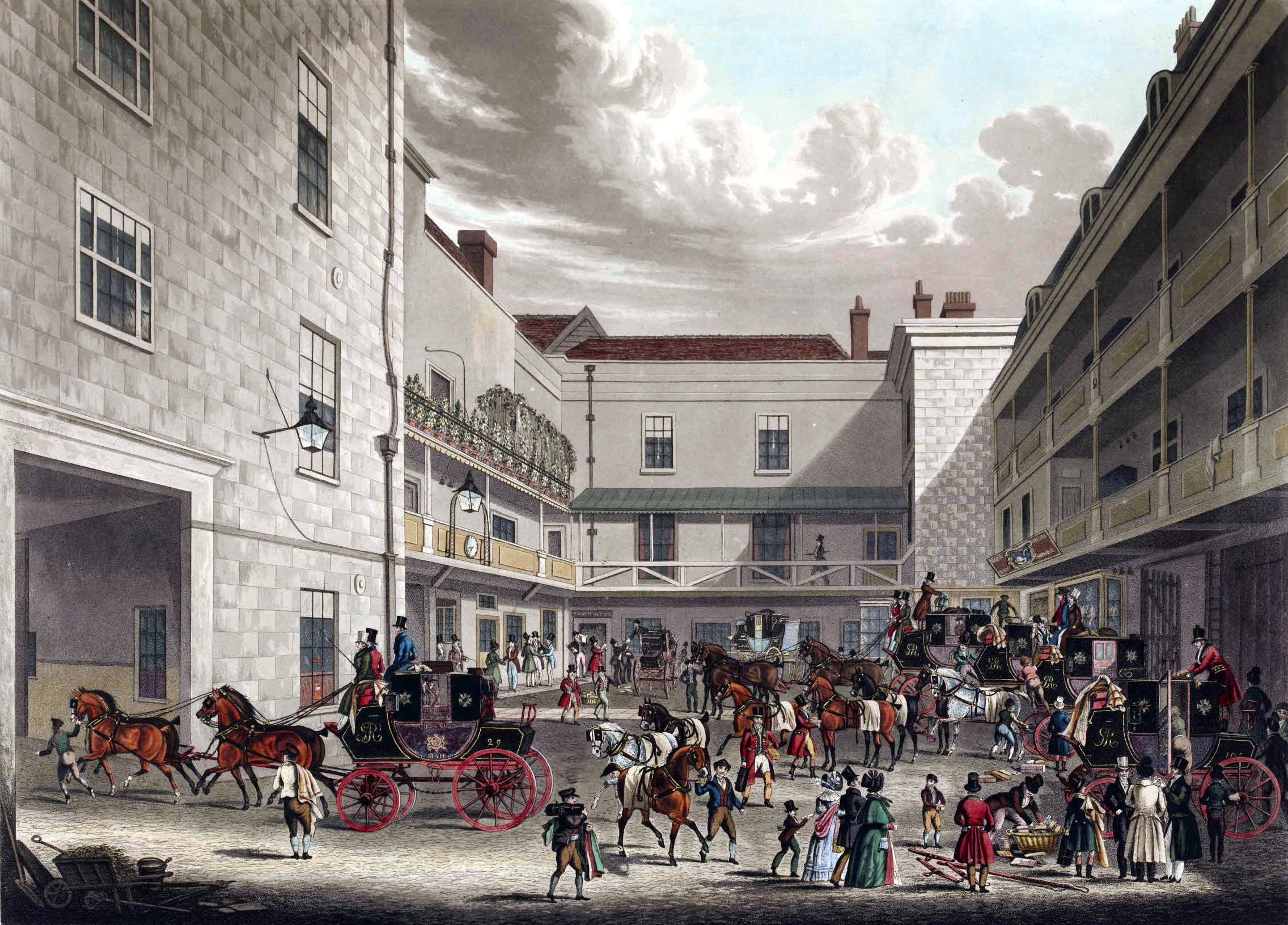
The Swan with Two Necks. Engraved by F. Rosenberg after a painting by James Pollard. Published by J. Watson, London, 1831.

The Swan with Two Necks was a coaching inn in the City of London that, until the arrival of the railways, was one of the principal departure points for travel to the north of England from London. Its site was given over in the early 1860s to a goods and parcels depot for a firm of railway agents and carriers.

== Location ==
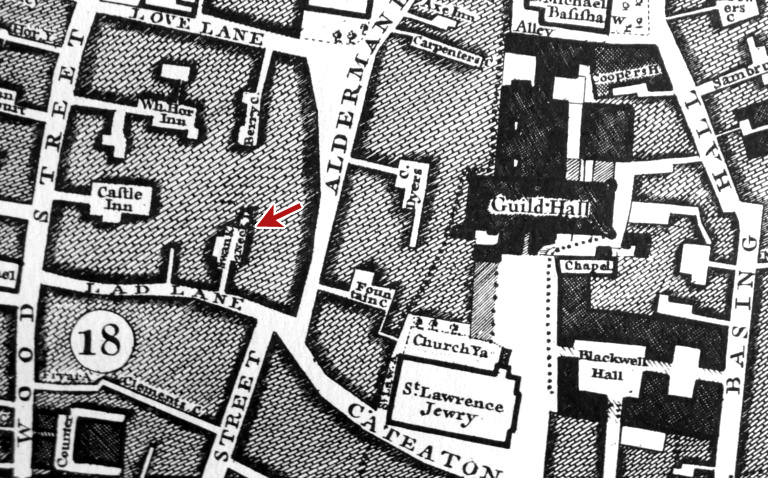
The Swan with Two Necks on John Rocque's map of 1746 (centre, arrowed).

The Swan stood in a courtyard on the northern side of Lad Lane, near the junction with Milk Street, Aldermanbury, and Cateaton Street. Lad Lane and Cateaton Street were among four streets amalgamated into Gresham Street in 1845.

== History ==
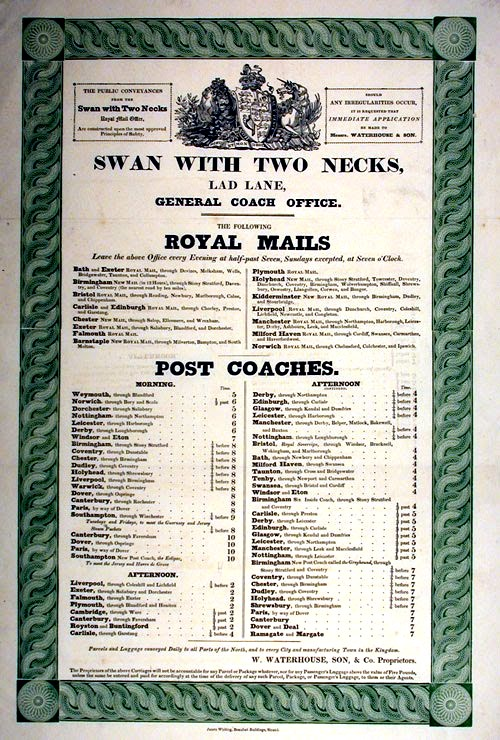
Timetable of coach departures. n.d.

Rather than being ringed, swans' bills would be annually nicked, in swan upping, using a metal implement, a practice reflected in the pub name The Swan with Two Necks, a corruption of "The Swan with Two Nicks".

Until the arrival of the railways, the Swan was one of the principal departure points for travel to the north of England from London. John Taylor stated in his Carriers Coſmographie (1637) that "The Carriers of Mancheſter, doe alſo lodge at the two neck’d Swan in Lad lane (betweene great Woodſtreet, and Milk-ſtreet end) they come every ſecond Thurſday: alſo there do lodge Carriers that doe paſſe through divers other parts of Lancaſhire."

In 1772 William Mountain was admitted into the Innkeepers company as he kept the Swan with Two Necks. His son Butler William Mountain and his wife Sarah Ann Mountain would also be noted innkeepers of the Saracen's Head, Snow Hill. In 1776, the Mohawk Chief Joseph Brant resided at the inn during negotiations on bringing the Iroquois Confederacy into the American Revolutionary War.

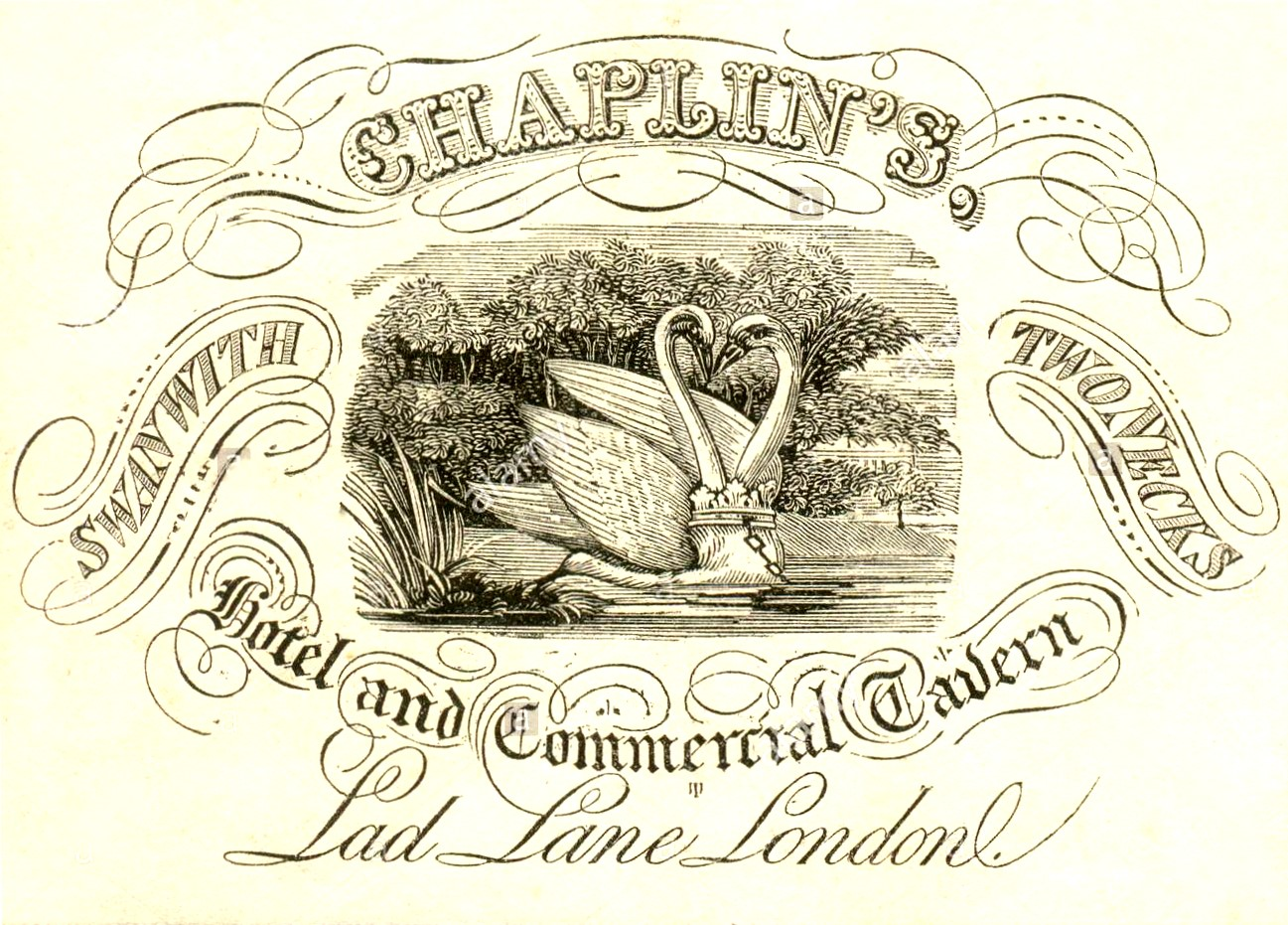
Chaplin's Swan with Two Necks Hotel and Commercial Tavern Lad Lane London

Around 1835 the Swan came into the ownership of the Kentish coachman William Chaplin (1787-?) who built up a large coaching business that by then used 1,200 horses. By 1835 he was running 68 coaches using 1,800 horses and employing 2,000 men. Among the other inns he owned were the Spread Eagle, Gracechurch Street, the Cross Keys, and the White Horse, Fetter Lane. He has been called "perhaps the greatest coach proprietor that ever lived".

Chaplin sold most of his horses, however, to invest in the railways and the inn at the Swan closed around 1860. It was replaced by a new building that functioned as a goods and parcels depot for Chaplin & Horne railway agents and carriers. The British Almanac of 1862 reported that:

One of the most remarkable recent buildings in the City for its size and constructive features occupies the site of the well-known Swan-with-two-Necks, in Gresham Street. It is built for Messrs. Chaplin and Horne, the railway carriers, and has a frontage of nearly 100 feet, a depth of 150 feet, and a height of 64 feet above the pavement, while beneath are warehouses and extensive stabling. The front has a solid architectural character, in keeping with the purposes to which the building is to be applied. The ground floor, of Portland stone, rusticated, rests on a granite basement, while the three upper stories are of brick with stone dressings, a massive cornice crowning the whole. The architect was Mr. W. Tite, M.P.; the cost has been a little under 40,000l.

A trade directory for 1869 listed the site as "the Receiving Office for Goods for the Great Eastern, London & South Western, South Eastern, London, Brighton & South Coast & London, Chatham & Dover Railway Companies." Advertising for Chaplin & Horne from 1874 indicates that the site continued to be known as the Swan-with-two-Necks but that it was only one of many depots run by the firm. Chaplin & Horne were in competition with Pickfords for much of the nineteenth century and Pickfords eventually took over Chaplin & Horne and the Swan at 57 Gresham Street became a Pickfords depot and their head office.

== See also ==
- Blossom's Inn
