= Dorset Street =

Dorset Street may refer to:

- Dorset Street (Spitalfields), London, the site of the murder of Mary Jane Kelly by Jack the Ripper
- Dorset Street, Dublin, Ireland
- Dorset Street, Marylebone, London, part of the Portman Estate
