= Chiswell Street =

Street in London, England

Coordinates: 51°31′14.7″N 0°5′23.8″W

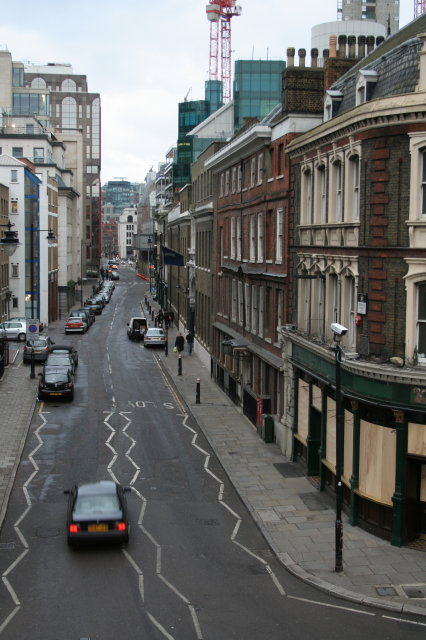
Chiswell Street looking east

Chiswell Street is in the London Borough of Islington. It includes several listed buildings, including the Whitbread Brewery. In 1217 the name of the street was Chyselstrate, after the Old English word for pebble.

== Location ==
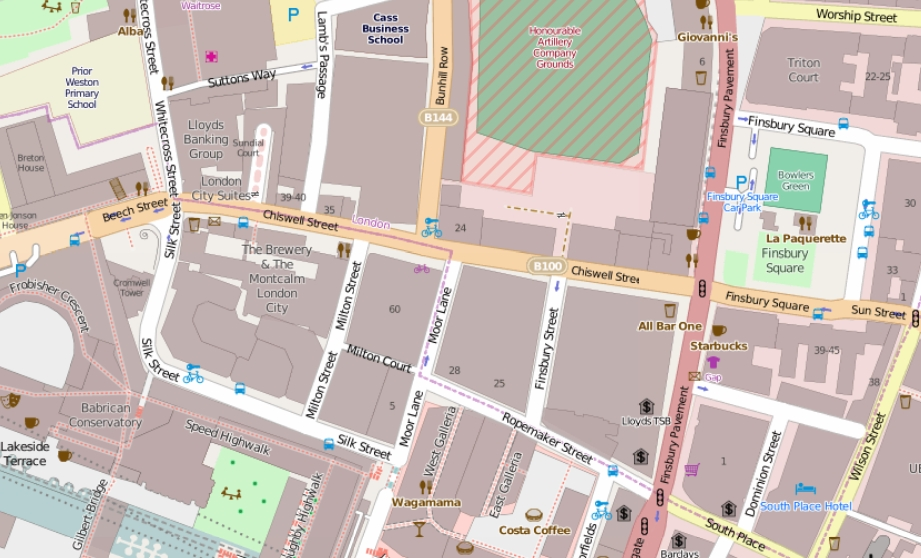
The immediate vicinity of Chiswell Street

The street, in St Luke's, Islington, runs east-west and forms part of the B100 road. At the west end it becomes Beech Street, with Silk Street running from the south of that junction, and Whitecross Street heading north. At its east end it meets Finsbury Square. The western junction marks the boundary of the City of London with the London Borough of Islington: Whitecross Street and Chiswell Street (north and east) are in Islington, while Beech Street and Silk Street (west and south) are in the City.

== Whitbread Brewery ==
The southern block between Silk Street and Milton Street (once Grub Street) is occupied by the Grade II-listed Whitbread Brewery building. In 1750, Samuel Whitbread consolidated production from two smaller breweries, the Goat Brewhouse, where porter was produced, and a brewery in Brick Lane used to produce pale ale and amber ale, on a much larger site. The new Brewery was also built on the site of an older one, the Kings Head Brewhouse. Considerable expansion followed, including the North Yard across the street, and beer was brewed here for 225 years, until the Whitbread Brewery closed in 1976. Part of the complex is now The Brewery, a conference and events venue, and part of it the Montcalm London City Hotel.

== Other buildings ==
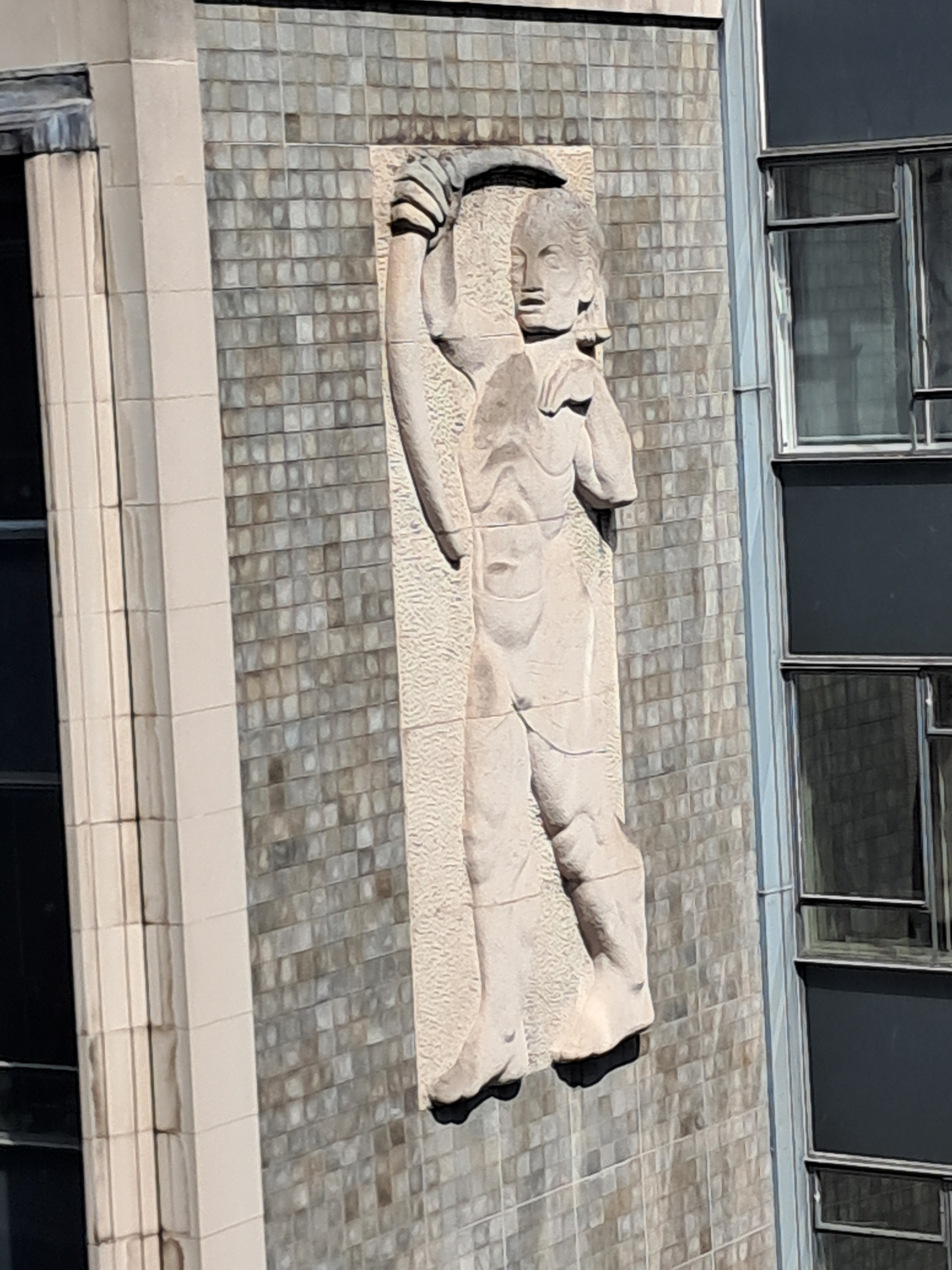
The Chiswell Archer, Longbow House, viewed from Ropemaker Place

Associated with the Brewery, The Jugged Hare pub at No. 49, on the corner with Silk Street, is Grade II listed. Also adjoined to the Brewery, The Chiswell Street Dining Rooms at No. 56 used to be St Paul's Tavern until the pub closed in 2008. It is also a Grade II listed building, dating back to the mid-late 18th century. The Brewery's North Yard and surrounding buildings on the north side (at Sundial Court, 1774 wooden sundial face retained), is now used as a hotel and as a hall of residence for the nearby Guildhall School of Music.

No. 39-40 Chiswell Street, on the corner of Lamb's Passage, has a retained facade from an earlier building. Nearby Templeton House, 33-34 Chiswell Street (before 1999 known as Diana House), originally had its entrance adorned by an Arthur Fleischmann sculpture, Diana and the Hounds (1953), commissioned by architect Hans Biel. During the 1999 renovation the artwork mysteriously vanished, presumed stolen.

Longbow House at Nos. 14-20 on the north side is an office building designed by Joseph & F. Milton Cashmore & Partners in the 1950s. The name commemorates the archery practice that used to take place in the Artillery Ground from the 14th century onwards, which the building overlooks at the rear. On its facade there is a relief sculpture, the Chiswell Archer. The Chiswell Street entrance to the Artillery Ground is further east at Finsbury Street.

To the east of the Brewery on the south side, three giant office blocks dominate the street. Between Milton Street and Moor Lane is Milton Gate (60, Chiswell Street), an extensive re-development by Allford Hall Monaghan Morris of a 1990 office building, one of the last to be designed by Sir Denys Lasdun. Between Moor Lane and Finsbury Street is the back of Ropemaker Place, a 21-storey office complex designed by Arup Associates and completed in May 2009. After Finsbury Street is Finsbury Dials (20 Finsbury Street), designer Stiff + Trevillion, another re-development of a late 1980s office building.

On the corner of Chiswell Street and Finsbury Pavement is a sculpture by Stephen Cox, Faceted Column (1999).

== Notable residents ==
Explorer Sir Samuel White Baker was born at the family home in Chiswell Street in 1821.

William Caslon's Caslon Type Foundry was based on Chiswell Street for two hundred years, from 1737 to 1909. There is a blue plaque. The plaque was originally installed in 1958 at Friendly House, 21-23 Chiswell Street, demolished in the 1980s.

Richard Cecil, Evangelical Anglican clergyman, was born in Chiswell Street on 8 November 1748.

The architect George Dance the Elder lived in Chiswell Street, where his son George Dance the Younger was born in 1741, living there until 1755.

James Lackington opened his first bookshop at 46 Chiswell Street in 1775 and was there until 1794, when he moved to the much larger Temple of the Muses in Finsbury Square.

George Smith the 18th century cricketer and groundkeeper of the Artillery Ground, was also the landlord of the Pyed Horse Inn (at 3 Chiswell Street from the 1730s, demolished in the 1930s), through which admittance to the Artillery Ground was at one time compulsory.
