= Sydney Perks =

English architect (1864–1944)

Sydney Perks FRIBA FSA
- Born: January 2, 1864; Westminster, London, England
- Died: November 2, 1944 (aged 80); Sevenoaks, Kent, England
- Occupations: Architect and surveyor
- Notable work: Fruit and Wool Exchange; Snow Hill Police Station

Sydney Perks FRIBA FSA (2 January 1864 – 2 November 1944) was an English architect and surveyor. He is best known for designing London's Fruit and Wool Exchange and Snow Hill Police Station, and for his restoration work on the London Guildhall and Mansion House.

== Life and work ==
Sydney Perks was born on 2 January 1864 in the City of Westminster to Charles Perks and Emily Marian Perks (née Warner) as one of eight children, and was baptised at St Martin-in-the-Fields in Westminster on 22 January. Sydney's father worked as a stationer, and the family lived at 110 St Martin's Lane, Westminster. By 1871, Sydney and five of his siblings (Emily, Frank, Annie, Walter and Marian) lived with their parents and two domestic servants at Soho Lodge on All Farthing Lane, Wandsworth, London. In the 1881 census, Sydney is listed as a scholar, and his mother was a widow. Sydney is first listed as an architect in the 1891 census.

Sydney Perks attended King's College School, and studied architecture under T. H. Watson, specialising in surveying.

He was elected an associate of the Surveyors' Institution in 1887, and a fellow in 1903.

Sydney Perks was Surveyor to the City of London from 1905 until 1931. In his capacity as city surveyor, Perks had regularly ascended the Fire Monument and used a plumb bob to measure its straightness, and monitored cracks in the Tower of London which expand and contract with changing weather conditions.

He became a Freemason on 20 February 1906, being the first initiate of the Guildhall Lodge No. 3116, which met at De Keyser's Royal Hotel on Victoria Embankment, London.

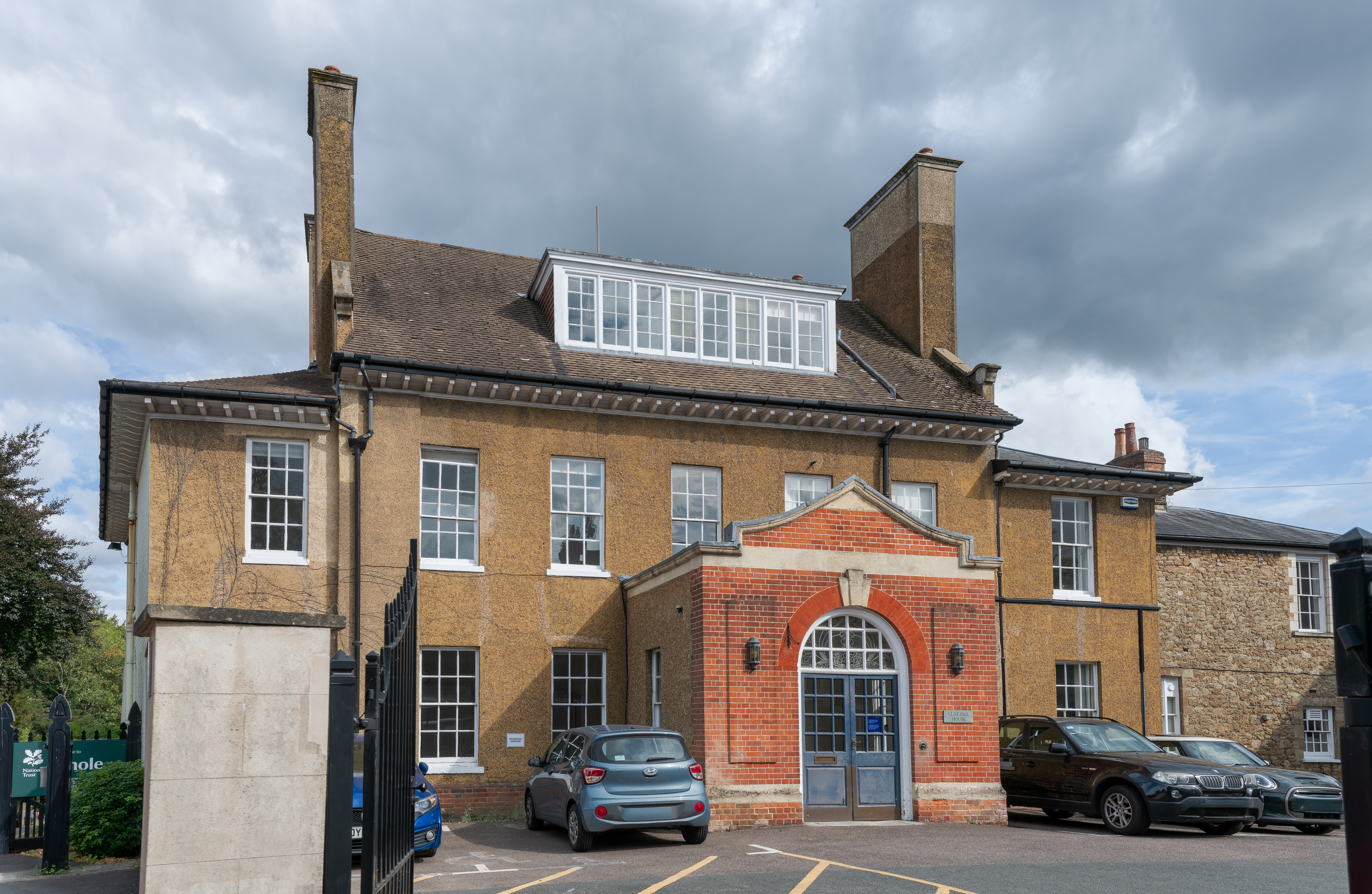
Claridge House in Sevenoaks, where Sydney Perks lived until his death. It is now part of the Sevenoaks School.

Sydney Perks was the architect responsible for the 1910 restoration of the Guildhall in the City of London.

The 1912 Gresham College building on Gresham Street was constructed to designs by Sydney Perks and Dendy Watney.

He designed the 1925 Dron House estate, on Adelina Grove in Whitechapel, for the City of London Corporation. The estate was built to house people displaced by the expansion of Smithfield Market.

Sydney Perks designed the 1926 Snow Hill Police Station for the City of London Police. The police station was operational until 2020 when it was sold to hotel company Whitbread due to low footfall.

Sydney Perks also designed the 1929 Fruit and Wool Exchange in Spitalfields, which functioned as a fruit and vegetable market until 1991, and later housed multiple small businesses until it was controversially demolished in 2015 to be redeveloped into offices. The original facade designed by Perks was preserved and incorporated into the new building, which was completed in 2018.

Perks wrote a number of books about the history of architecture in London, and spoke before the Royal Society of Arts.

Sydney Perks died aged 80 on 2 November 1944 at his home, Claridge House, in Sevenoaks, Kent.

Buildings designed by Sydney Perks

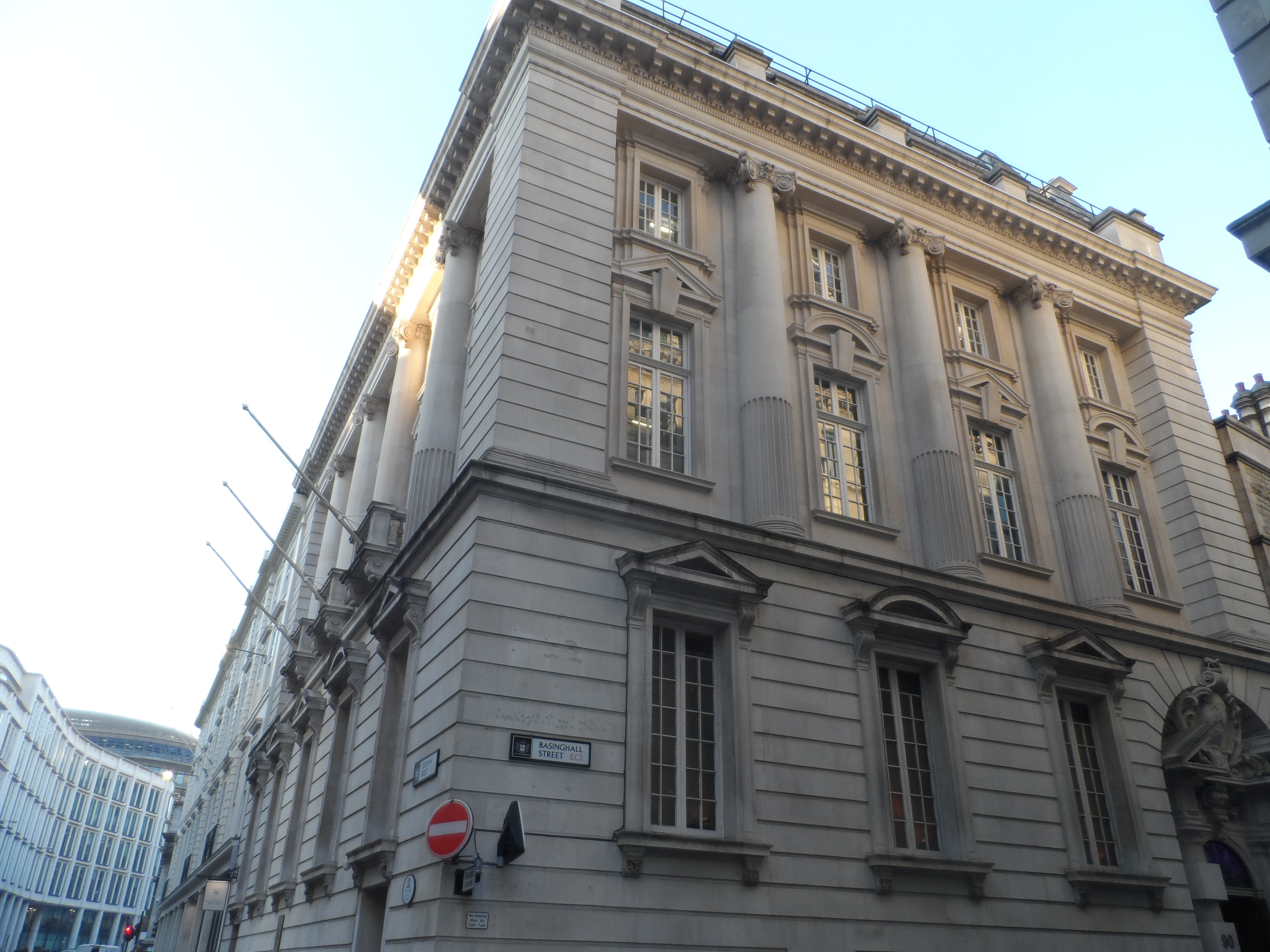
Gresham College building (1912)

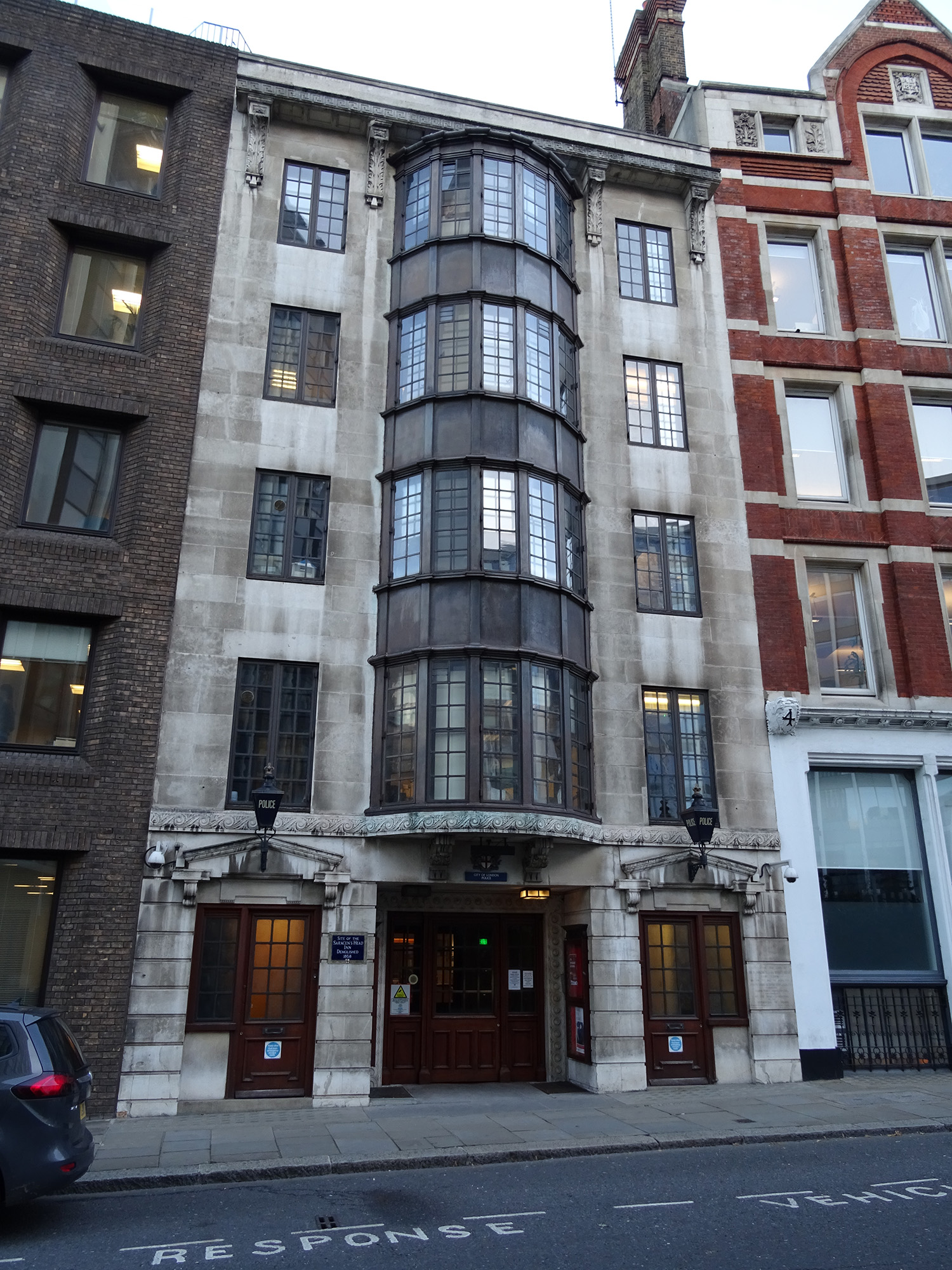
Snow Hill Police Station (1926)

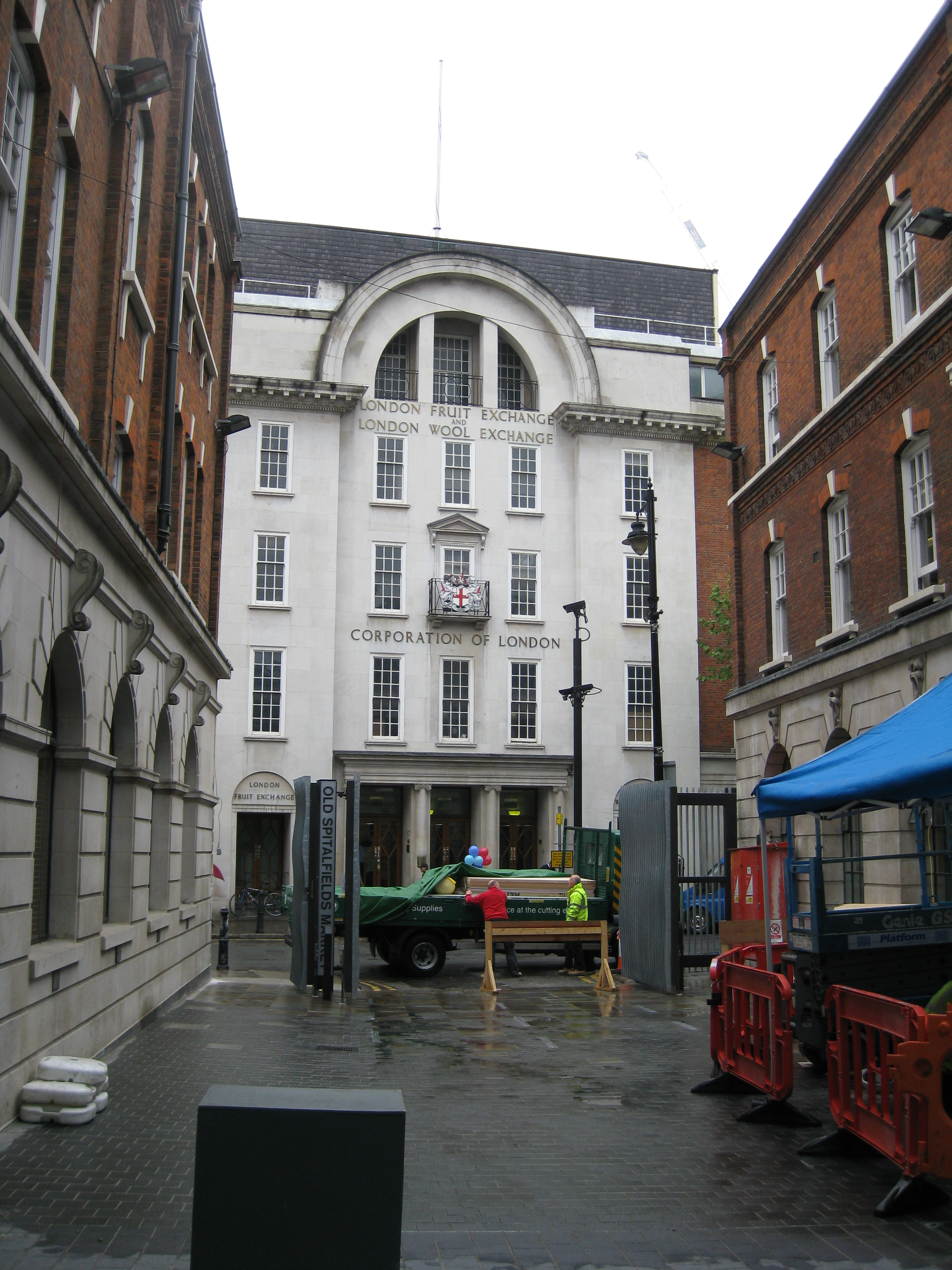
London Fruit and Wool Exchange (1929)

== Notable publications ==
- Residential Flats of All Classes (1905)
- The Restoration and Recent Discoveries at the Guildhall, London (1910)
- The History of the Mansion House (1922)
- Essays on Old London (1927)
- The Water Line of the City of London after the Great Fire (1935)
