= Fruit and Wool Exchange =

Former market in London

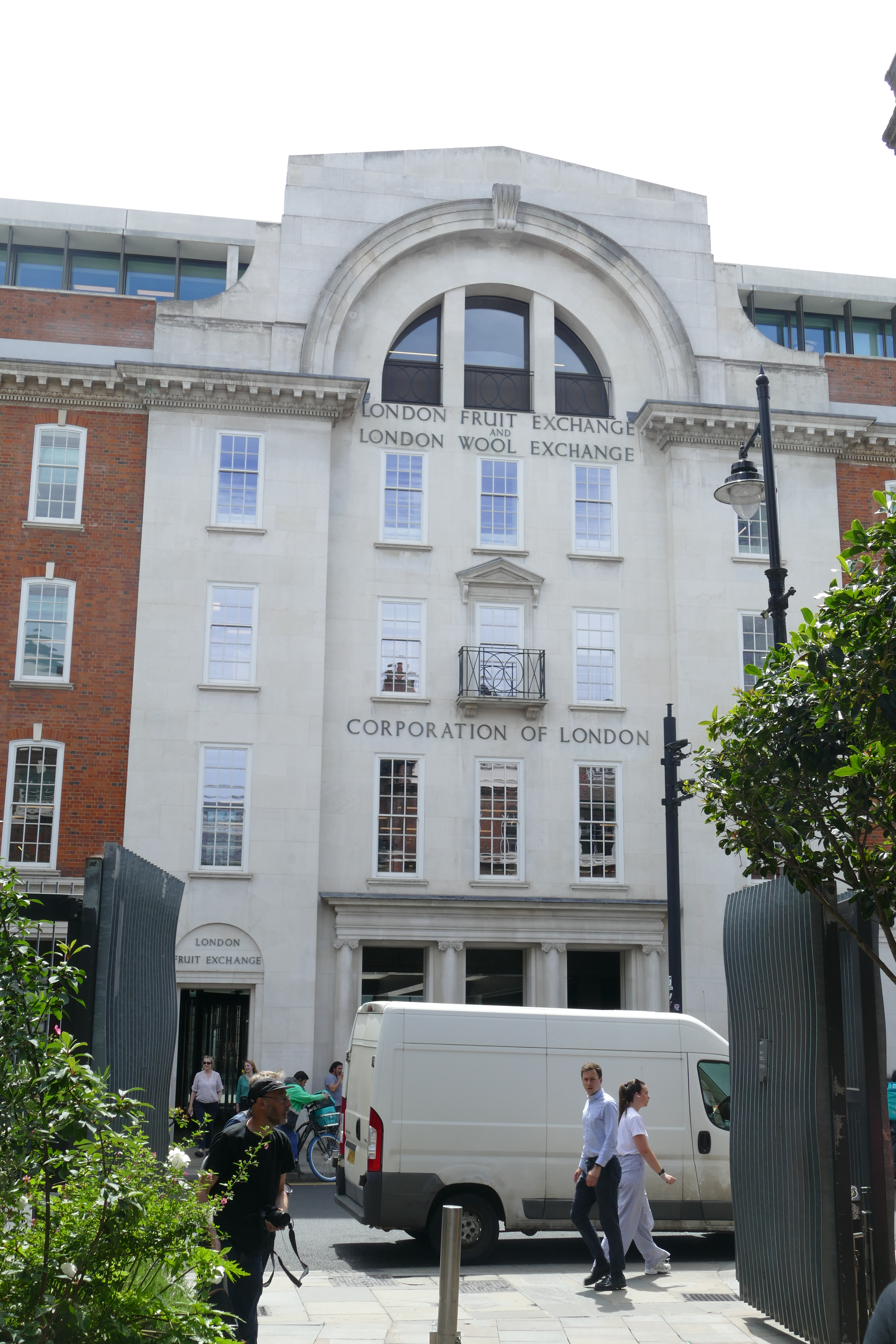
- Preserved facade of the Fruit and Wool Exchange Building in 2024, viewed from Old Spitalfields Market
- Interactive map of the Fruit and Wool Exchange area

General information
- Location: 1-10 Brushfield Street, Spitalfields, London E1 6EN
- Coordinates: 51.5189°N 0.0754°W
- Inaugurated: 30 October 1929
- Closed: 1991 (as wholesale market)
- Demolished: 2015 (facade preserved, redevelopment completed 2018)

Design and construction
- Architect: Sydney Perks

The Fruit and Wool Exchange was an exchange market in Spitalfields, London. Opened in 1929, it served as a distribution centre for produce that arrived through the Port of London. The building ceased to function as a fruit and vegetable market in 1991, and was redeveloped into offices between 2015 and 2018.

== History ==
Designed by Sydney Perks and completed in 1929, the building's facade is built of brick and Portland Stone, with sash windows. The building was officially opened by the Lord Mayor of London, Sir Kynaston Studd, on 30 October 1929.

The building housed two separate exchanges: the London Fruit Exchange, and the London Wool Exchange. The London Wool Exchange was under the control of the Associated London Selling Wool Brokers (ALSWB) which consisted of nine firms. The London Fruit Exchange was established by the four main auction fruit brokers in London, in conjunction with the Central Markets Committee of the Corporation of London, and held its first auction here in September 1929.

During the Second World War, the basement of the exchange building was used as a bomb shelter during the Blitz.

The building ceased to function as a fruit and vegetable market in 1991 with the opening of New Spitalfields Market. Afterwards the building housed many small businesses until its redevelopment.

=== Redevelopment ===
In March 2012, Tower Hamlets Borough Council unanimously rejected proposals to demolish and redevelop the exchange building, but in October the council's decision was overruled by the Mayor of London, Boris Johnson. The small businesses based in the building were given until the end of November to vacate the premises. The redevelopment plans were opposed by many conservationists including historian Dan Cruickshank, and in 2013 the conservation group Save Britain's Heritage unsuccessfully appealed to English Heritage to have the building listed. In 2015 the building was purchased by M&G Real Estate and demolition work began.

The redevelopment was carried out by civil engineering company Sir Robert McAlpine and completed in April 2018. The front facade on Brushfield Street was preserved and incorporated into the new office building. The original building was demolished, along with some neighbouring businesses including The Gun public house, as well as a 1960s multi-storey car park to the rear. The rearward extension of the site also eradicated Dorset Street, where Jack the Ripper had murdered his final victim Mary Jane Kelly in Miller's Court, which had itself been demolished to make way for the building of the Fruit and Wool Exchange.

== Gallery ==
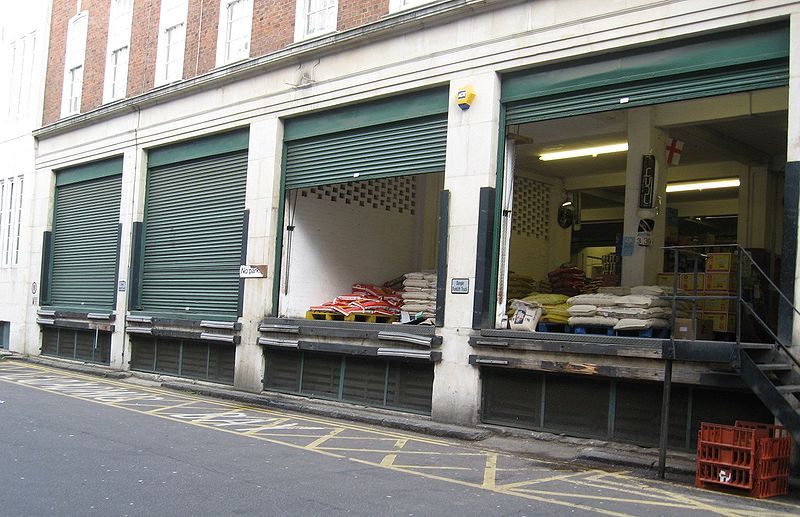
Former loading bays on the now-eradicated Dorset Street

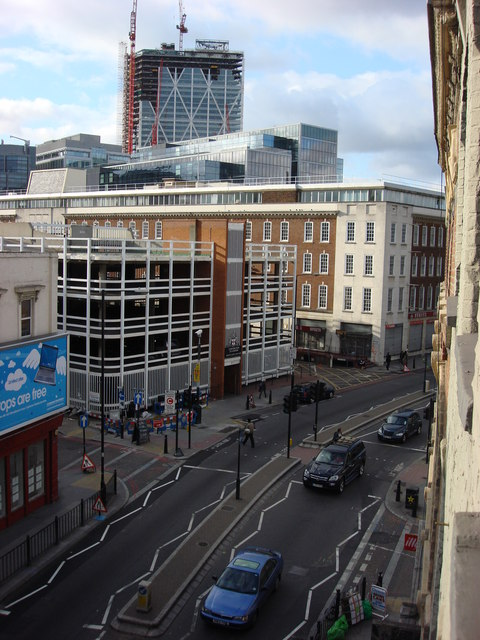
Rear of the old exchange building and multi-storey car park, both demolished to make room for the new office building

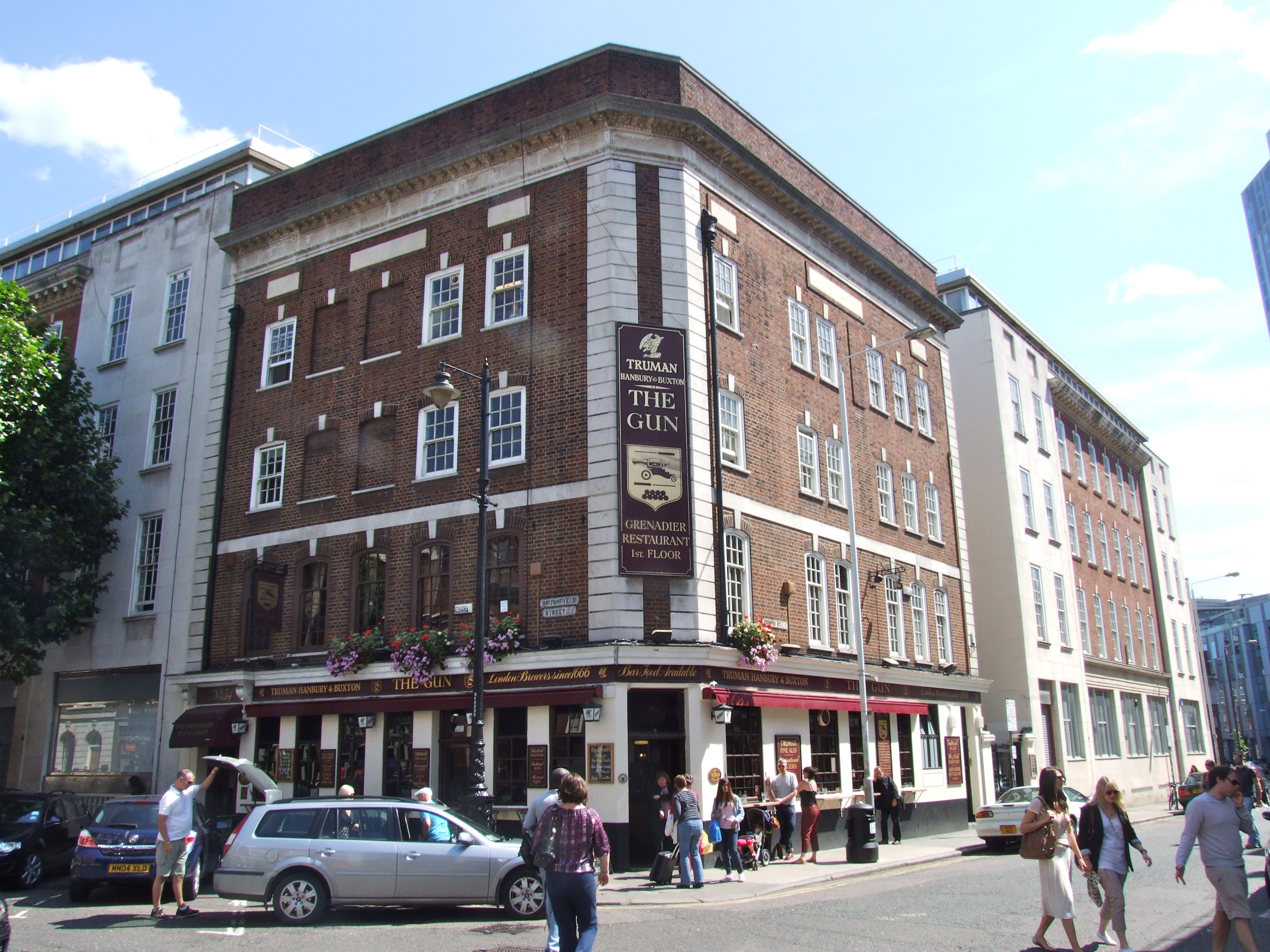
The Gun pub on the northwest corner of the exchange, demolished as part of the redevelopment

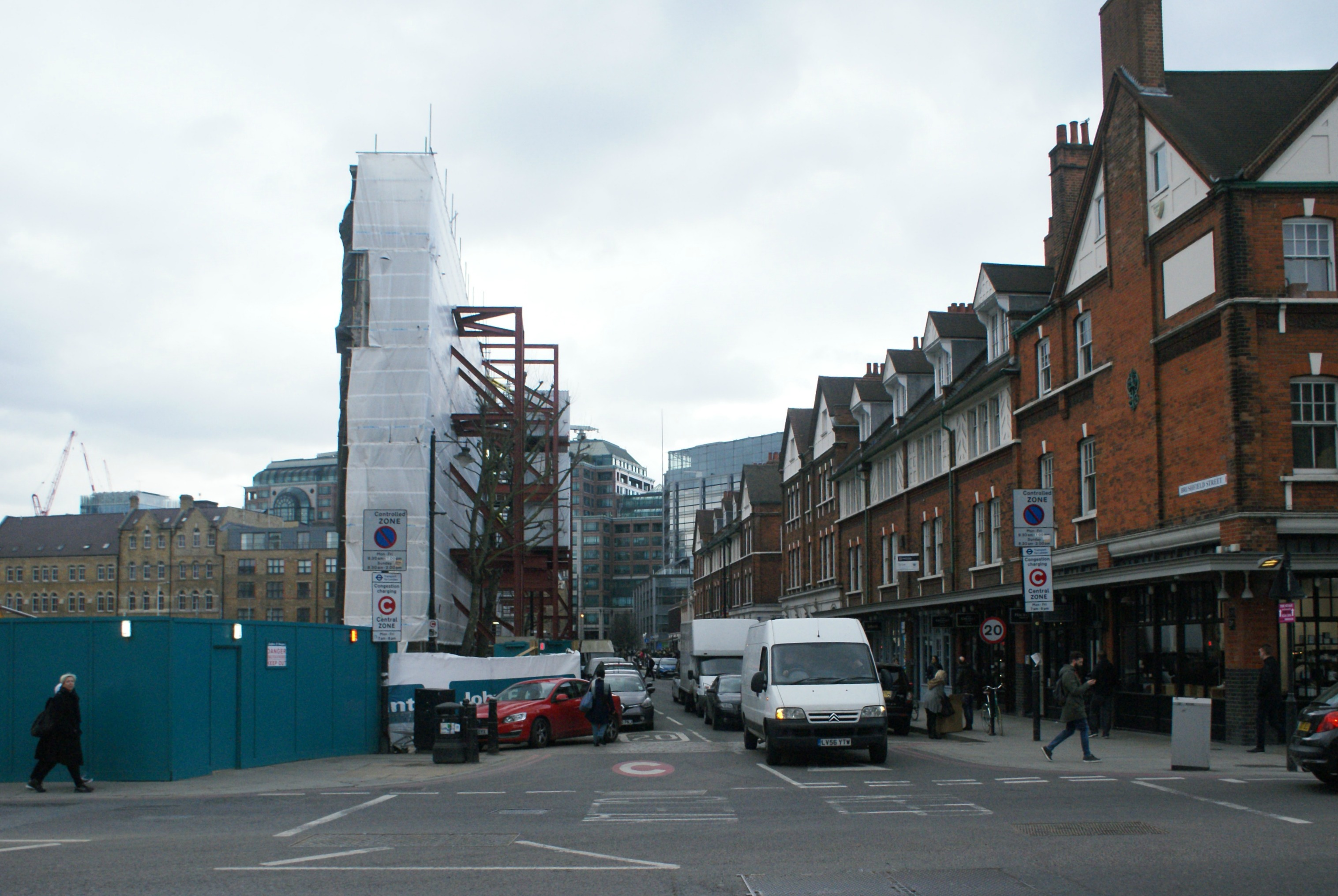
The retained facade (left) after the demolition, as seen in 2016
