= Dorset Street (Spitalfields) =

Former street in London

Coordinates: 51.518763°N 0.075040°W

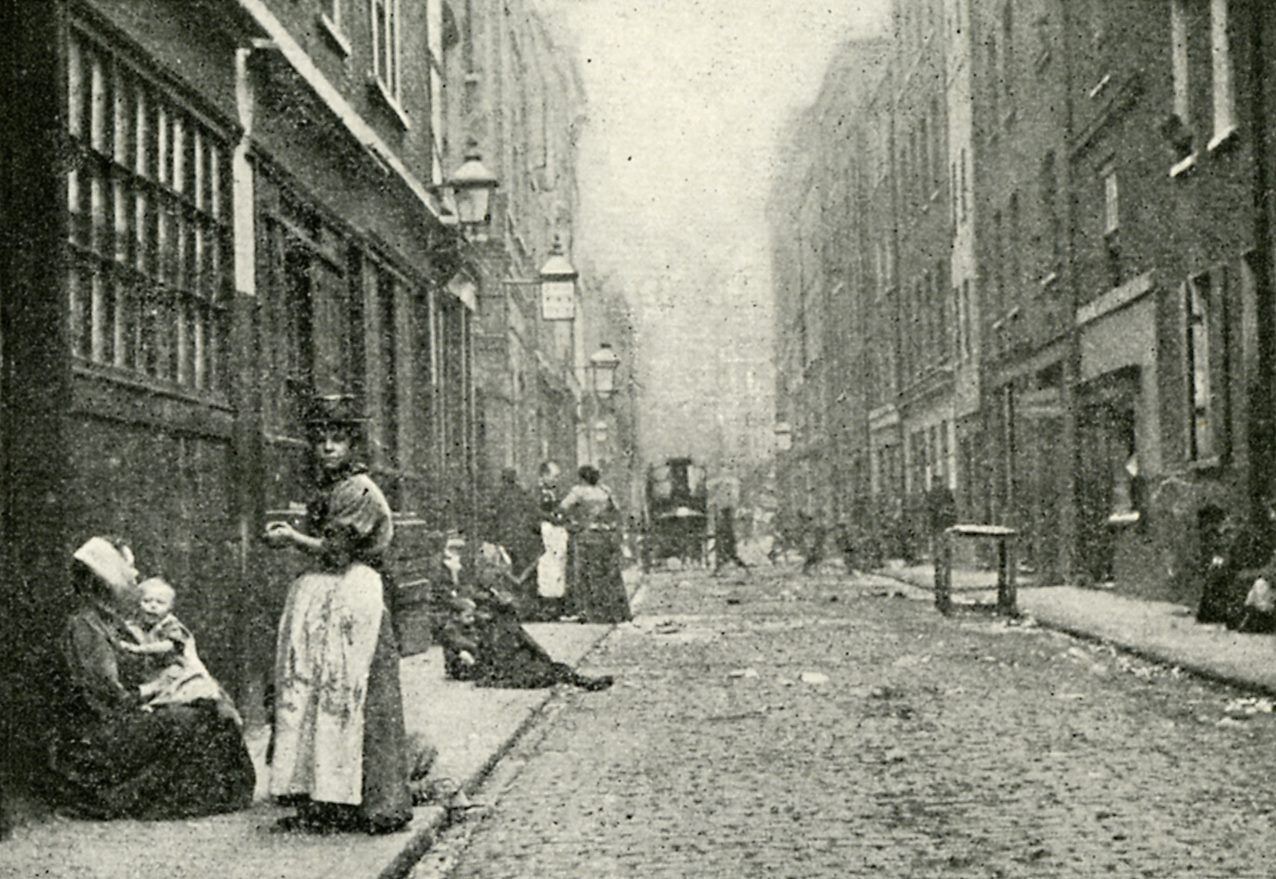
Dorset Street photographed in 1902 and used in Jack London's book The People of the Abyss. The camera is at the western end of the road, pointing east: Miller's Court was on the left-hand side at the far end.

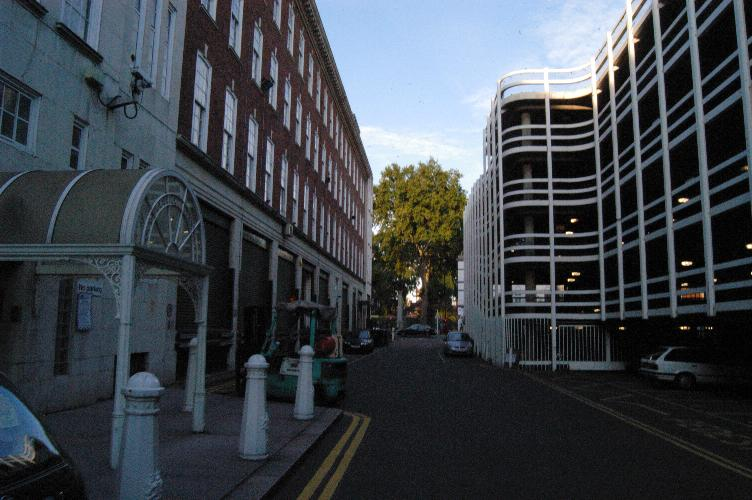
The site of Dorset Street in 2006, again looking west to east. Miller's Court was located on the left side of this photograph.

Dorset Street, originally known as Datchet Street, was a street in Spitalfields, East London, once situated at the heart of the area's rookery. By repute it was "the worst street in London", and it was the scene of the brutal murder of Mary Jane Kelly by Jack the Ripper on 9 November 1888. The murder was committed at Kelly's lodgings which were situated at No. 13, Miller's Court, entered from a passageway between 26 and 27, Dorset Street.

The road was renamed Duval Street in 1904, before having its north side demolished in 1928 during the rebuilding of Old Spitalfields Market, and the buildings on the south side replaced by a car park in the 1960s. The site was built over during redevelopment of the Fruit and Wool Exchange in the 2010s.

== History ==
Laid out in 1674 and originally known as "Datchet Street" (probably from William Wheler of Datchet, who owned land in the area), it was given the name Dorset Street soon afterward. Locally, it was sometimes known as "Dosset Street" or "Dossen Street" either because of the large number of doss-houses it contained or because immigrants to the area found it hard to pronounce the original name. It was a short and narrow street, 400 feet long and 24 feet wide, running parallel with Brushfield Street to the north and with White's Row to the south, and connecting Crispin Street to the west with Commercial Street to the east. An alley called Little Paternoster Row connected Dorset Street with Brushfield Street. In the mid-nineteenth century a man named John Miller built some cottages in the back gardens of his properties at 26 and 27, on the north side of Dorset Street. This small area, entered by a passageway between 26 and 27, became known as Miller's Court. No. 13 Miller's Court, where Mary Jane Kelly resided and was murdered, was originally the back part of 26 Dorset Street, subsequently renumbered and let as a separate residence by her landlord Jack McCarthy, and looking out onto the cottage buildings in the Court rather than the original garden.

By the 1880s, Dorset Street was almost entirely taken up with common lodging-houses and other sub-standard rented accommodation, mostly let and controlled by two men, Jack McCarthy and William Crossingham. McCarthy and Crossingham were major slum landlords in this area and suspected to be involved in various illegal rackets, such as controlling prostitutes, fencing stolen goods, and arranging prize fights. Reportedly, the "lowest of all prostitutes" worked on Dorset Street, and some common lodging-houses were actually brothels.

Only two legitimate businesses were listed in the Post Office Street Directory for 1888: that of Barnett Price, who had a grocery store at No. 7, and the Blue Coat Boy public house, which was run by William James Turner at No. 32. It was estimated that on any one night there were no fewer than 1,200 men sleeping in Dorset Street's crowded lodging houses.

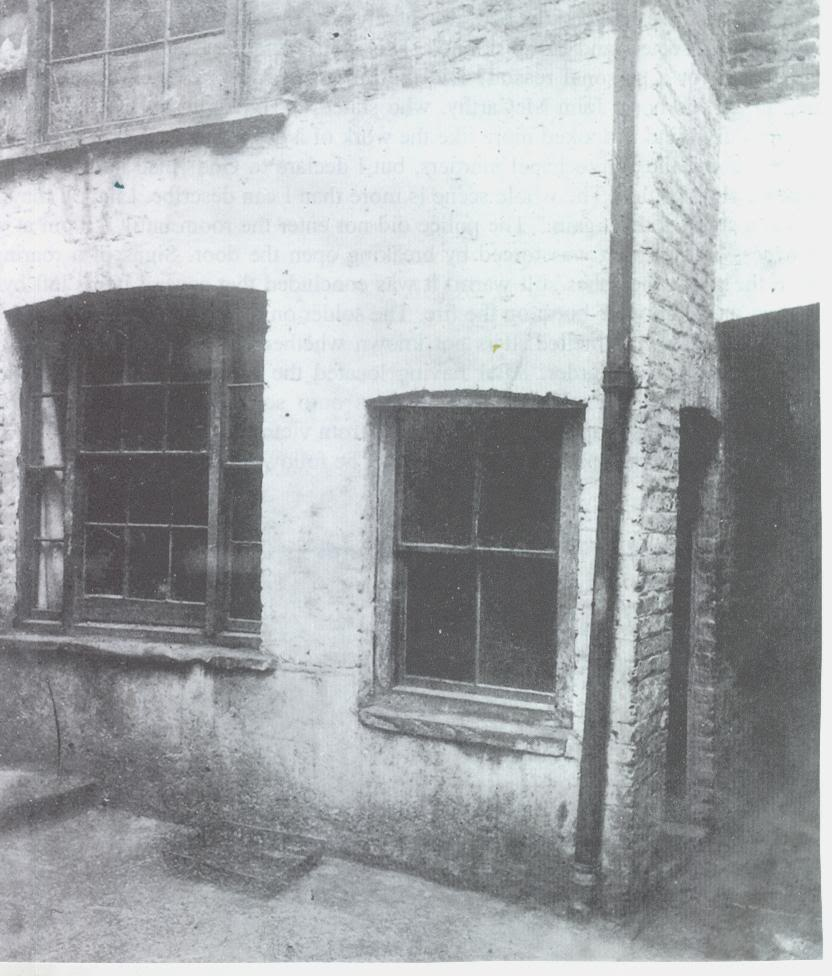
No. 13 Miller's Court in 1888

On the corner of Dorset and Commercial streets stood The Britannia public house. It was known as the "Ringers", after the landlord's surname; a frequent customer was Mary Jane Kelly. Opposite Miller's Court, at No. 15, was Crossingham's common lodging-house; another such, also owned by Crossingham, stood at the corner of Little Paternoster Row, at 35, Dorset Street. It was from this common lodging house that Ripper victim Annie Chapman was last seen walking up Little Paternoster Row, before turning right into Brushfield Street and heading towards Christ Church, Spitalfields.

In the Daily Mail in 1901, Frederick Arthur MacKenzie wrote of Dorset Street:

[It] has recently sprung into undesired notoriety. Here we have a place which boasts of an attempt at murder on an average once a month, of a murder in every house, and one house at least, a murder in every room. Policemen go down it as a rule in pairs. Hunger walks prowling in its alleyways, and the criminals of to-morrow are being bred there to-day… The lodging-houses of Dorset Street and of the district around are the head centres of the shifting criminal population of London. Of course, the aristocrats of crime – the forger, the counterfeiter, and the like do not come here. In Dorset Street we find more largely the common thief, the pickpocket, the area meak, the man who robs with violence, and the unconvicted murderer. The police have a theory, it seems, that it is better to let these people congregate together in one mass where they can easily be found than to scatter them abroad. And Dorset Street certainly serves the purpose of a police trap.

Dorset Street remained a notorious slum following the murder of Mary Jane Kelly. In 1901, Mary Ann Austin was murdered with ten wounds to her abdomen at Annie Chapman's former home, Crossingham's Lodging House, at 35, Dorset Street. Later, in 1909, there was a Jack the Ripper–like killing in No. 20, Miller's Court, the room directly above No. 13 (which had been occupied by Elizabeth Prater in 1888), when a young woman named Kitty Ronan was found with her throat cut. It was believed that Ronan was a prostitute, and, as in the killing of Mary Jane Kelly, her murderer was never found. As in 1888, the landlord of Miller's Court in 1909 was still John McCarthy. The last murder in Dorset Street was the gangland killing of a Soho club manager and a former middleweight boxer named Selwyn Cooney, in February 1960. Cooney was shot in the head at a drinking club on the street, after which he staggered down the stairs into the road and died.

A vivid description of crime and vice in Dorset Street is given in Ralph L. Finn's 1963 memoir of a Jewish boyhood in the East End:

It was a street of whores. There is, I always feel, a subtle difference between an whore and a prostitute. At least we used to think so. Prozzies were younger, and more attractive. Whores were debauched old bags. It teemed with nasty characters – desperate, wicked, lecherous, razor-slashing hoodlums. No Jews lived there. Only a few bold Choots had the temerity even to walk through it. There were pubs every few yards. Bawdy houses every few feet. It was peopled by roaring drunken fighting-mad killers.

=== "Worst street in London" ===
George Duckworth, investigating London poverty on behalf of Charles Booth in 1898, described Dorset Street as "the worst street I have seen so far, thieves, prostitutes, bullies, all common lodging houses". MacKenzie's 1901 article in the Daily Mail was titled "The Worst Street in London"; and the phrase reappeared in Jack London's book The People of the Abyss in 1903. Fiona Rule subsequently adopted it as the title of her 2008 book on the history of the street.

== Later history and redevelopment ==
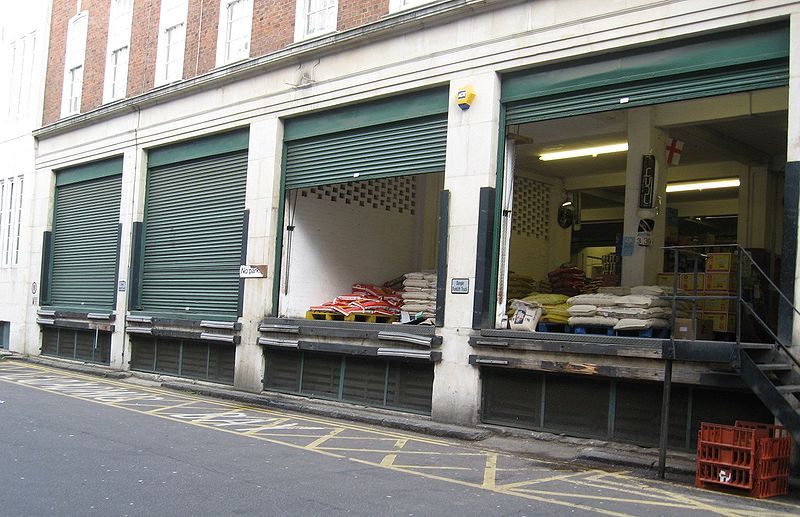
The former location of Miller's Court in Dorset Street (now redeveloped)

As Finn indicates, by the early years of the twentieth century Dorset Street constituted a small non-Jewish ghetto in what was now largely a Jewish area. Dorset Street was renamed "Duval Street" on 28 June 1904. In 1920, the Corporation of London purchased Spitalfields Market and began major rebuilding, which involved the demolition of the whole of the north side of Duval Street, including Miller's Court. The new fruit market opened in 1928. Another new market development in the 1960s resulted in Duval Street becoming a lorry park for the market. The buildings on the south side of Dorset Street were redeveloped as a multi-storey car park in 1969–1971. The north side was bounded by the London Fruit and Wool Exchange building, which in later years was used primarily as office space for small businesses and a storage warehouse for an import-export company.

Redevelopment of the Fruit and Wool Exchange in the 2010s saw the Dorset Street site built over. As part of the redevelopment, archaeological excavations were carried out in 2015–2016. These revealed the truncated remains of numbers 7–12 and 15 Dorset Street (all on the south side of the street), several cesspits and soakaways (brick-lined and horncore-lined), and significant assemblages of ceramic, glass, metal and other fragments dating from the late 17th century to the mid-19th. The finds included, in one of the cesspits, a group of up to 29 decorative ceramic figurines, tentatively associated with the pottery and glass retail outlet of Thomas Wedgwood (1800–1864; nephew of Josiah Wedgwood), which was based at 40 Dorset Street from c.1826 to c.1850. Also found were 21 human burials from the extramural northern cemetery of Roman Londinium.

== Cultural references ==
The history of Dorset Street is referred to in chapter 2 of Alan Moore's and Eddie Campbell's graphic novel From Hell (1989–1998).

== Sources ==
- Begg, Paul; Fido, Martin; Skinner, Keith (1996). The Jack the Ripper A–Z (third ed.). London: Headline. ISBN 0747255229.
- Finn, Ralph L. (1963). No Tears in Aldgate. London: Robert Hale.
- Jeffries, Nigel (2020). "Looking beyond the Ripper: reconstructing Dorset Street and White's Row, Spitalfields, London E1, an archaeological history of two East End streets, 1673–1927". Transactions of the London and Middlesex Archaeological Society. 71: 267–349.
- Rule, Fiona (2008). The Worst Street in London. Hersham, UK: Ian Allan. ISBN 978-0-7110-3345-0.
