= Snow Hill, London =

Location and street in the City of London

Coordinates: 51°31′2.89″N 0°6′14.82″W

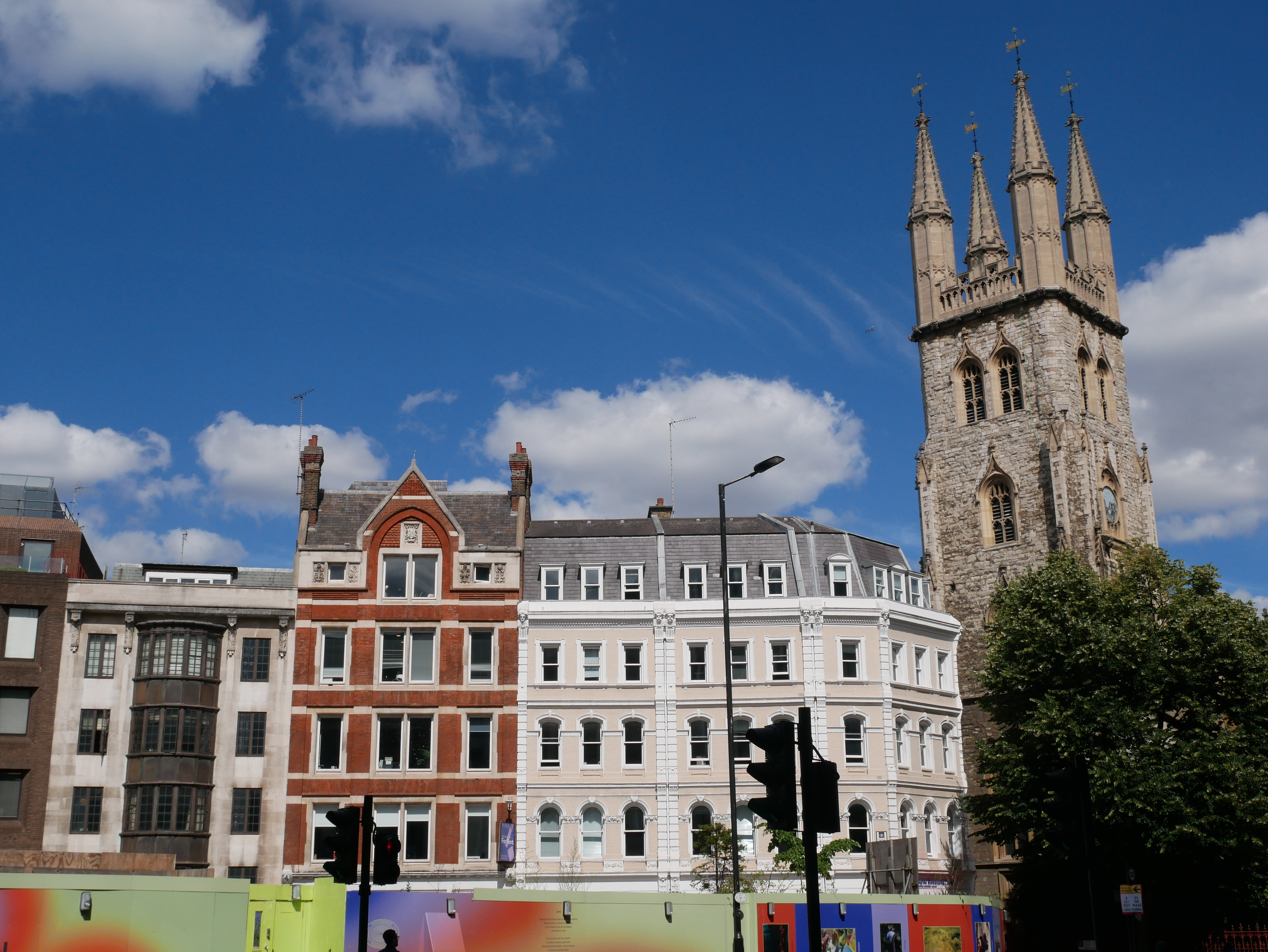
Snow Hill viewed from Holborn Viaduct in 2022, including Snow Hill Police Station (left) and St Sepulchres Church (right)

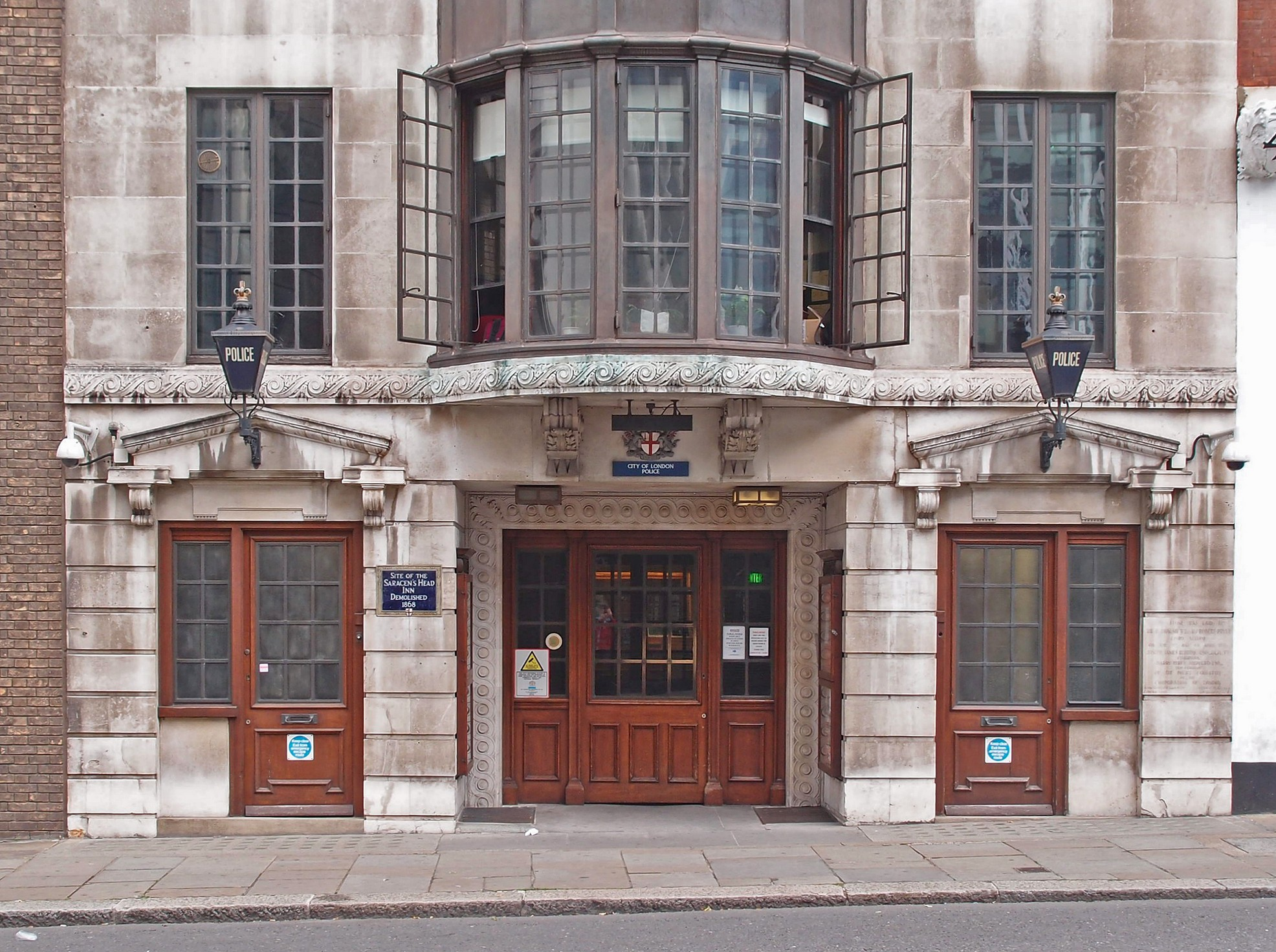
Entrance to Snow Hill Police Station, including a blue plaque to the left marking the former site of the Saracen's Head inn

Snow Hill is a location in the City of London. Historically it was the site of one of the City of London water conduits, which on days of great celebration was made to run with red and white wine, the last occasion being the anniversary of the coronation of George II in 1727.

Holborn Viaduct railway station was at one time known as Snow Hill. Snow Hill Tunnel runs from here under Smithfield Market.

The Saracen's Head was a popular inn on Snow Hill from the Middle Ages to the 19th century. It was demolished in 1868.

Snow Hill Police Station was designed by Sydney Perks in 1926 and has been a Grade II listed building since 1998. It includes a plaque marking the former site of the Saracen's Head inn. In January 2020 the police station was sold to Whitbread on a 151 year lease to be converted into a hotel.
