= Worshipful Company of Founders =

Livery company of the City of London

Coordinates: 51.51939°N 0.09910°W

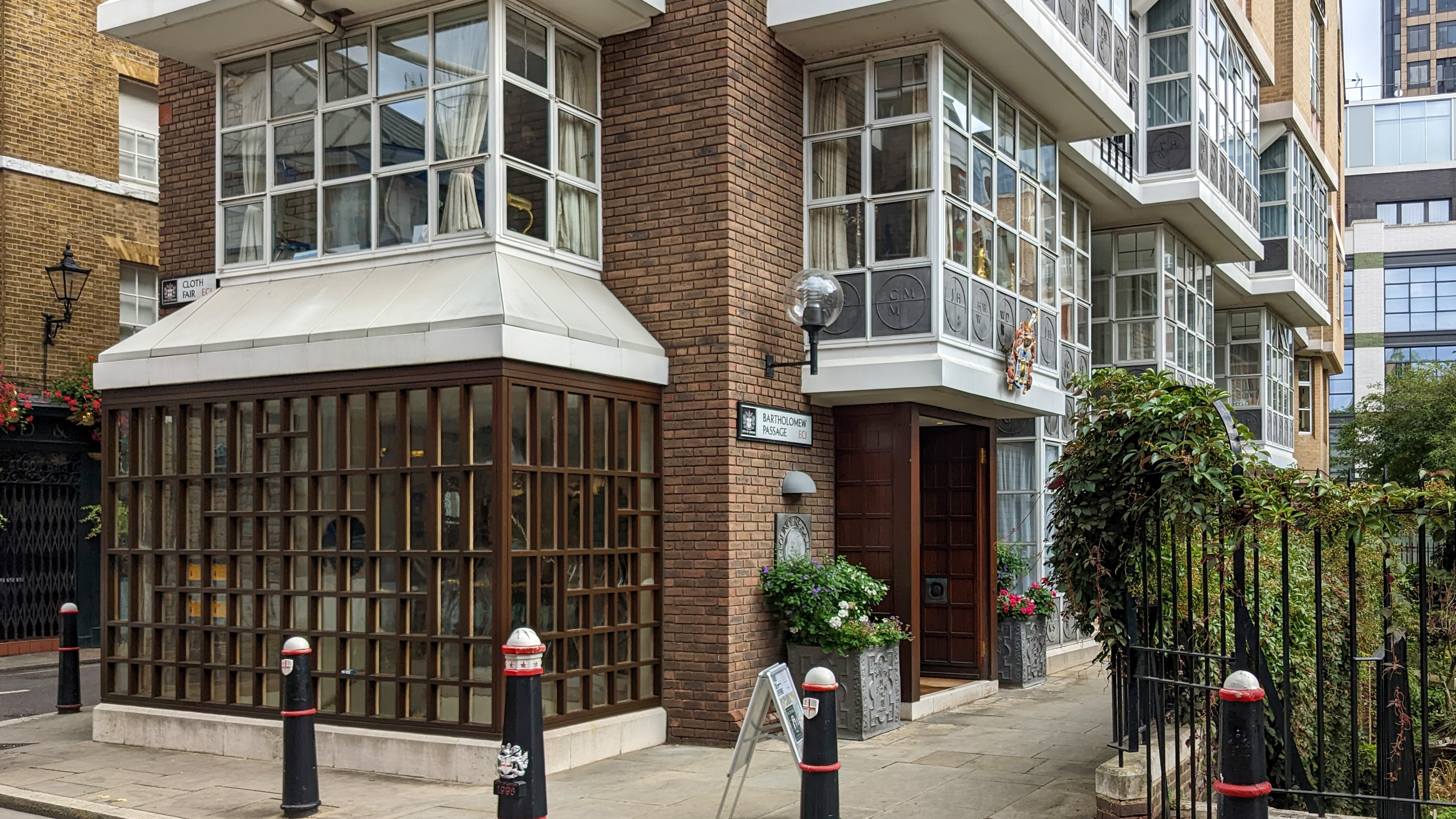
- The current Founders' Hall
- Motto: God, the only Founder
- Location: Founders' Hall, Number One, Cloth Fair, City of London
- Date of formation: 1365; 661 years ago
- Company association: Metal bashers
- Order of precedence: 33rd
- Website: www.foundersco.org.uk

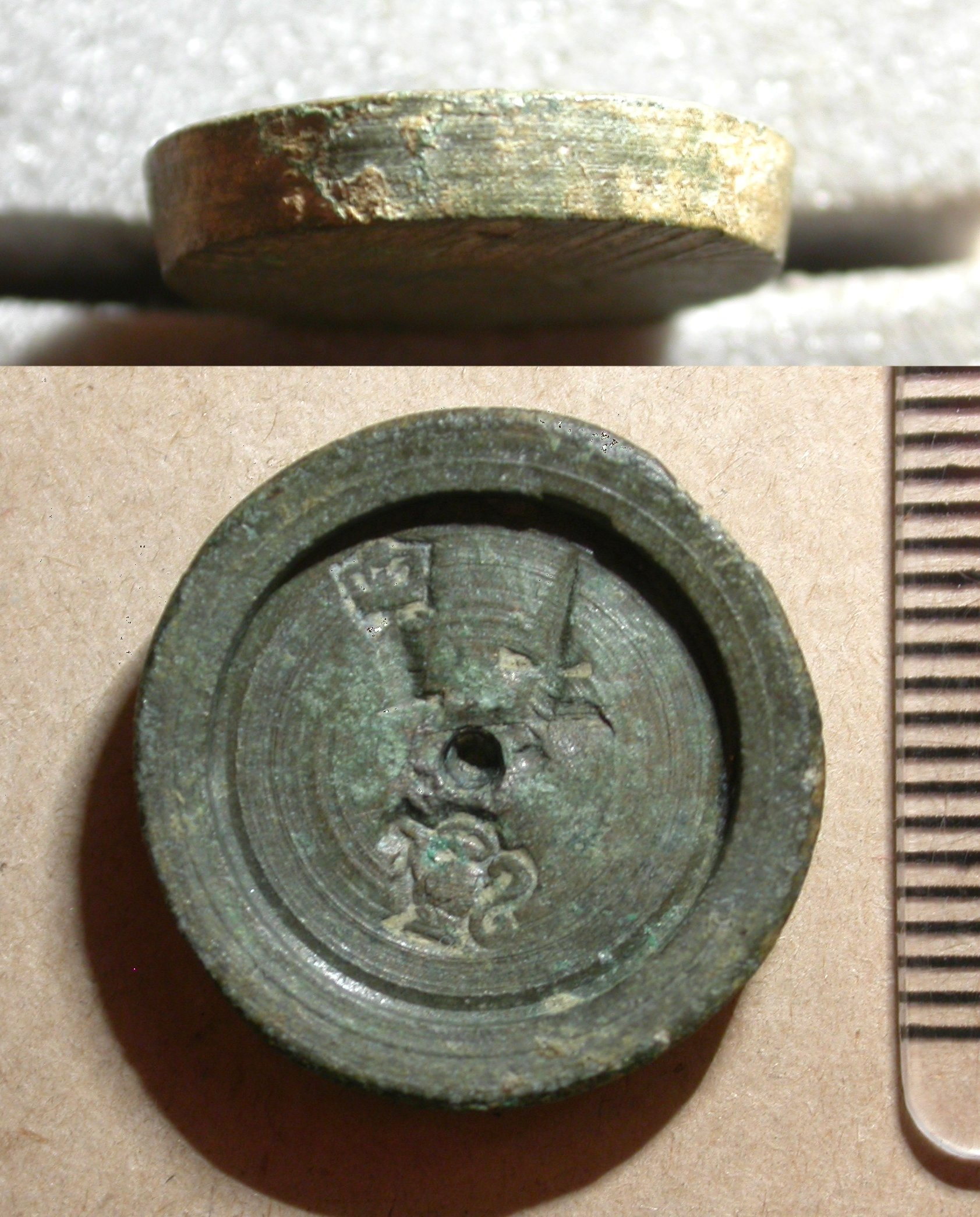
A bullion weight dated to 1688, stamped with a crown and ewer. The ewer is the symbol of the Worshipful Company of Founders and was used for countermarking bullion weights in the reign of William III and after 1772.

The Worshipful Company of Founders is one of the Livery Companies of the City of London, England. The Founders, or workers in brass and bronze, were incorporated under a Royal Charter in 1614. The Company is Trustee of charities which support the foundry industry by awarding grants and scholarships in materials engineering and other STEM subjects.

The Founders' Company ranks thirty-third in the order of precedence of Livery Companies. Its motto is God, The Only Founder. It had an early association with Saint Clement, having either been named the Fraternity of St Clement, or having had that organization as part of its body.

The 2024/25 Master Founder was Alan Hughes, director of the Whitechapel Bell Foundry. The 2025/26 Master Founder is HHJ Simon Oliver.

The Worshipful Company of Founders own their own Livery Hall in Cloth Fair. It was built between 1985 and 1987 and is Grade II* listed. In 2025 a pop-up restaurant was launched at Founders' Hall.

== Arms ==
Coat of arms of Worshipful Company of Founders
Crest On a wreath Or and azure, A fiery furnace proper, two arms of the last issuing from clouds on the sinister side also proper, the sleeves azure, the hands holding a pair of closing tongs sable taking hold of the melting pot in the furnace likewise proper. Mantled gules, doubled argent. Escutcheon Azure, a laver pot between two taper candlesticks Or. Motto God the only Founder.
