= St Paul's Tavern =

Former pub in the City of London

Coordinates: 51.520779°N 0.0909089°W

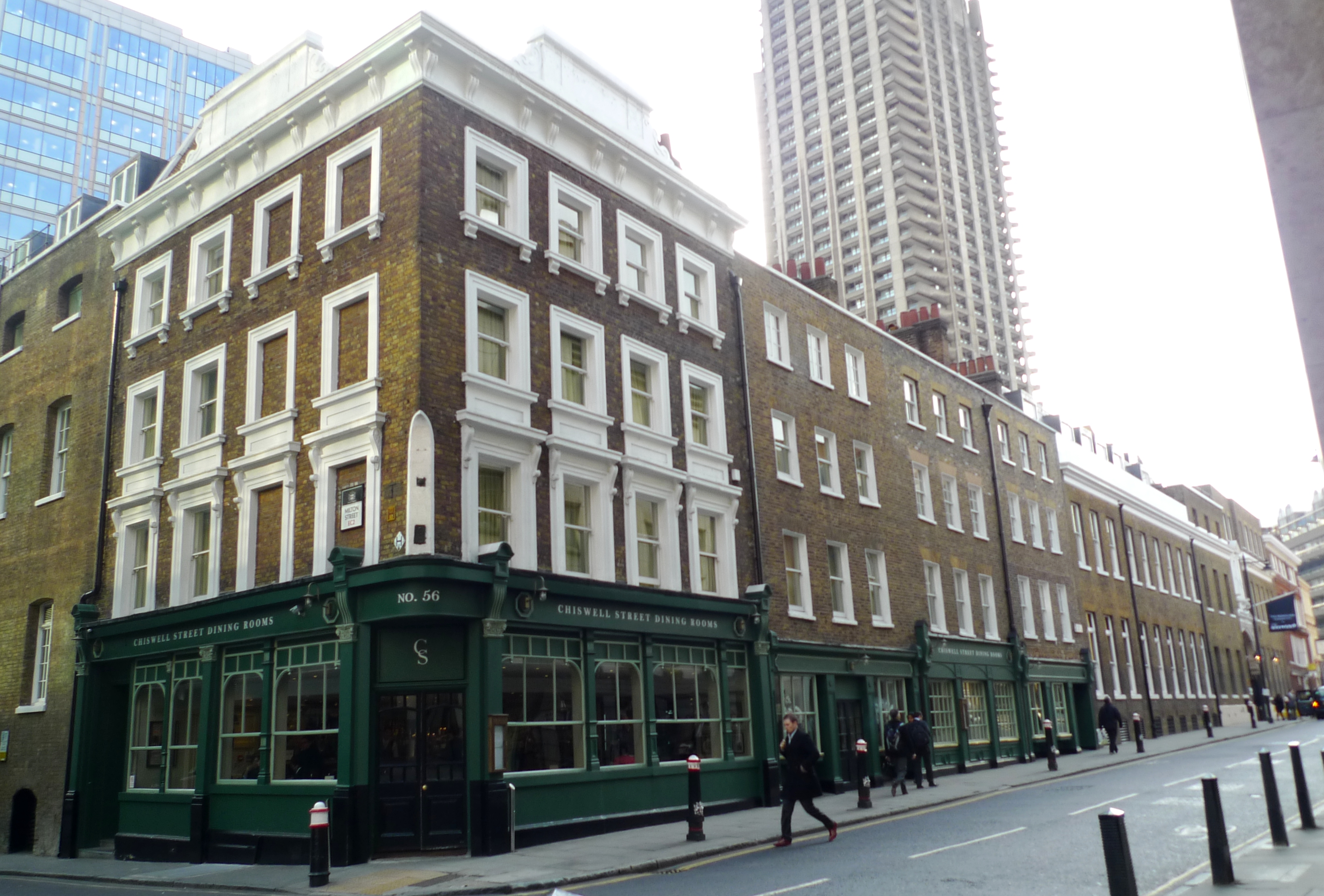
Chiswell Street Dining Rooms, formerly St Paul's Tavern

St Paul's Tavern is a former pub at 56 Chiswell Street, London EC1. It is now a restaurant, the Chiswell Street Dining Rooms.

It is a Grade II listed building, dating back to the mid-late 18th century.
