= The Jugged Hare =

Pub in the City of London

Coordinates: 51°31′14.9″N 0°5′32.07″W

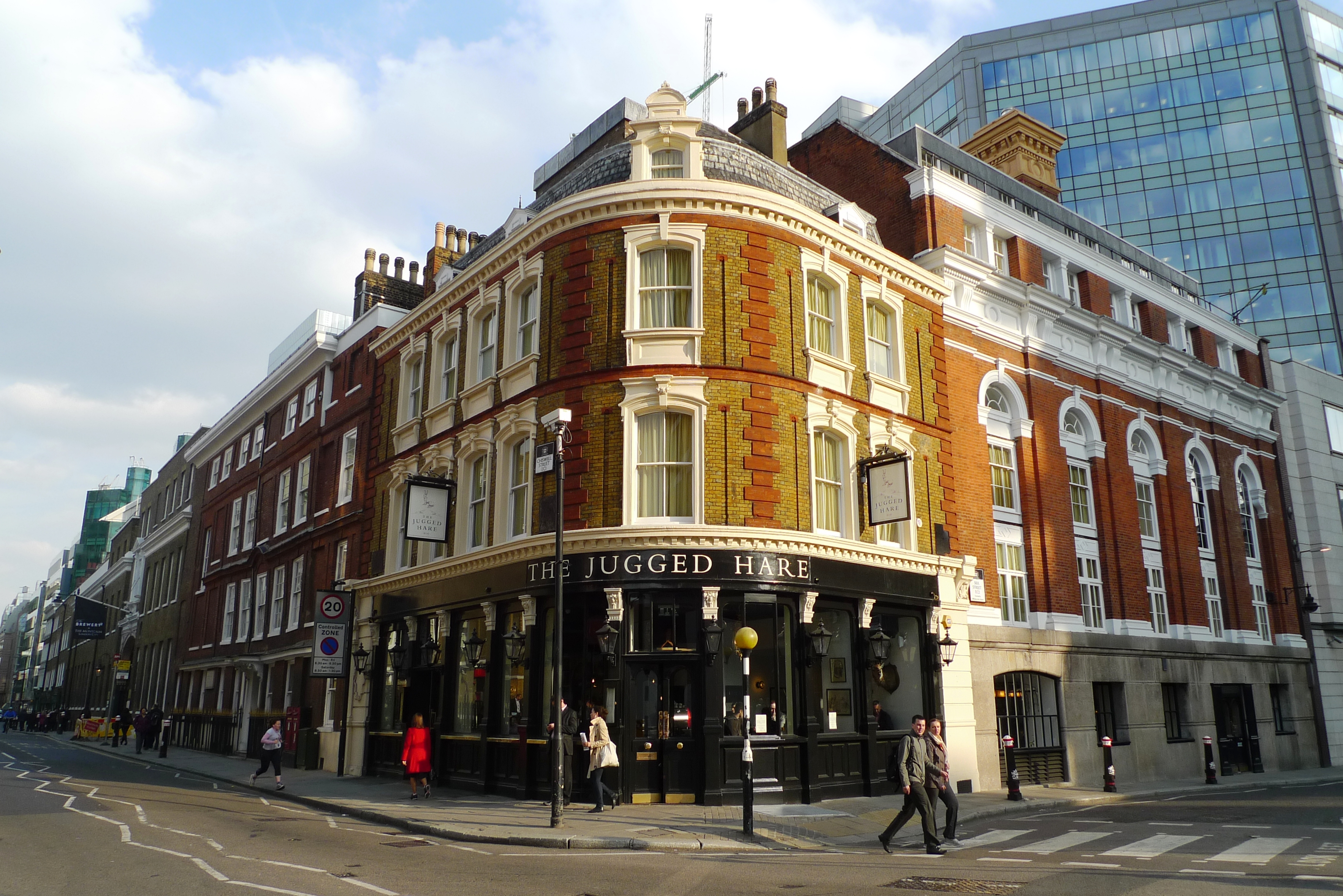
The Jugged Hare

The Jugged Hare is a public house and restaurant at 49 Chiswell Street, between the Barbican and Moorgate underground stations in the City of London.

The 19th century pub was originally named the King's Head, after the King’s Head Brewhouse, demolished in 1750 and re-built as the Whitbread Brewery. It closed in 2008 as part of the Brewery's refurbishment project, reopening as The Jugged Hare in 2012, run by brothers Ed and Tom Martin, who also run The Gun in the Docklands and The Prince Arthur in London Fields, among other establishments. The decor includes oak flooring, red leather seating and a collection of stuffed and mounted animals.

Upon opening, it was reviewed favourably by restaurant critic Giles Coren of The Times, who called it "a very good addition to a good chain of pubs".
