= Saracen's Head, London =

Pub in London

Coordinates: 51°31′01.5″N 0°06′10.4″W

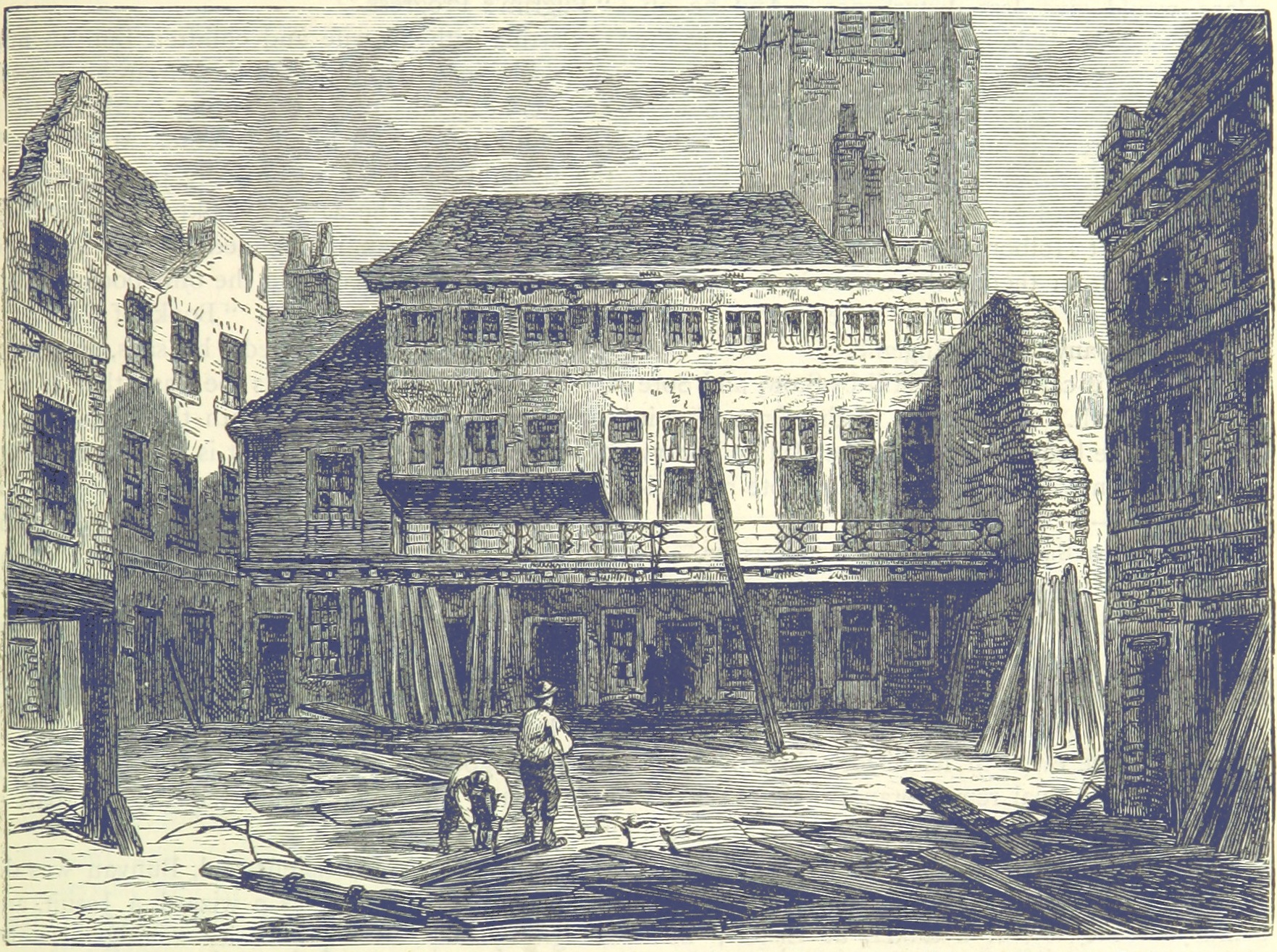
An 1868 illustration of the Saracen's Head, made during its demolition

The Saracen's Head was an inn on the north side of the street to the west of the church of St Sepulchre-without-Newgate in Snow Hill, London. When Sarah Ann Mountain was in charge they made stagecoaches here and fifteen of them left each day for destinations including Birmingham and Leeds.

== History ==
The inn dated from the Middle Ages, when it was a coaching inn. The origins of the name, "Saracen's Head", are uncertain. It became a popular stop for mail coaches approaching the City of London as it provided a place for passengers to rest. It featured a large gateway that led into a courtyard with numerous galleries leading into individual bedrooms. In 1522, Charles V, Holy Roman Emperor, stayed at the inn, by which time it had 30 beds and could stable four horses.

The Site of the Saracen's Head in 2016

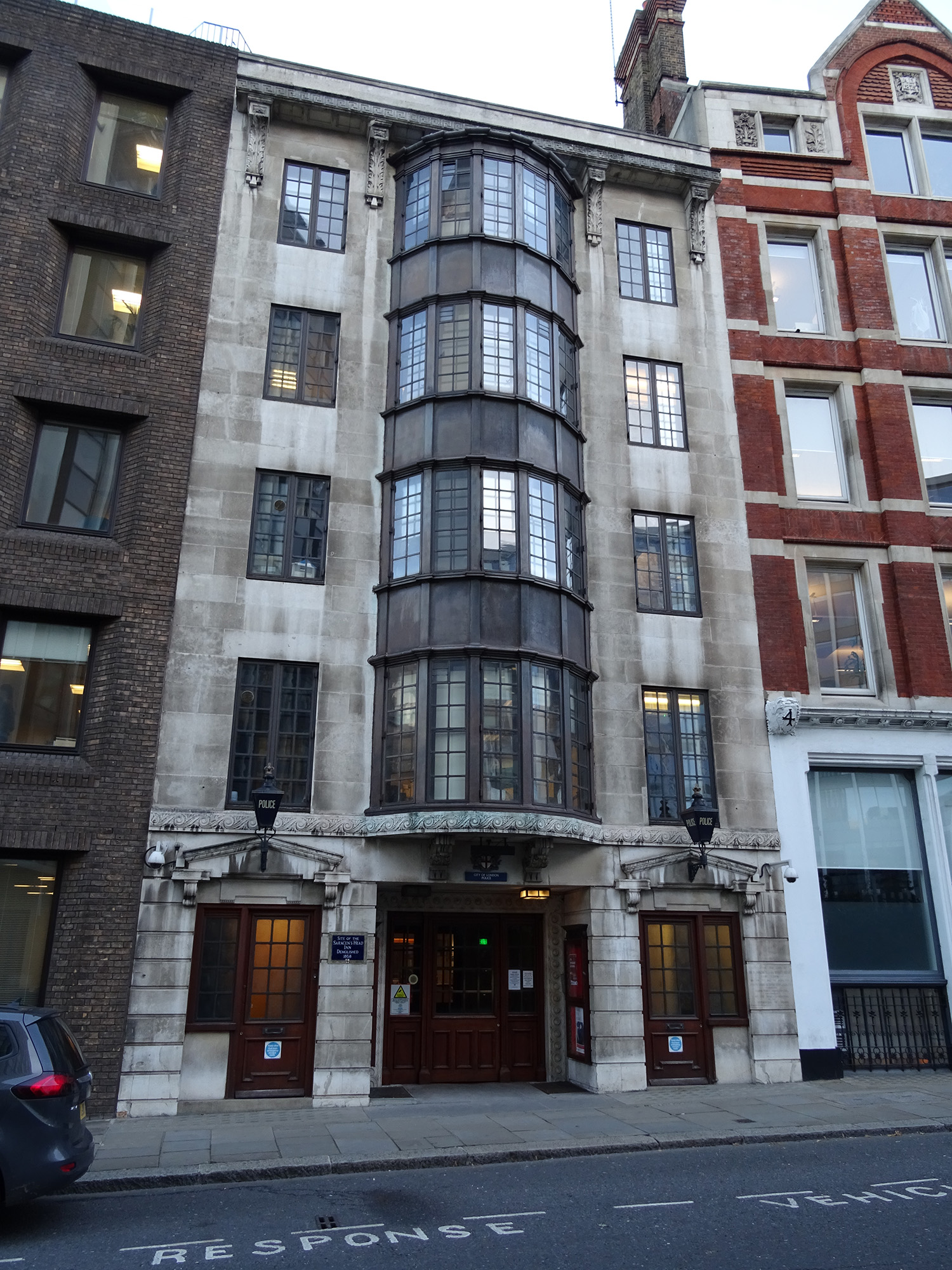
5 Snow Hill, London

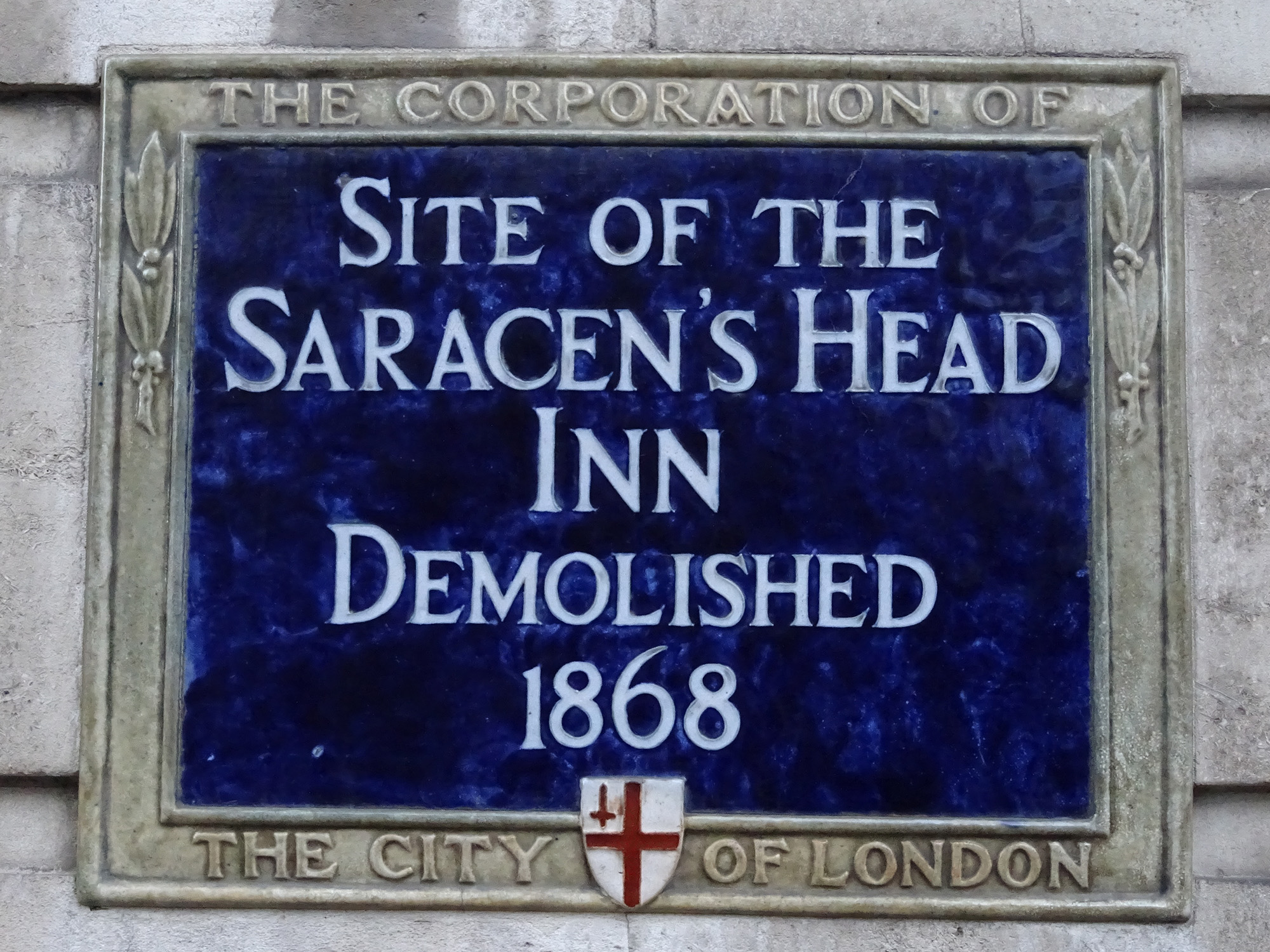
Commemorative Plaque

Samuel Pepys and Jonathan Swift were reported to be regular patrons at the inn. In the 18th century, the Mohocks kidnapped several elderly women at the inn, trapped them in barrels, and rolled them downhill towards Newgate Street.

During the 19th century, there were three signs on each side of the inn with a picture of a Saracen. Butler William Mountain and his wife Sarah Ann Mountain would be noted innkeepers of the Saracen's Head, Snow Hill. Butler joined the innkeepers company in 1808. Sarah took over the inn in 1818 when her husband died. When Sarah Ann Mountain was in charge they made stagecoaches here and fifteen of them left each day for destinations including Birmingham and Leeds.

The Saracen's Head was demolished in 1868 to construct the Holborn Viaduct. The landlord was subsequently arrested for attempting to sell spirits in an adjoining property following the inn's closure, as his licence had been revoked. There is a plaque noting the inn on the current premises.

== In fiction ==
The inn was mentioned in Charles Dickens' Nicholas Nickleby, referencing two of the signs that adorned the courtyard gateway, and is where Nickleby first meets the schoolmaster Wackford Squeers.

A song about the inn appears in the 1914 novel, The Flying Inn by G. K. Chesterton. The inn is briefly mentioned in Hornblower and the Crisis (1967) by C. S. Forester.

== Sources ==
- Glinert, Ed (2004). The London Compendium: A Street-by-street Exploration of the Hidden Metropolis. Penguin. ISBN 978-0-141-01213-1.
- Weinreb, Ben; Hibbert, Christopher; Keay, John; Keay, Julia (2008). The London Encyclopaedia (3rd ed.). Pan Macmillan. ISBN 978-1-405-04924-5.
