= Silk Street, London =

Street in the City of London, England

Coordinates: 51°31′11.8″N 0°5′31.2″W

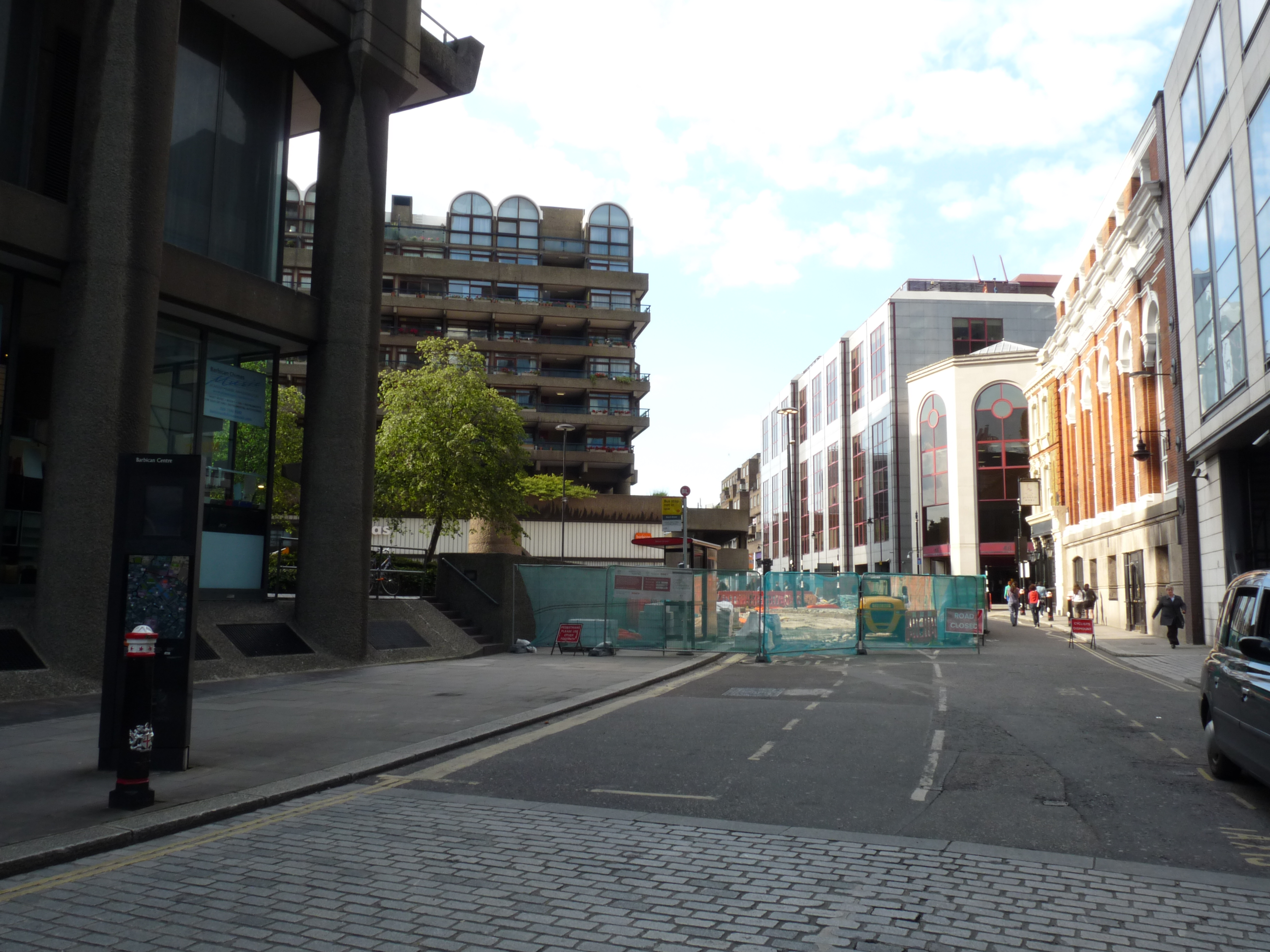
Silk Street, looking north

Silk Street is a street in the City of London, England. It runs north–south, and then west–east, from the junction with Beech Street (west), Chiswell Street (east) and Whitecross Street (north, continuing the street), to Moor Lane.

The northern junction marks the boundary of the city with Islington: Whitecross and Chiswell (north and east) are in Islington, while Beech and Silk (west and south) are in the city.

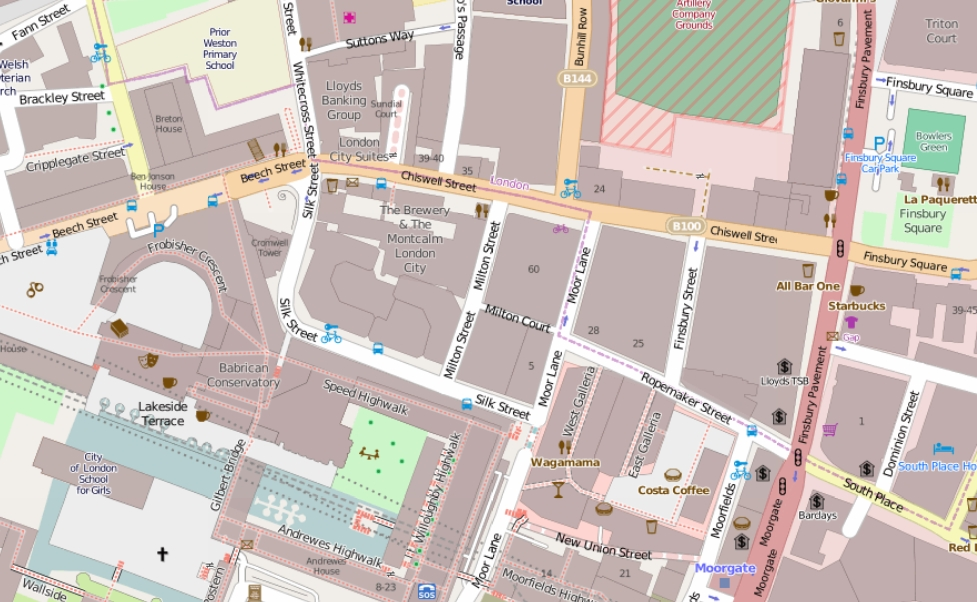
The immediate vicinity of Silk Street

The east–west section of Silk Street is a survival from the pre-World War II street pattern, running between Milton Street in the east and Whitecross Street in the west. West of Whitecross Street it continued as Paper Street. The area was heavily damaged during the war, and when the Barbican Estate was built in the area after the war, the southern part of Whitecross Street, south of Silk Street, was swallowed up by the development, as was Paper Street, and the short section of Whitecross Street between Silk Street and Chiswell Street/Beech Street was renamed to be part of Silk Street, forming the north–south section of today's Silk Street. In the east the street was extended beyond Milton Street to Moor Lane.

The main entrance to both the Barbican Centre and the Guildhall School of Music & Drama is in Silk Street.

The head office of Linklaters, the multinational law firm and member of the Magic Circle is at 1 Silk Street.

== See also ==
- Cripplegate
- Fore Street, London
- Grub Street
- Whitecross Street
