= List of buildings that survived the Great Fire of London =

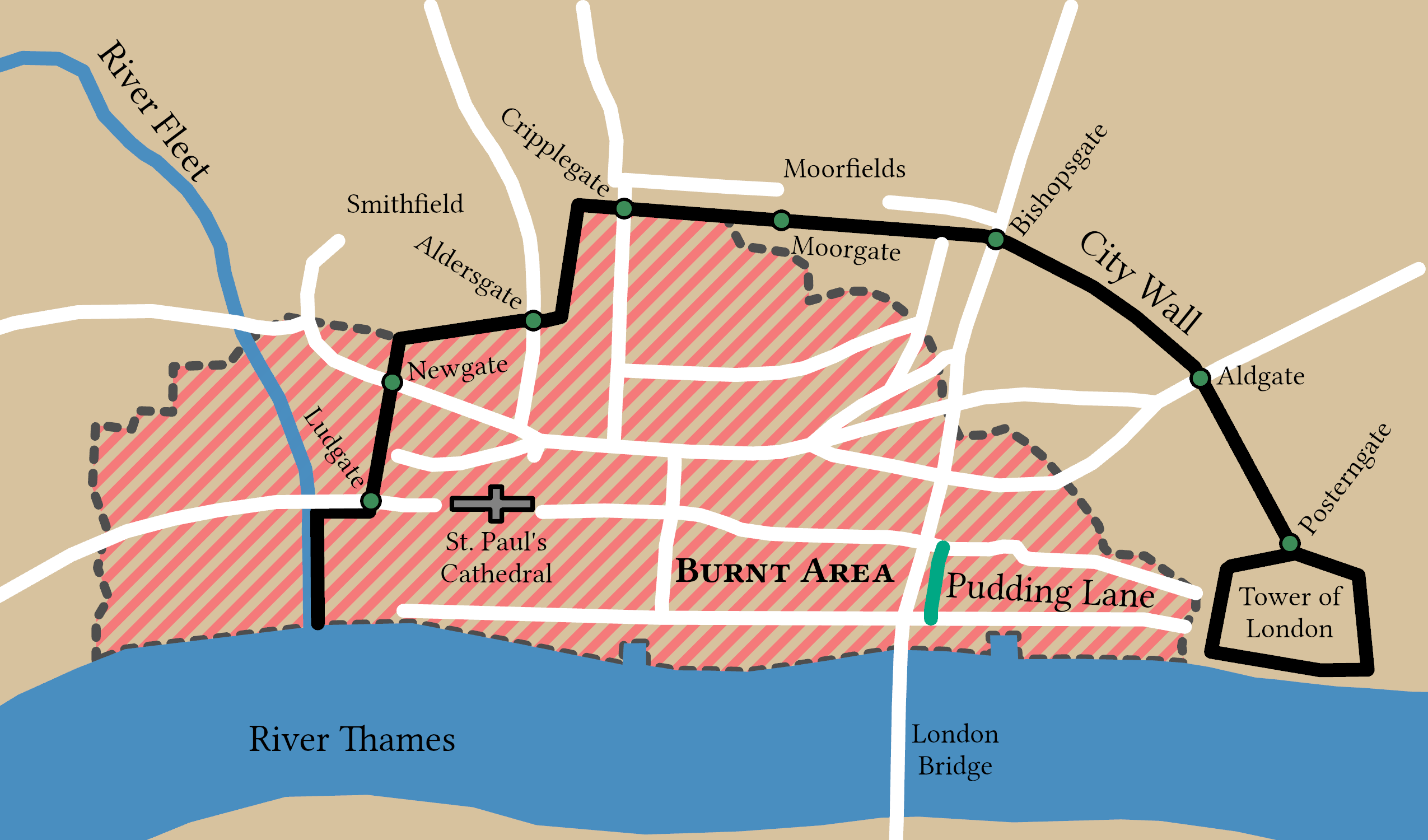
Central London in 1666, with the burnt area shown in pink.

This is a list of buildings that survived the Great Fire of London in 1666 and are still standing along with their listed grade.

Grade	Criteria
I	Buildings of exceptional interest.
II*	Particularly important buildings of more than special interest.
II	Buildings of national importance and special interest.

Name	Location	Type	Date	Grid ref. Geo-coordinates	Image	Grade
41–41 Cloth Fair	Cloth Fair	House	1597–1614			II*
74–75 Long Lane	Long Lane	House	1598			II
229 Strand	Strand	Townhouse	1625			II*
All Hallows-by-the-Tower	Byward Street	Church	1658	51.5094°N 0.0794°W		I
The Guildhall	Gresham Street	City Hall	1411	51.5159°N 0.092°W		I
The Hoop and Grapes	Aldgate High Street	Public House	Late 17th century	51.51421°N 0.074177°W		II*
The Old Curiosity Shop	Portsmouth Street	Shop	1567			II*
The Olde Wine Shades	Martin Lane	Public House	1663			II
Prince Henry's Room	Fleet Street	Townhouse	1610	51°30′50″N 0°6′39″W		II*
Saint Andrew Undershaft	Saint Mary Axe	Church	1532	51°30′49.18″N 0°4′52.72″W		I
Saint Bartholomew's Gatehouse	West Smithfield	Gatehouse	1595			II*
Saint Etheldreda's Church	Ely Place	Church	1290	51.5187°N 0.1074°W		I
Saint Giles-without-Cripplegate	Fore Street	Church	1394, 1545 and 1682	51°31′7.38″N 0°5′38.55″W		I
Saint Helen's Bishopsgate	Great St Helen's	Church	12th century	51.5148°N 0.0818°W		I
Saint Katharine Cree	Leadenhall Street	Church	1631 (tower from 1504)	51°30′48.28″N 0°4′44.88″W		I
Saint Olave	Hart Street	Church	1450	51°30′39.04″N 0°4′46.88″W		I
The Staple Inn	High Holborn	Inn of Chancery	1585	51°31′04.68″N 0°06′40.28″W		I
The Seven Stars	Carey Street	Public House	1602	51.514950°N 0.11360747°W		II
The Tower of London	St Katharine's & Wapping	Castle	1078	51°30′29″N 00°04′34″W		I

== See also ==
- Great Fire of London
- List of demolished buildings and structures in London
