= Long Lane, London =

Long Lane, London, England may be:

- Long Lane, City of London
- Long Lane, Southwark
