= Fore Street, London =

Street in the City of London, England

Coordinates: 51.5182°N 0.0918°W

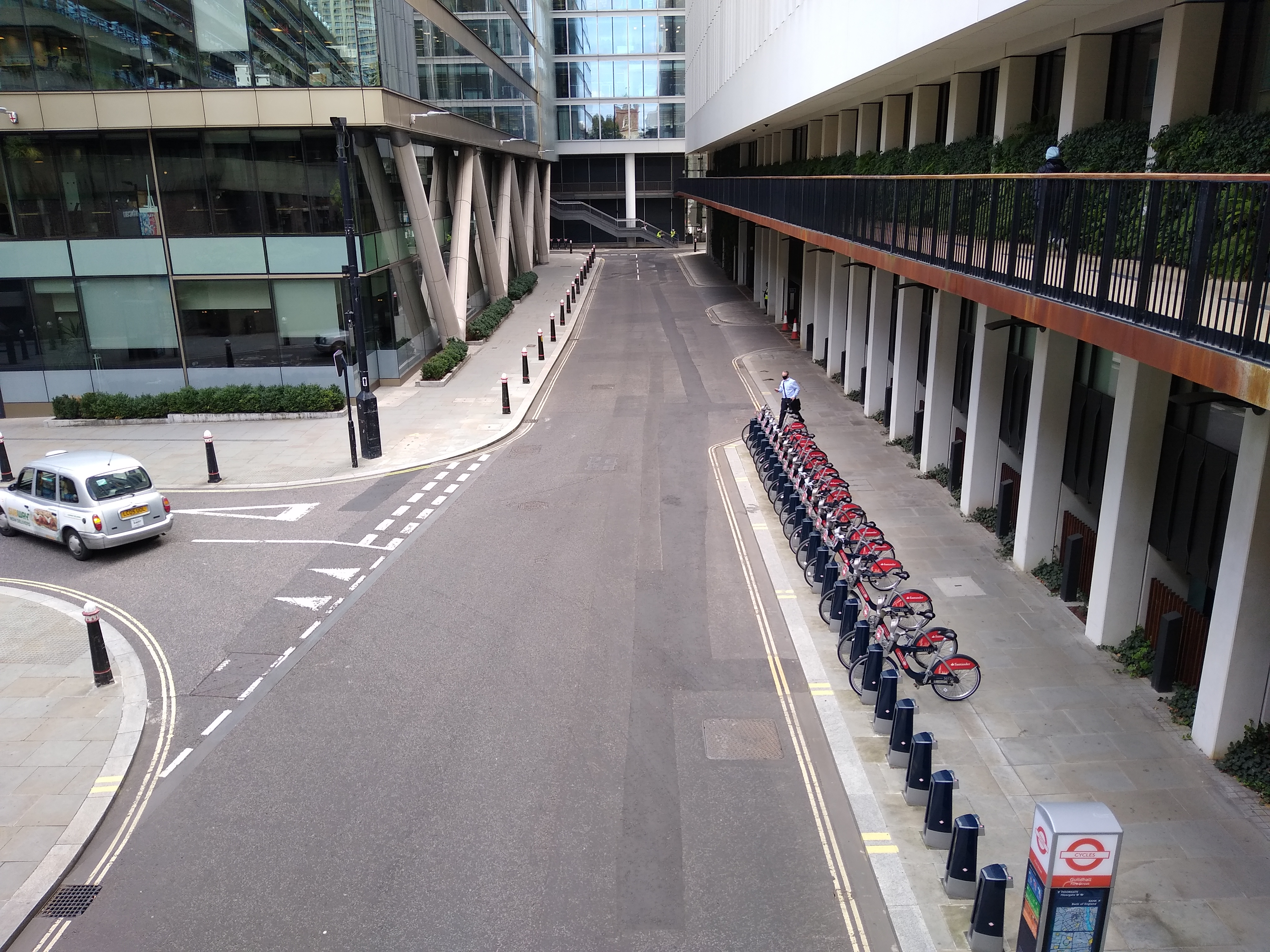
Fore Street

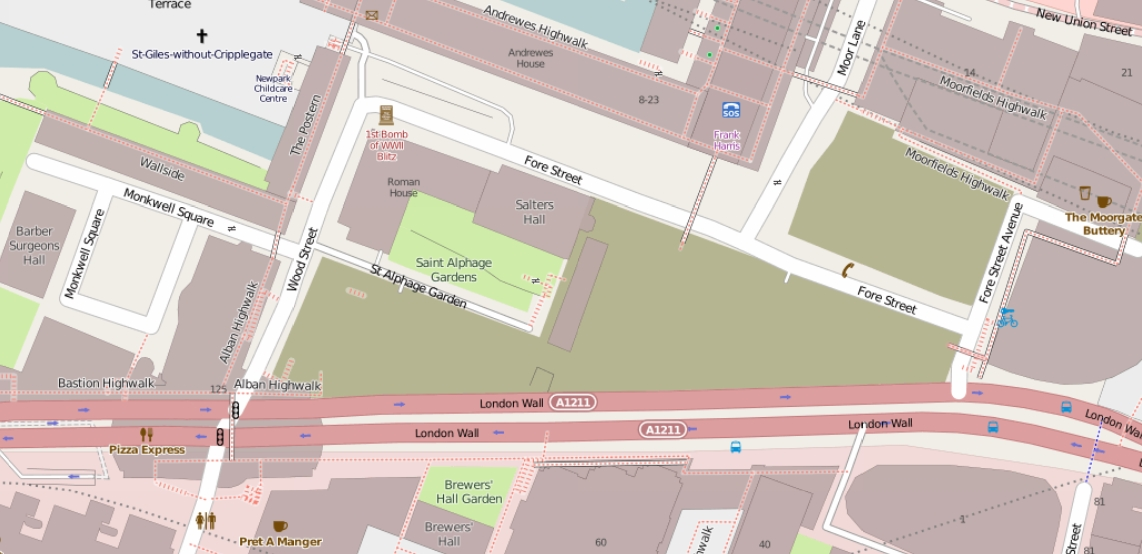
The immediate vicinity of Fore Street

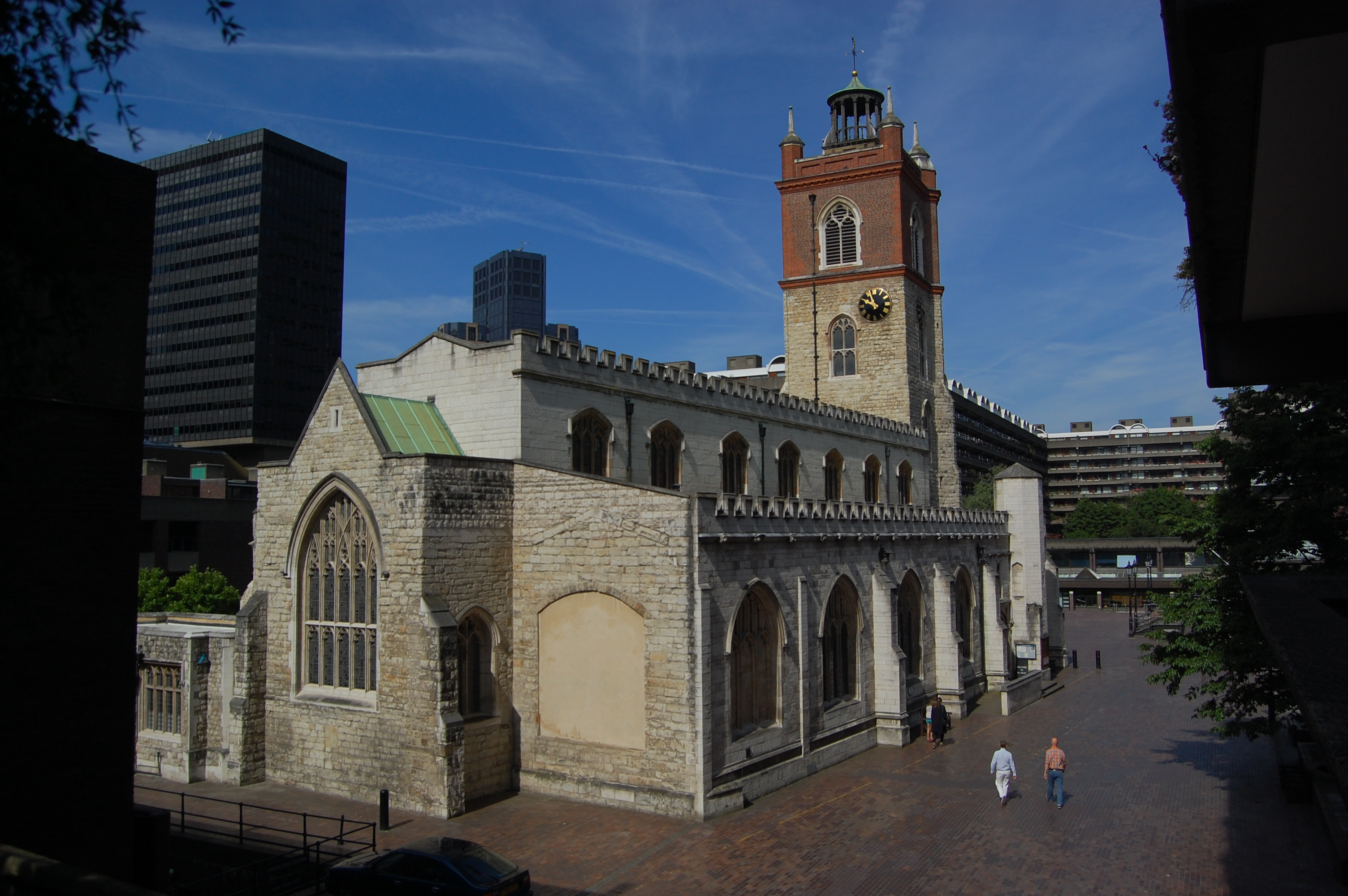
St Giles-without-Cripplegate

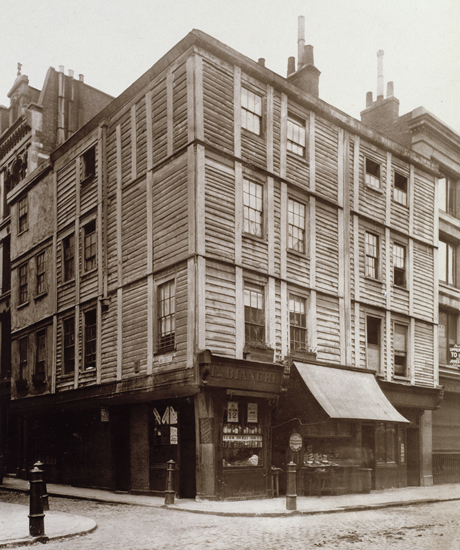
Bianchi's shop in Fore Street, London 1884

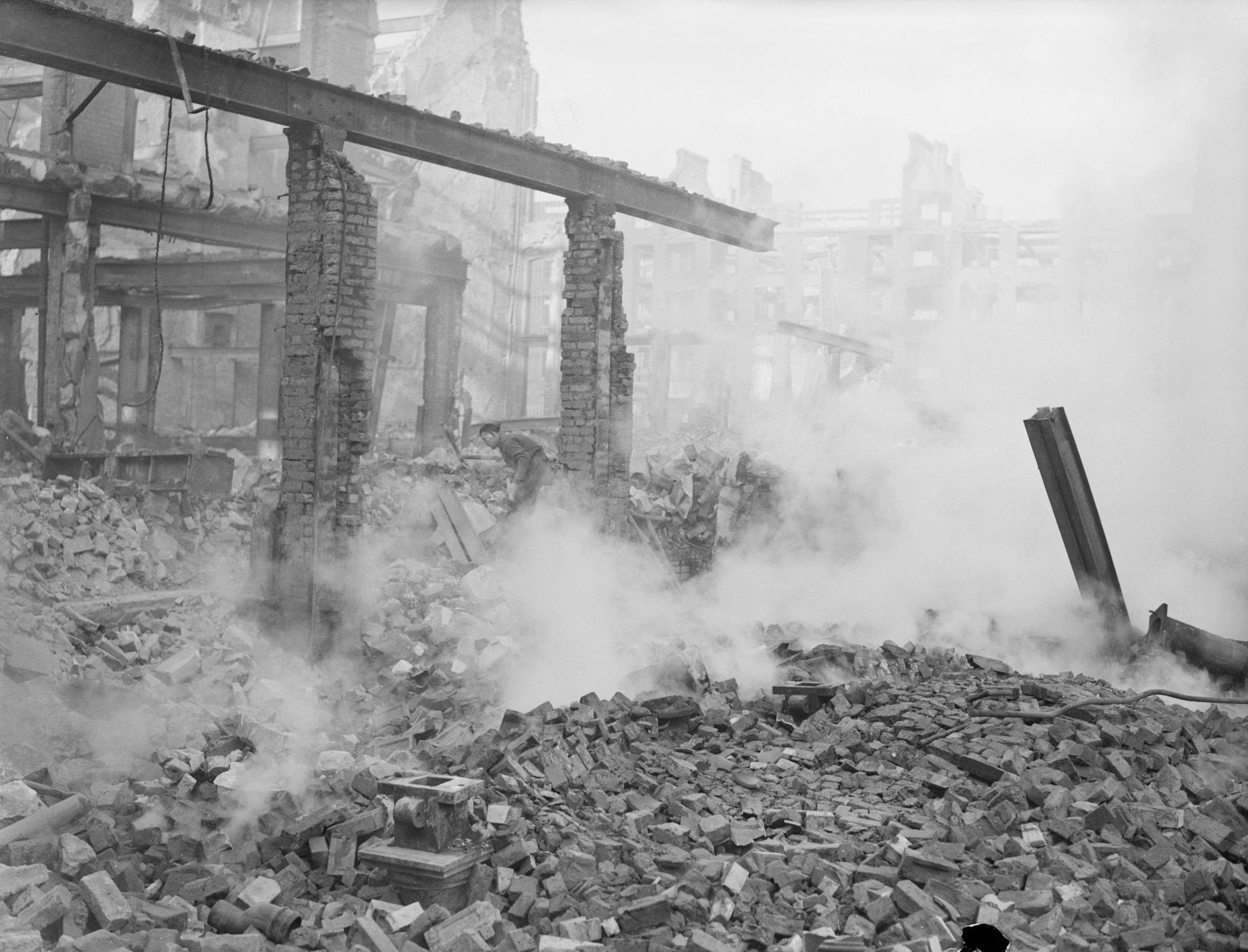
Inspecting bomb damage, January 1941

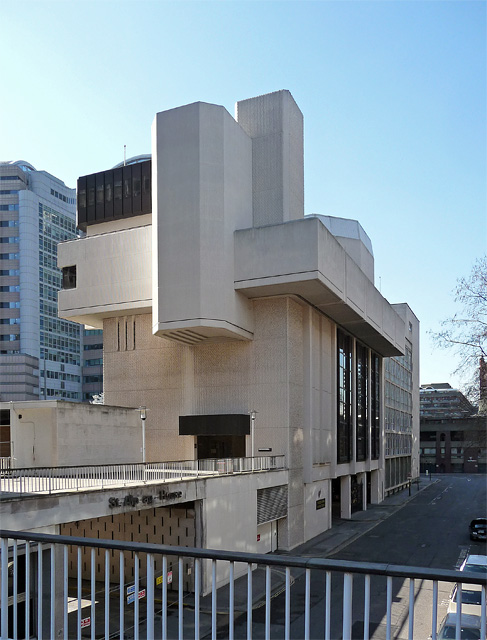
Salters' Hall

Fore Street is a street in the City of London, England, near the Barbican Centre. It runs from Wood Street to Fore Street Avenue and is joined by Moor Lane on its north side. The street was extensively damaged by German bombing during World War II and, following later development, nothing now remains of its original buildings other than St Giles-without-Cripplegate, which is a short distance away from the modern street.

== History ==
Fore Street was created outside (before) the London city walls, and thereby got its name. In 1654, a postern gate was built at the northern end of Aldermanbury or the larger Cripplegate and Fore Street soon became an important shopping street until the middle of the nineteenth century.

In the nineteenth century, Joseph Todd established his drapery business in Fore Street. James Morrison, who subsequently became a millionaire and MP started work for Todd and married his daughter. The firm became known as Morrison, Dillon & Co, and later was converted into the Fore Street Limited Liability Company.

Before bombing during the Second World War, the street extended from Redcross Street to Finsbury Pavement.

Fore Street, on 25 August 1940, was the first place in the City of London to be hit by a German bomb during the Second World War, just before the start of the London Blitz proper. A plaque on the wall of Roman House, on the corner with Wood Street, marks the spot.

Up to the 1970s a Post Office telephone exchange stood between Moor Lane and Fore Street Avenue with a Post Office on the corner between Fore Street and Fore Street Avenue.

== Buildings ==
St Giles-without-Cripplegate, a Church of England church, is located in Fore Street. When built in the 11th century it stood without (that is, outside) the city wall, near the Cripplegate. The church is dedicated to St Giles, patron saint of beggars and cripples. It is one of the few medieval churches left in the City of London, having survived the Great Fire of 1666, but it has been extensively altered and rebuilt over the years and was badly damaged by bombing during the Second World War. Oliver Cromwell married Elizabeth Bourchier there in 1620. Martin Frobisher, John Speed and John Milton were all buried there.

Salters' Hall, home of the Worshipful Company of Salters, is at 4 Fore Street. The present building, opened in 1976, was originally designed by architect Basil Spence.

== Inhabitants ==
Novelist Daniel Defoe was probably born in Fore Street in around 1660. The exact date and house are not known. His father, James Foe, was a prosperous tallow chandler and a member of the Butchers' Company.

In 1850, Ebenezer Howard, originator of the garden city movement and the son of a confectioner, was born in the street.

== See also ==
- Grub Street
- Whitecross Street
