= Whitecross Street =

Street in Islington, London

Coordinates: 51.5229°N 0.09281°W

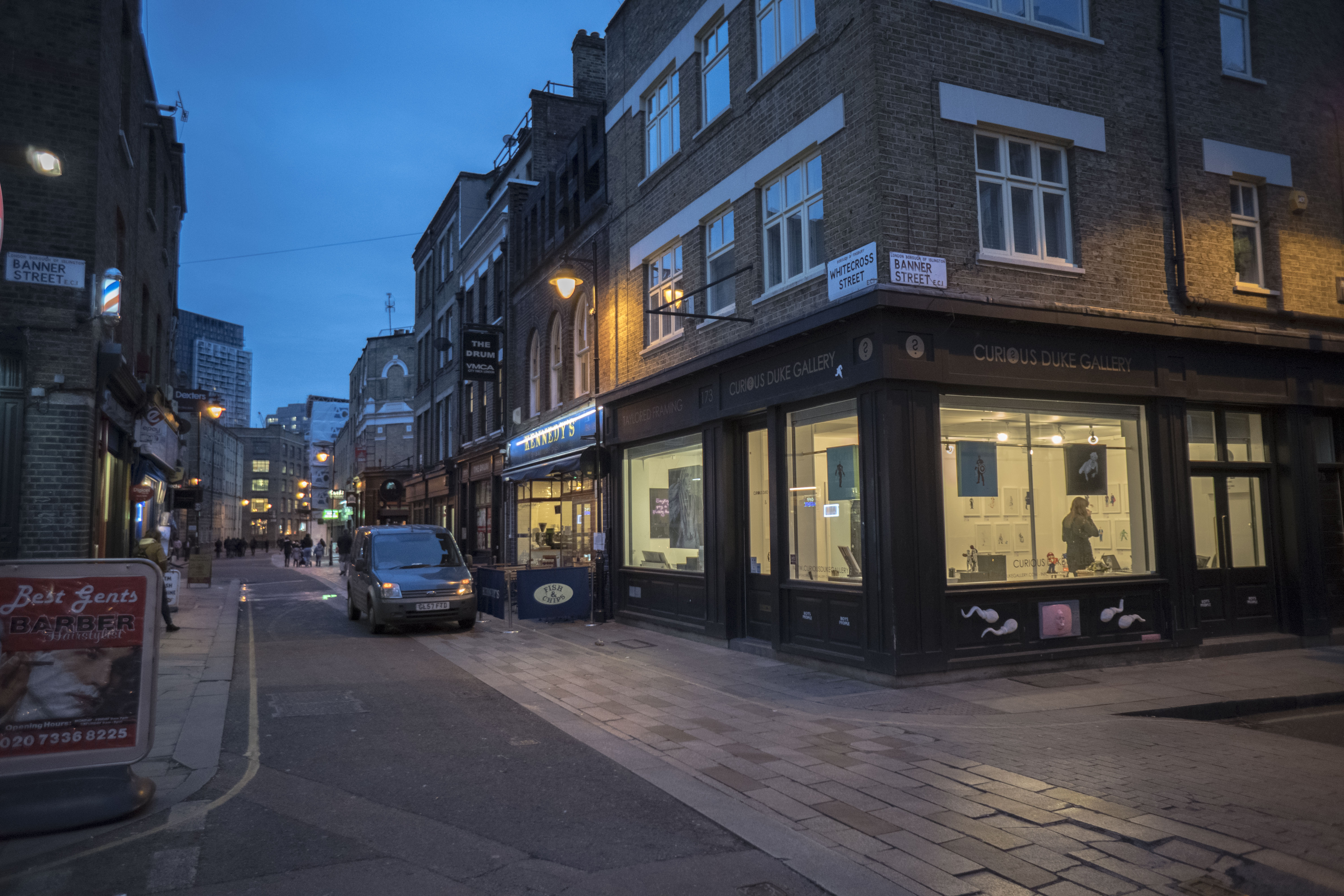
Whitecross Street

Whitecross Street is a short street in Islington, in Inner London. It features an eponymous street market and a large housing estate.

Since 2010, there has been an annual Whitecross Street Party one weekend in the summer, together with an exhibition of street art.

== Location ==
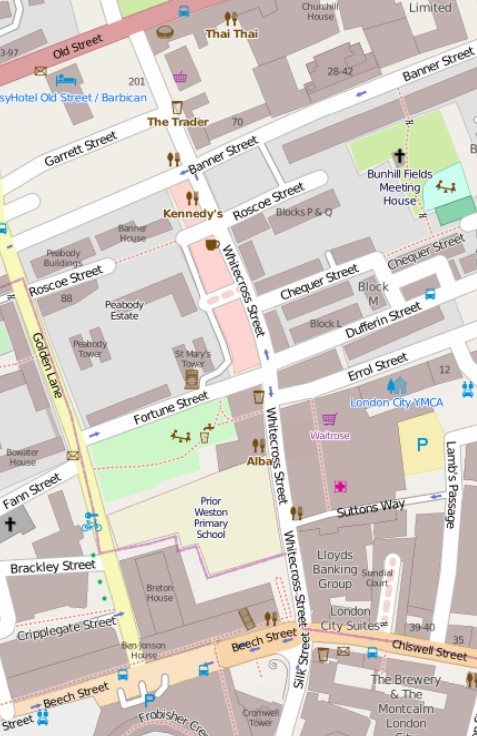
The immediate vicinity of Whitecross Street

The street is located in St Luke's, Islington. It runs north–south, between Old Street in the north, where it abuts St Luke Old Street, and the junction with Beech Street (west), Chiswell Street (east) and Silk Street (south, continuing the street) in the south. The southern junction marks the boundary with the City of London: Whitecross and Chiswell (north and east) are in Islington, while Beech and Silk (west and south) are in the city.

== History ==
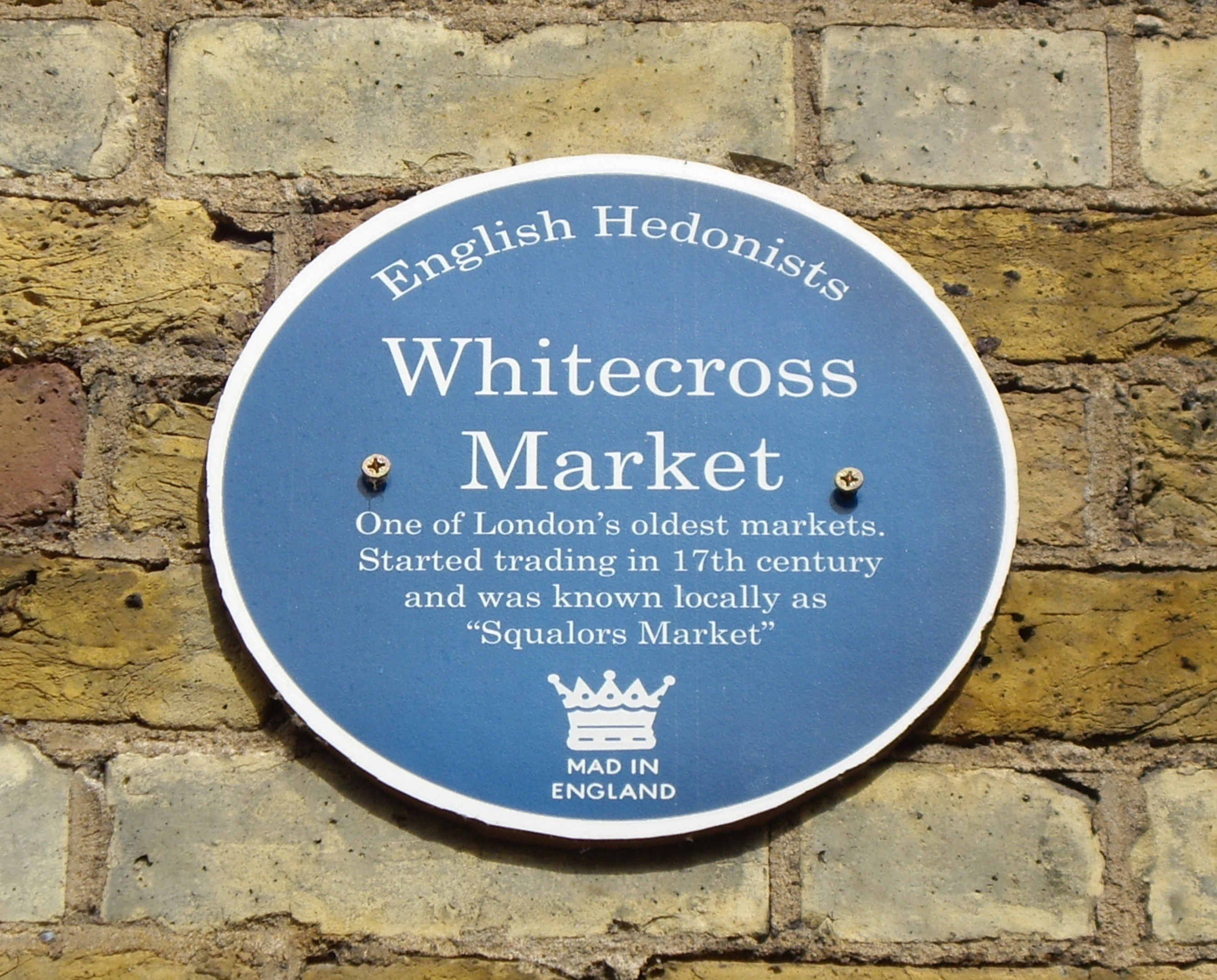
Whitecross-Street-Market plaque

Whitecross Street formerly continued further south from its current southern end, to just outside Cripplegate, a gate of the London Wall surrounding the City of London.

In his 1720 work, A Survey of the Cities of London and Westminster, John Strype wrote:

In Whitecross street, King Henry V. builded one fair House; and founded there a Brotherhood of St. Giles, to be kept. Which House, had sometime been an Hospital of the French Order, by the Name of St. Giles without Cripplegate, in the Reign of Edward I. The King having the Jurisdiction, and appointing a Custos thereof, for the Precinct of St. Giles, &c. Which Hospital being suppressed, the Lands were given to the Brotherhood, for the relief of the Poor. In this Street was a White cross; and near it was built an Arch of Stone, under which ran a Course of Water down to the Moor, called now Moorfields."

The Fortune Playhouse, an early Elizabethan theatre, was built on the street c.1600. John Lambe was killed in 1628 at this theatre. It was closed in 1642 as part of Parliament's closure of all theatres. A debtors' prison, Whitecross Street Prison, was built on the street in 1813–15, near Fore Street (which still exists). After the prison's closure in 1870, the Midland Railway Company built a goods terminus and a booking office for goods and passengers on the site in 1876–77.

In between 1876 and 1906 the Cripplegate Bank was located at 31 and then 1 Whitecross Street, before been incorporated into the Union Bank of London.

The Cripplegate area was heavily damaged during World War II. When the Barbican Estate and Barbican Centre were reconstructed after the war, the section of Whitecross Street south of Silk Street was swallowed up by the new construction. The short section between Silk Street and Chiswell Street/Beech Street became part of Silk Street. St Giles Cripplegate, mentioned by Strype, is now within the Barbican Estate.

== Whitecross Street Market ==
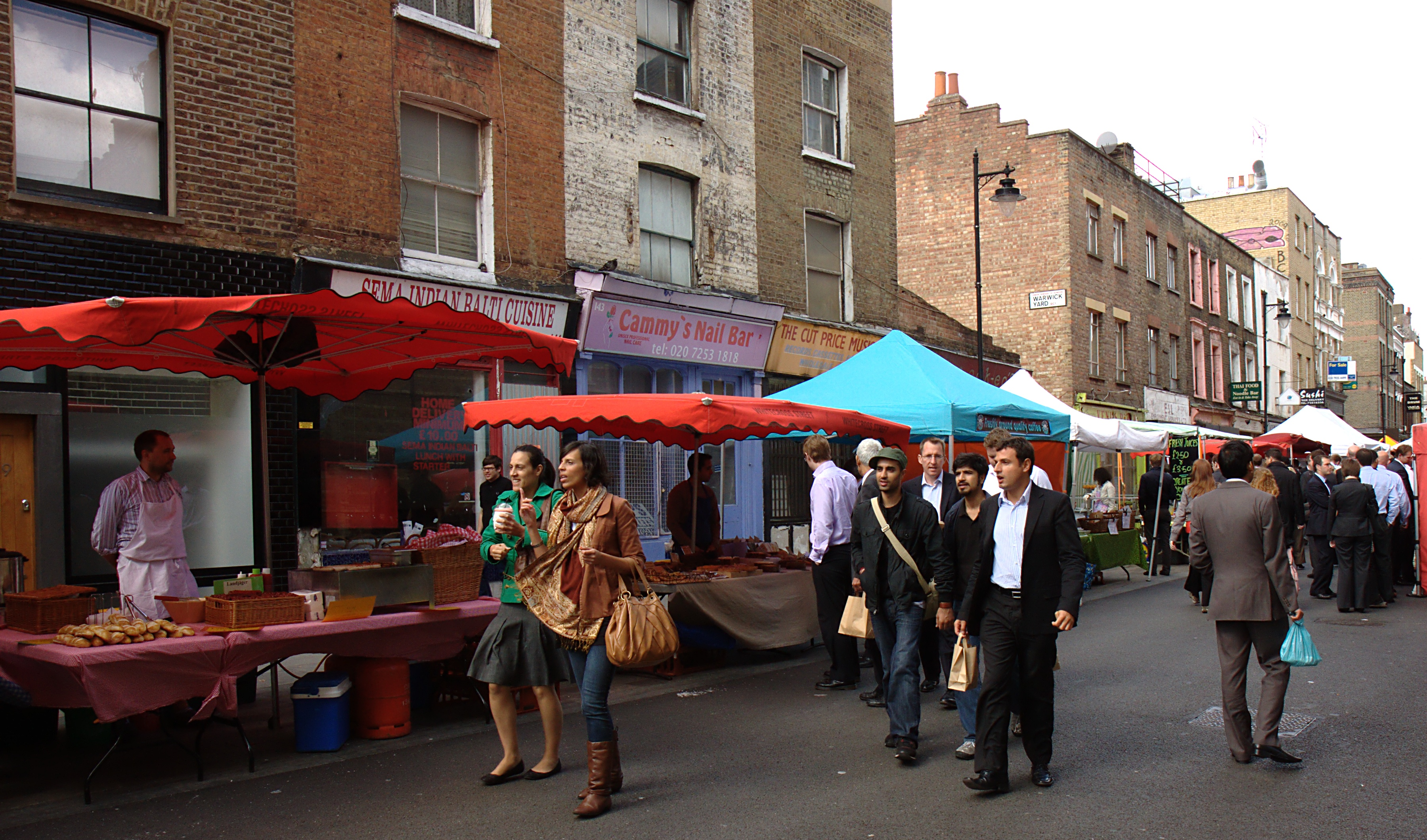
Whitecross Street Market, looking northwest

Whitecross Street Market, having been in existence for over 150 years, is one of London's oldest markets. The market was formerly one of London's great Sunday markets, and dates to the 17th century; although today, trading is largely limited to lunch times. During the mid-19th century, the street vendors and costermongers operating out of an informal street market in Whitecross Street came to public attention following the publication of a series of articles written by journalist, James Greenwood, and published in the Pall Mall Gazette. Greenwood's articles presented a brutal picture of the lives of London's poorest classes and caused a public sensation. By the end of the 19th century, the area had become a by-word for poverty and alcohol, and it became known as Squalors' Market.

Today the market consists of stalls arranged along the northern half of the street, between Old Street and Fortune Street, with the road closed to traffic. There is a small general market and a food market of up to 50 food and drink vendors Monday–Friday lunchtime, which can be bustling with activity (and queues) on a sunny lunch time. It has occasional food festivals. In recent times, there has been significant investment from Islington Council, the City of London and English Heritage. It is open Monday–Friday, 10am–2pm.

== Whitecross Street Prison ==
Whitecross Street Prison was a debtors' prison built 1813–15 to ease overcrowding at Newgate Prison. It had a capacity of 400 prisoners. It closed in 1870, when all of the prisoners were transferred to the newly built Holloway Prison.

== Other buildings ==
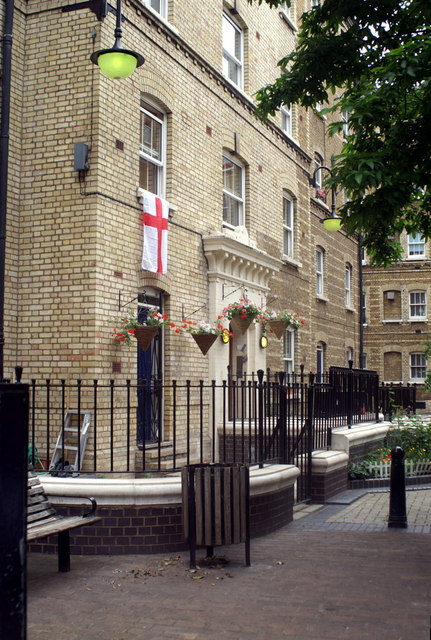
Whitecross Street Estate

The Peabody Trust, one of London's oldest and largest housing associations, has a significant estate of social housing there, the Whitecross Street Estate.
