= The Olde Wine Shades =

Pub in the City of London

Coordinates: 51.5104°N 0.0879°W

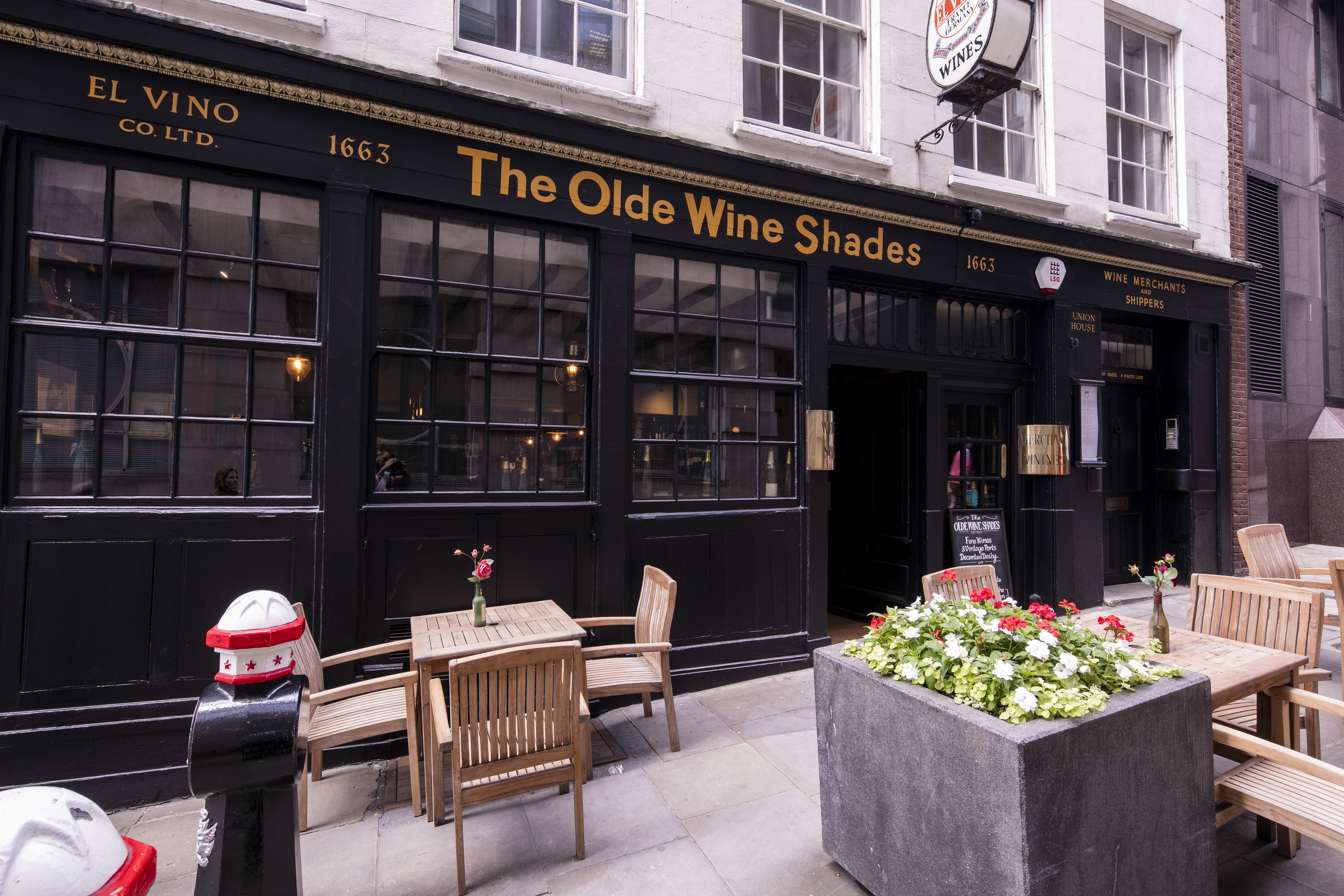
The Old Wine Shades

The Olde Wine Shades is one of London's oldest public houses, having been built in 1663 in Martin Lane there is an oft quoted claim that it somehow survived the Great Fire of 1666. Its origins were as a Merchants house, which had a tunnel river entrance like many larger riverside properties in London at the time. The tunnel was sealed after bomb damage during the Blitz in 1940, but its entrance is still visible today. The architectural and historic significance of the Olde Wine Shades is recognised in its status as a grade II listed building.

El Vino was purchased by Davy's Wine Merchants in 2015 and it had a major refurbishment in the summer of 2017, restoring many original features and allowing the cellar bar area to be opened to the public once again.

Martha Grimes named one of her Richard Jury novels after the pub.

== See also ==
- List of buildings that survived the Great Fire of London
