= Prince Henry's Room =

Historic room in the City of London

Coordinates: 51°30′50″N 0°6′39″W

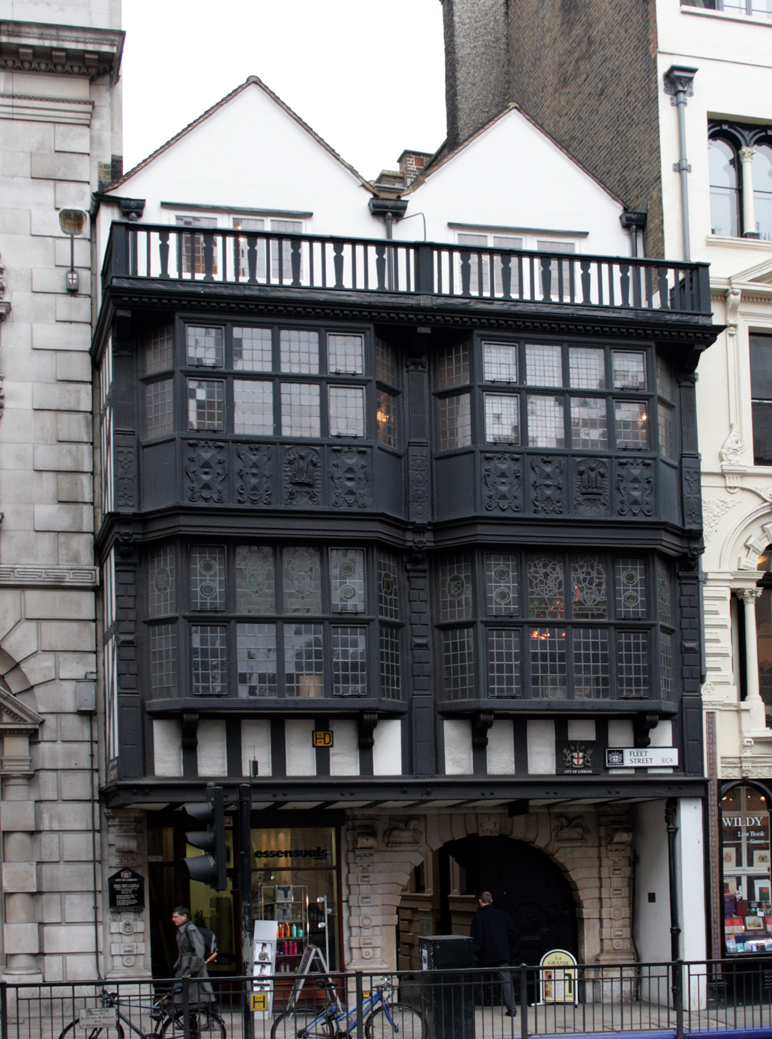
17 Fleet Street

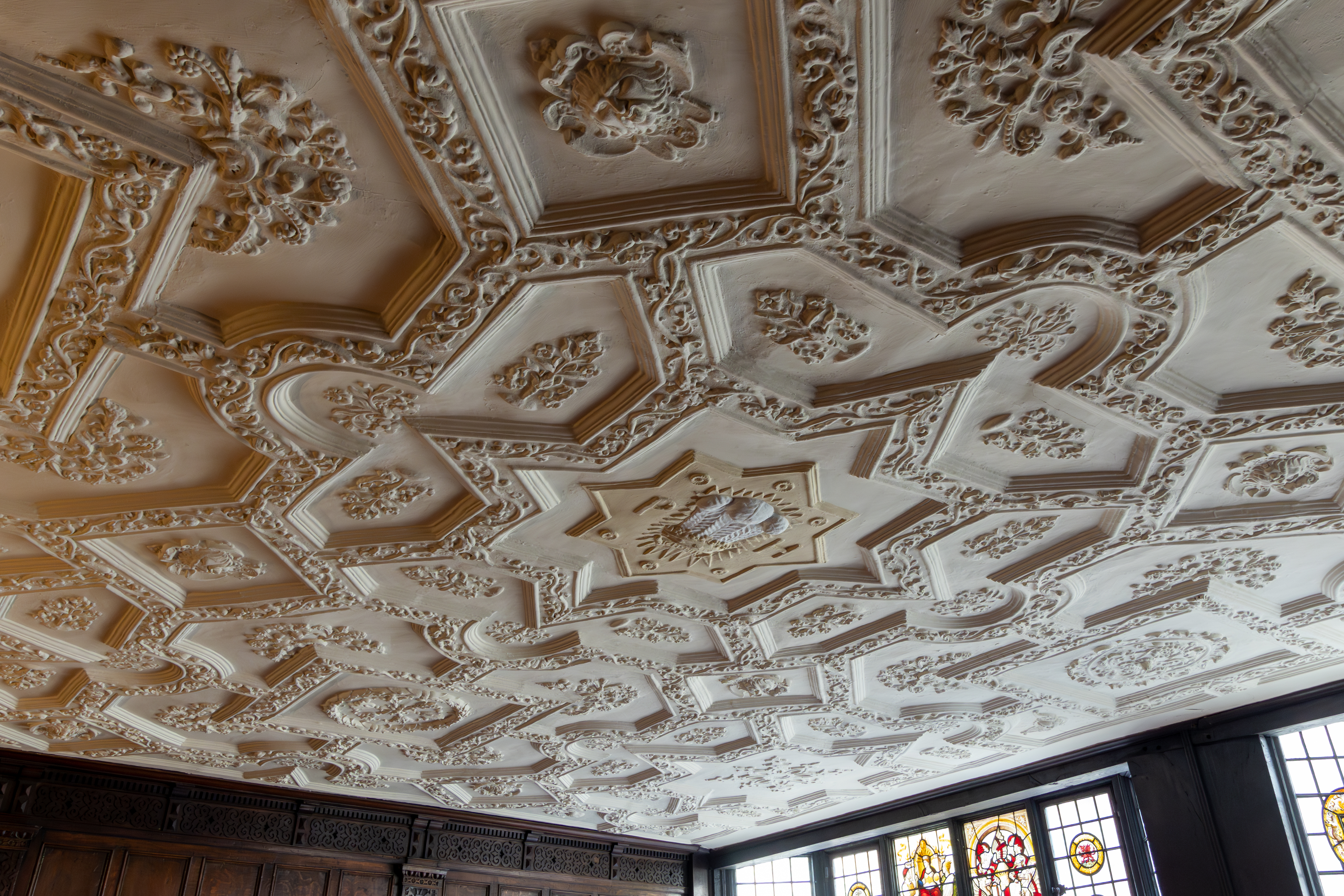
The decorated plaster ceiling with the Prince of Wales's feathers in the centre

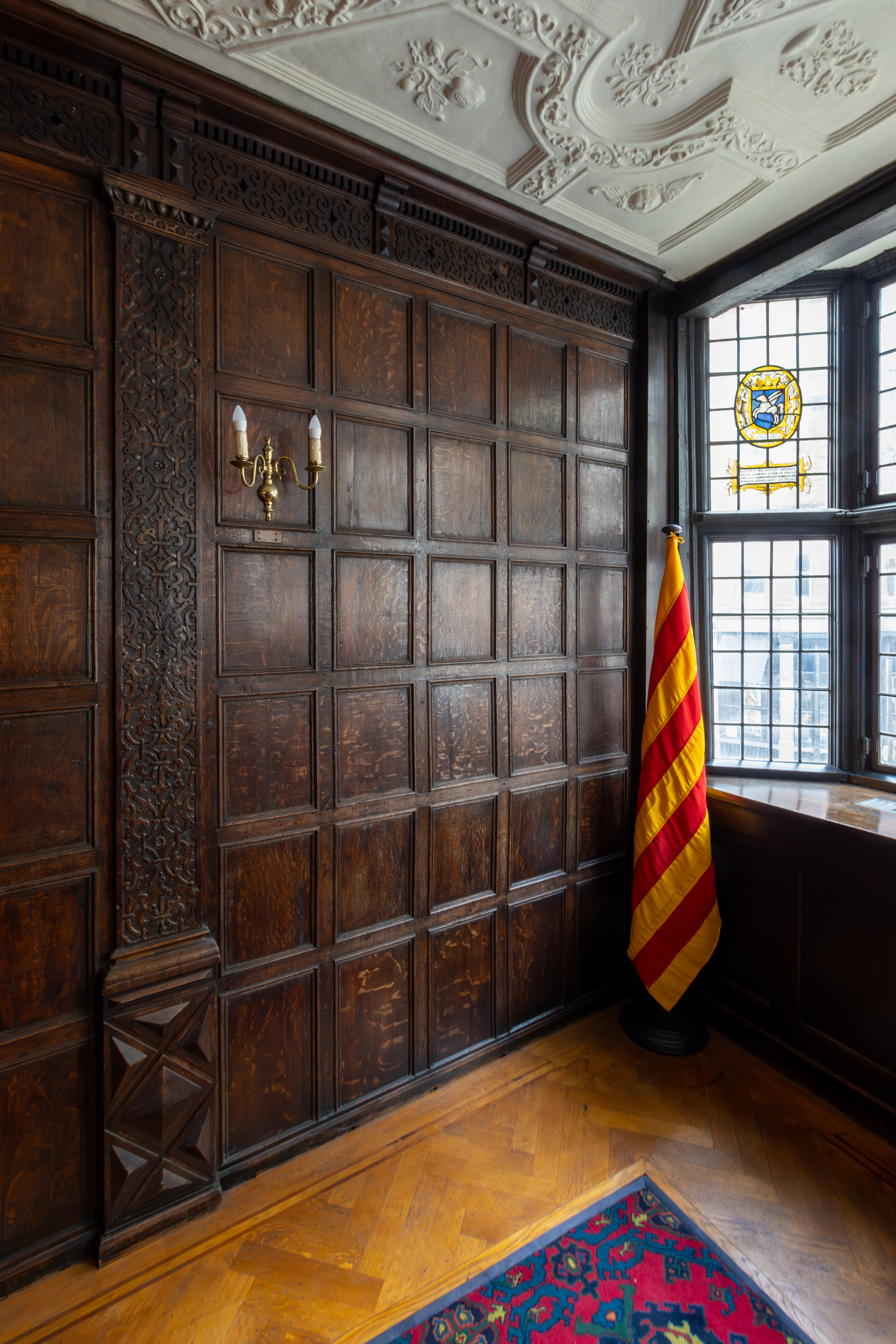
Original Jacobean wood panelling

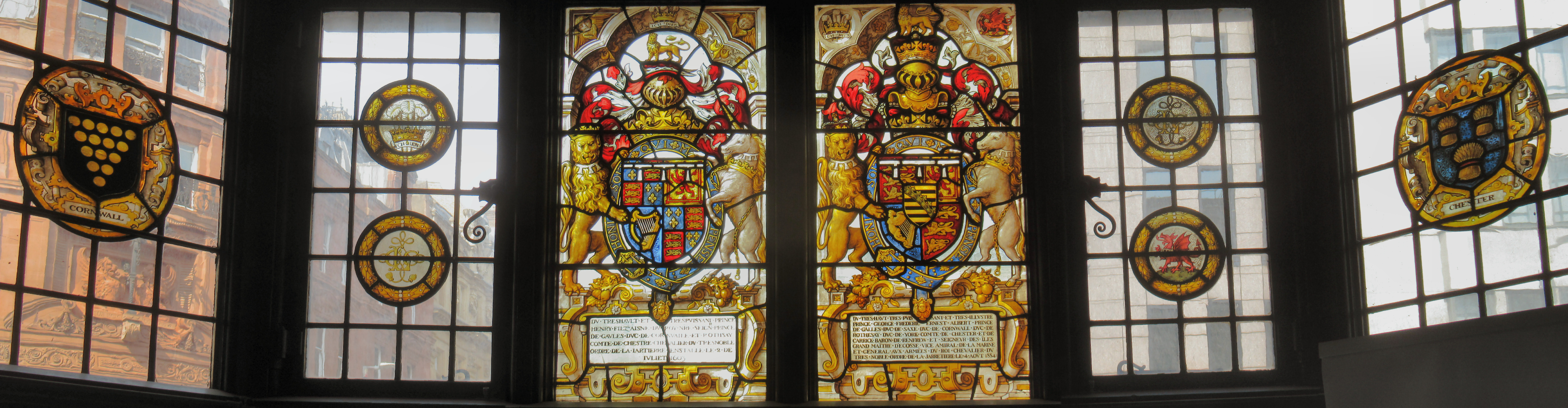
East "Royal" window of the room

Prince Henry's Room is situated on the first floor at the front of No. 17 Fleet Street, London. The house is one of the few surviving buildings in the City of London dating from before the Great Fire of London in 1666. It is a Grade II* listed building.

== History ==
The site was once owned by the Templars, but after the dissolution of the Order of St John, the building was rebuilt in 1610 and became a tavern called Prince's Arms. This coincided with the investiture of Prince Henry, son of James I, as Prince of Wales. During the 17th century, the house was known as the Fountain Inn and was visited by Samuel Pepys on 14 October 1661.

He wrote "In the afternoon Captain Ferrers and I walked abroad to several places; among others, to Mr. Pim's my Lord's tailors and there he went out with us to the Fountain tavern and did give us store of wine." On 28 November 1661, Pepys wrote "to the Fountain tavern and there stayed till 12 at night, drinking and singing, Mr. Symons and one Mr. Agar singing very well. Then Mr. Gauden, being almost drunk, had the wit to be gone; and so I took leave too"

Lord Thurlow frequented the place before he went on to practise law in the 1770s. It later became a hairdresser's and a plaque used to state it was once the home or palace of Henry VIII also Cardinal Wolsey lived there. The enriched ceiling was plastered with a"P" triple plumed. Once the Management of the Duchy of Cornwall held their sittings here in the time of Charles I, on or about 1619 (see Mrs Green's "Calendar of State Papers").

During the early 19th century a famous exhibition Mrs Salmon's Waxworks was held in the front part of the house, whilst the tavern continued in the rear. The house became the property of the London County Council in 1900 with the aid of a contribution from the City of London Corporation. It later passed to the City of London Corporation.

From 1975, the room was a museum which hosted a Samuel Pepys exhibition — Pepys was born in Fleet Street in 1633. The Samuel Pepys Club financed much of the original exhibition. The museum was closed to the public after a decade or so and is now empty of all furniture.

The building now houses the offices of the Delegation of the Catalonian Regional Government to the UK.

Prince Henry's Room is currently only viewable when special events are held there. It was opened to the public for one day for the September 2023 London Open House Festival and received over 700 visitors. The City of London Corporation has recently completed a consultation with interested parties regarding the room's usage.

== Architectural features ==
The main feature is the fine and rare highly decorated Jacobean plaster ceiling, with the Prince of Wales's feathers and the initials "PH" in the centre. There is one wall of original Jacobean wood panelling left; the other panelling is Georgian. The unexceptional fireplace has a wood surround and panelling above, with an inscription above recording the connection with the diarist and great naval administrator, Samuel Pepys. There are also fine leaded lights with coats of arms and badges, best seen from within the room.

== See also ==
- List of buildings that survived the Great Fire of London
