= Cripplegate =

Ward of the City of London

Coordinates: 51.518087°N 0.0931473°W

- Ward
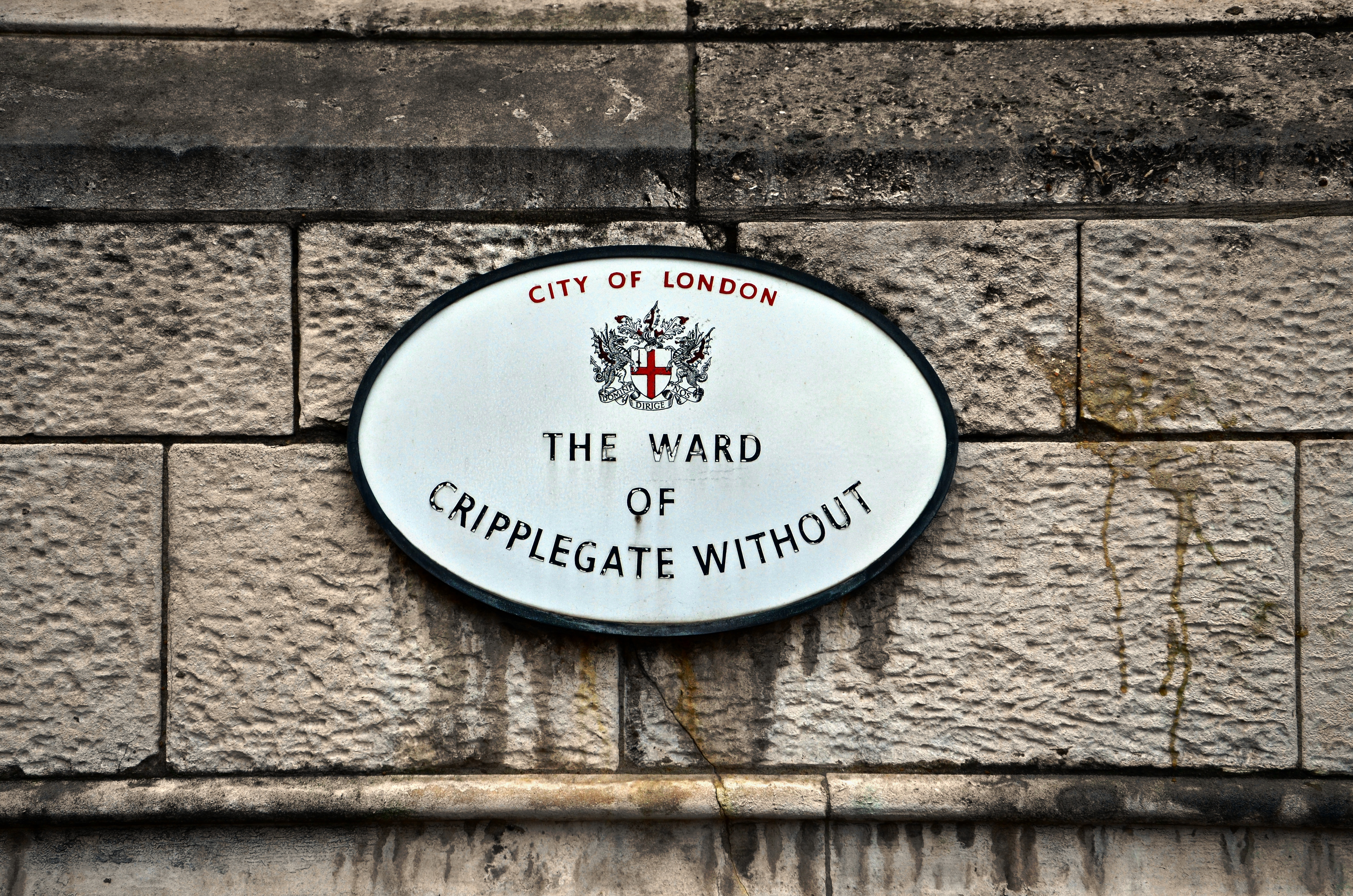

- Location within Greater London
- Cripplegate ward boundaries since 2013
- Population: 2,782 (2011 Census. Ward)
- OS grid reference: TQ327811
- Sui generis: City of London
- Administrative area: Greater London
- Region: London
- Country: England
- Sovereign state: United Kingdom
- Post town: LONDON
- Postcode district: EC2
- Dialling code: 020
- Police: City of London
- Fire: London
- Ambulance: London
- UK Parliament: Cities of London and Westminster
- London Assembly: City and East

Cripplegate was a gate in the London Wall which once enclosed the City of London, England.

The Cripplegate gate lent its name to the Cripplegate ward of the City, which encompasses the area where the gate and the former city wall once stood. The ward is divided into two parts: Cripplegate Within and Cripplegate Without, a division that originated from the gate and wall. Each part has a designated beadle and a deputy (alderman). Following boundary changes in 1994 (City) and 2003 (ward), the majority of the ward now falls within Cripplegate Without, as the ward of Bassishaw has expanded significantly into the Cripplegate Within area.

Until World War II, the area approximating to Cripplegate Without was commonly known as simply Cripplegate. The area was almost entirely destroyed in the Blitz of World War II, causing the term to fall out of colloquial speech. Cripplegate Without is the site of the Barbican Estate and Barbican Centre, with a small part of these lying in neighbouring Aldersgate Without.

== The gate ==
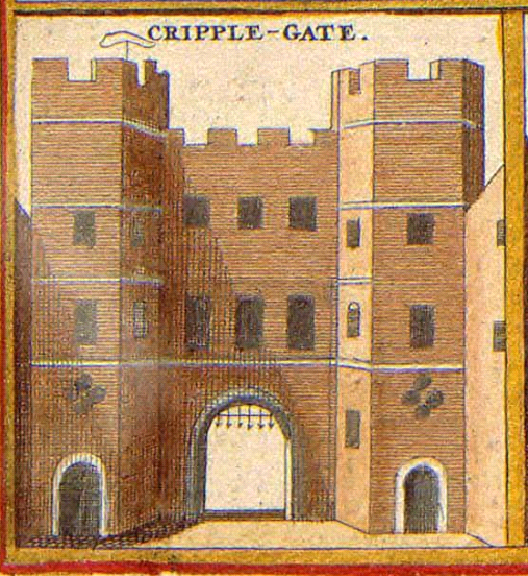
An illustration of the gate, c. 1650.

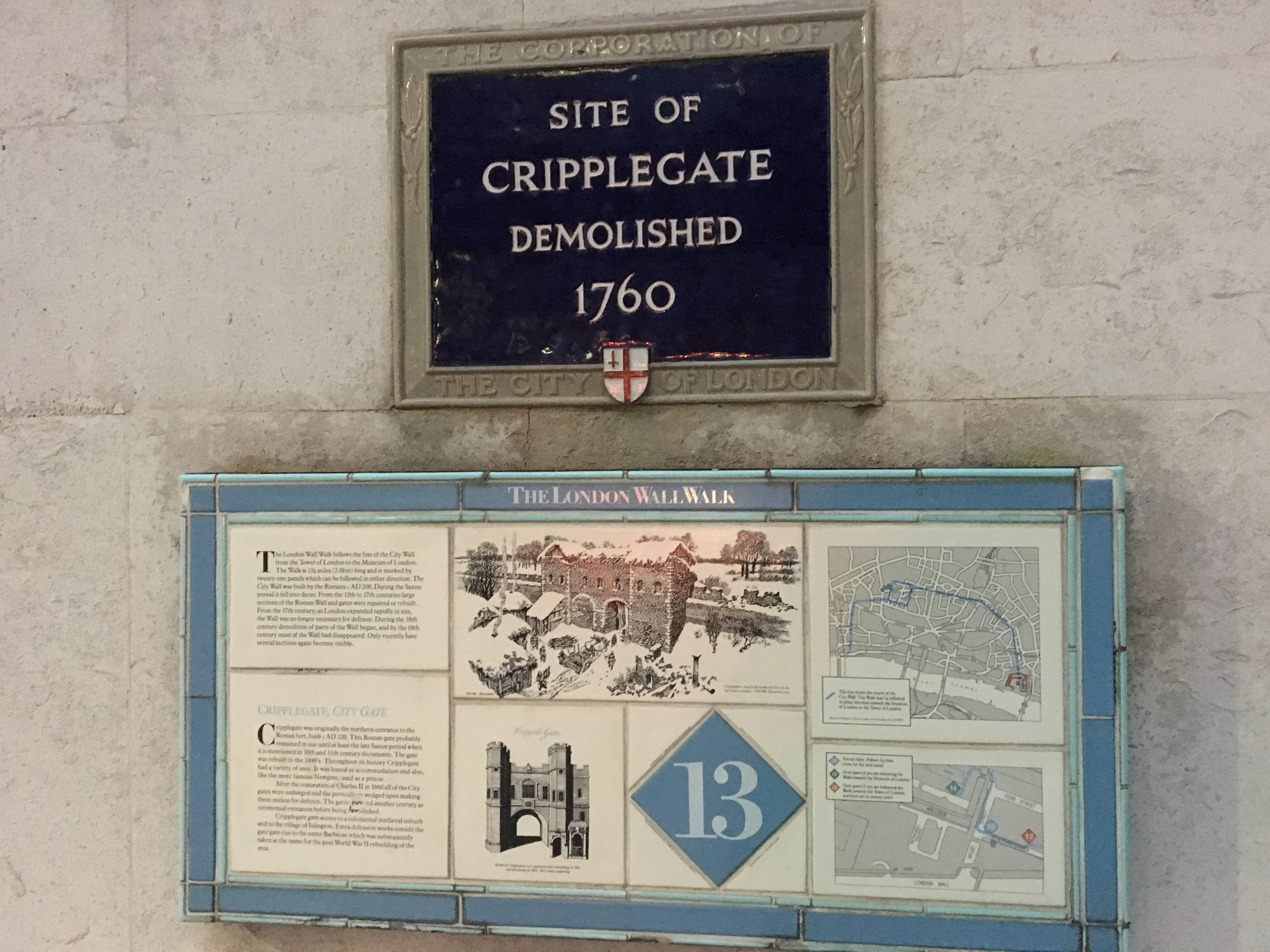
Cripplegate plaque

The origins of the gate's name are unclear. One theory, bolstered by a mentioning of the gate in the fourth law code of Æthelred the Unready and a charter of William the Conqueror from 1068 under the name "Crepelgate", is that it takes its name from the Anglo-Saxon word crepel, meaning a covered or underground passageway.

Another unsubstantiated theory suggests it is named after the cripples who used to beg there. The name of the nearby medieval church of St Giles-without-Cripplegate lends credence to this suggestion as Saint Giles is the patron saint of cripples and lepers.

=== History of the gate ===
It was initially the northern gate to the Roman city walls, built around AD 120 or 150, eighty years before the rest of the wall was completed. It appeared to have been used as part of the Roman city walls until at least the 10th-11th centuries. Cripplegate was rebuilt during the 1490s and was unhinged and fortified with a portcullis after Charles II became king in 1660. It was eventually demolished in 1760; much of Cripplegate was gone by the 19th century and only small fragments of it survive today.

== The ward ==
Location within the City, after the 21st century boundary changes

Ancient boundaries of the City Wards, prior to 2003

Cripplegate is one of the 25 ancient wards of the City of London, each electing an alderman to the Court of Aldermen and commoners (the City equivalent of a councillor) to the Court of Common Council of the City of London Corporation. Only electors who are Freemen of the City are eligible to stand. In the early 12th century, the area was originally referred to as Alwoldii which was probably the name of the current alderman. The early records are unreliable as regards who the Aldermen were, but from 1286 there is a more reliable list of Aldermen available.

The modern City of London spreads across a square mile of land and remains divided into 25 geographic areas, or 'wards'. Four of these wards (Aldersgate, Portsoken, Queenhithe and Cripplegate), are described as 'residential' as they contain the vast majority of all City residents.

=== Geography ===
The Ward of Cripplegate provides part of the Northern edge of the City and stretches from just below Old Street, down to London Wall at its southern tip, where it meets the Ward of Bassishaw. To the west is the Ward of Aldersgate and on the Eastern edge is Coleman Street.

The 2003 Ward Boundary Review recommended some significant changes for a number of wards and these were eventually implemented in 2013.

The Cripplegate Ward boundary used to extend a great deal further south, all the way down to Cheapside in fact. The ward was home to the halls of six livery companies and now only one remains (the Barber-Surgeons in Monkwell Square).

Each ward is represented by an assembly called the 'Court of Common Council'. This consists of 100 common councilmen and 25 alderman (one for each Ward). The number of councilmen allocated to each particular ward is based on the size of the electorate and where Cripplegate used to warrant twelve members of council it is now reduced to nine.

The ward is promoted by the Cripplegate Ward Club. Founded in 1878, The Cripplegate Ward Club is a social organisation, encouraging its members to take an interest in the civic affairs of the City, while also supporting appeals and charitable activities. Cripplegate is among the busiest of the 20-plus ward clubs in the City of London, with a varied programme of events throughout the year.

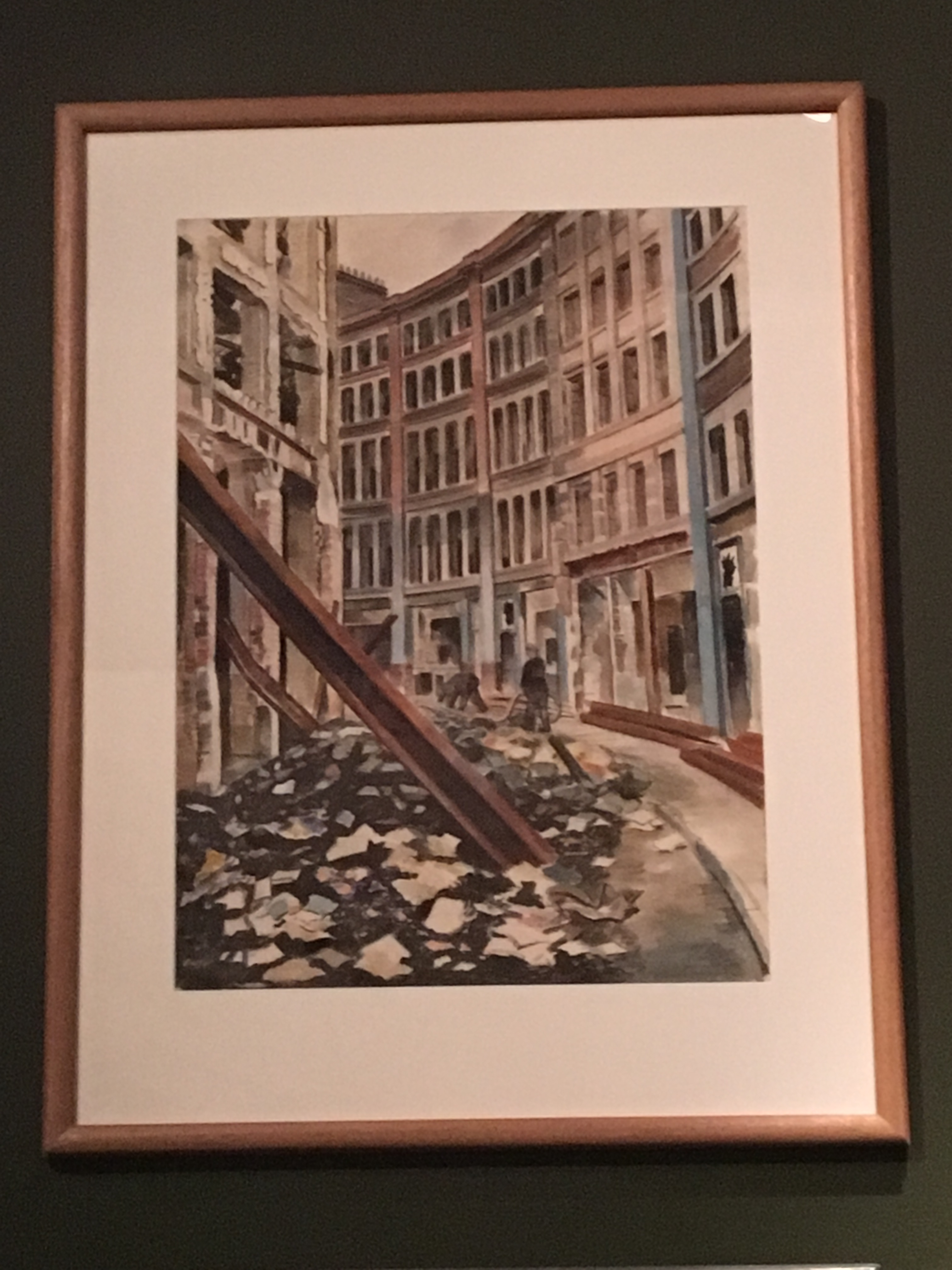
Jewin Crescent painting at the Imperial War Museum

The gate's name is preserved in the church of St Giles-without-Cripplegate which is sited immediately outside the site of the former gate.

A small road named Cripplegate Street lies slightly to the north of the site of the gate between Viscount Street and Bridgewater Street.

=== History of the ward ===
The wards of London appear to have taken shape in the 11th century, before the Norman Conquest. Their administrative, judicial and military purpose made them equivalent to Hundreds in the countryside. The primary purpose of wards like Cripplegate, which included a gate, appears to have been the defence of the gate, as gates were the weakest points in any fortification.

Cripplegate Without was, in the 11th, 12th and possibly later centuries, part of an area outside the northern wall called the Soke of Cripplegate, held by the church of St. Martin's Le Grand.

In 1068, a burial site, where Jewin Street now stands, was the only place in England where Jews were permitted to be buried. Those living elsewhere in the country were forced, at great expense and inconvenience, to bring their dead there.

The philosopher Thomas More, writer of Utopia, was born on Milk Street in 1478.

In 1555, John Gresham endowed the new Gresham's School in Norfolk with three tenements in the parish of St. Giles Without Cripplegate, including 'The White Hind' and 'The Peacock'.

During the Second World War, the Cripplegate area, a centre of the rag trade, was virtually destroyed and by 1951 the resident population of the City stood at only 5,324, of whom 48 lived in Cripplegate. Discussions began in 1952 about the future of the area, and the decision to build new residential properties was taken by the Court of Common Council on 19 September 1957. The area was reopened as the Barbican Estate in 1969.

Tranter's Hotel was located at 6–9 Bridgewater Square, in a Georgian building with 60 rooms available, not far from today's Beech Street, before being destroyed by the World War II bombs.

It was advertised in a number of periodicals and magazines between 1887 and 1919 as a very centrally located, family and commercial, temperance-friendly hotel, convenient for St Paul's Cathedral and Aldersgate station, for business and pleasure.

=== Politics ===
Current elected representatives in Cripplegate are David Graves (Alderman), Mark Bostock, David Bradshaw, Mary Durcan, Vivienne Littlechild, Susan Pearson, William Pimlott, Stephen Quilter and John Tomlinson.

In the 2017 City-wide Common Council elections, the Labour Party won two seats in Cripplegate ward with local residents Mary Durcan and William Pimlott making Labour gains. The Labour Party won a record total of five seats on the Common Council in March 2017 winning two seats in Portsoken, two seats in Cripplegate ward and one seat in Aldersgate ward.

Following a boundary change in 1994, the Golden Lane Estate was transferred from Islington to the City, and so Cripplegate is today the most populous of the four residential wards of the City, with a population of 2,782 (2011).

== Other uses ==
=== Cripplegate Foundation ===
Cripplegate Foundation is a registered charity and local grant-making foundation supporting residents in the London borough of Islington and a small area of the City of London. The Foundation's vision is of a society where everyone can live a rewarding and fulfilled life, free from poverty and inequality.

Cripplegate Foundation works to improve access to opportunities for everyone and to make lasting change. They do this by:

- listening to, and learning from, local people and communities,
- raising funds and making grants, and
- working in partnership with local people and organisations.

As a place-based funder, Cripplegate Foundation's grants and programmes are available to Islington groups and residents based on their respective criteria. These include Islington Council's Community Chest, Islington’s Resident Support Scheme (RSS), the Catalyst Programme, and Islington Giving funds.

As well as awarding grants, Cripplegate Foundation offers a range of resources to Islington’s residents and voluntary organisations. These include innovative and practical research, advice and support, How Not What, a key outcome of the Development Partner programme, and office space available for booking by Islington voluntary groups.

=== History of Cripplegate Foundation ===
The Foundation dates its origins to the donation of £40 "to provide trousers for local people" on 2 April 1500. However it was only in 1891 that various local trusts were consolidated into the Cripplegate Foundation by the London Parochial Charities Act. Between 1896 and 1973 the foundation ran the Cripplegate Institute at the southern end of Golden Lane, a handsome 'peoples palace' designed by architect Sidney Smith which contained a theatre and concert hall, a library free to residents and offices for social workers and from which grants to groups and individuals were given. The building was listed in 1987 but was sold by the Foundation and subsequently completely gutted by Swiss Bank UBS for its own offices. From 1 April 2008 the area of benefit was expanded to include Islington. John Gilbert is the chair of the foundation, having been on the board of governors since 2005.

=== Cripplegate Bank ===
The Cripplegate Savings Bank was established in 1819 as a joint stock bank, then re-registered as Cripplegate Bank Ltd in 1879, and finally renamed London, Commercial & Cripplegate Bank Ltd in 1900. In between 1876-1906 the Cripplegate Bank was located at 31 and then 1 Whitecross Street, before been incorporated into the Union Bank of London, and finally been liquidated.

== In popular culture ==
The second wedding in the film Four Weddings and a Funeral takes place in the fictional church of St. Mary of the Fields, Cripplegate, EC2. It was filmed in the chapel of the Royal Naval College, Greenwich.

Cripplegate makes an appearance in the 2020 video game, Assassin's Creed: Valhalla as one of the restricted areas in London.

Alan Moore's novel The Great When features a scene set during the German bombing that destroyed Cripplegate during the Second World War.

== See also ==
- Fortifications of London
- London
- Morning Exercises
- Grub Street
