= St Giles-without-Cripplegate =

Church in the Barbican, London, England

Coordinates: 51°31′7.38″N 0°5′38.55″W

- Church of Saint Giles without Cripplegate
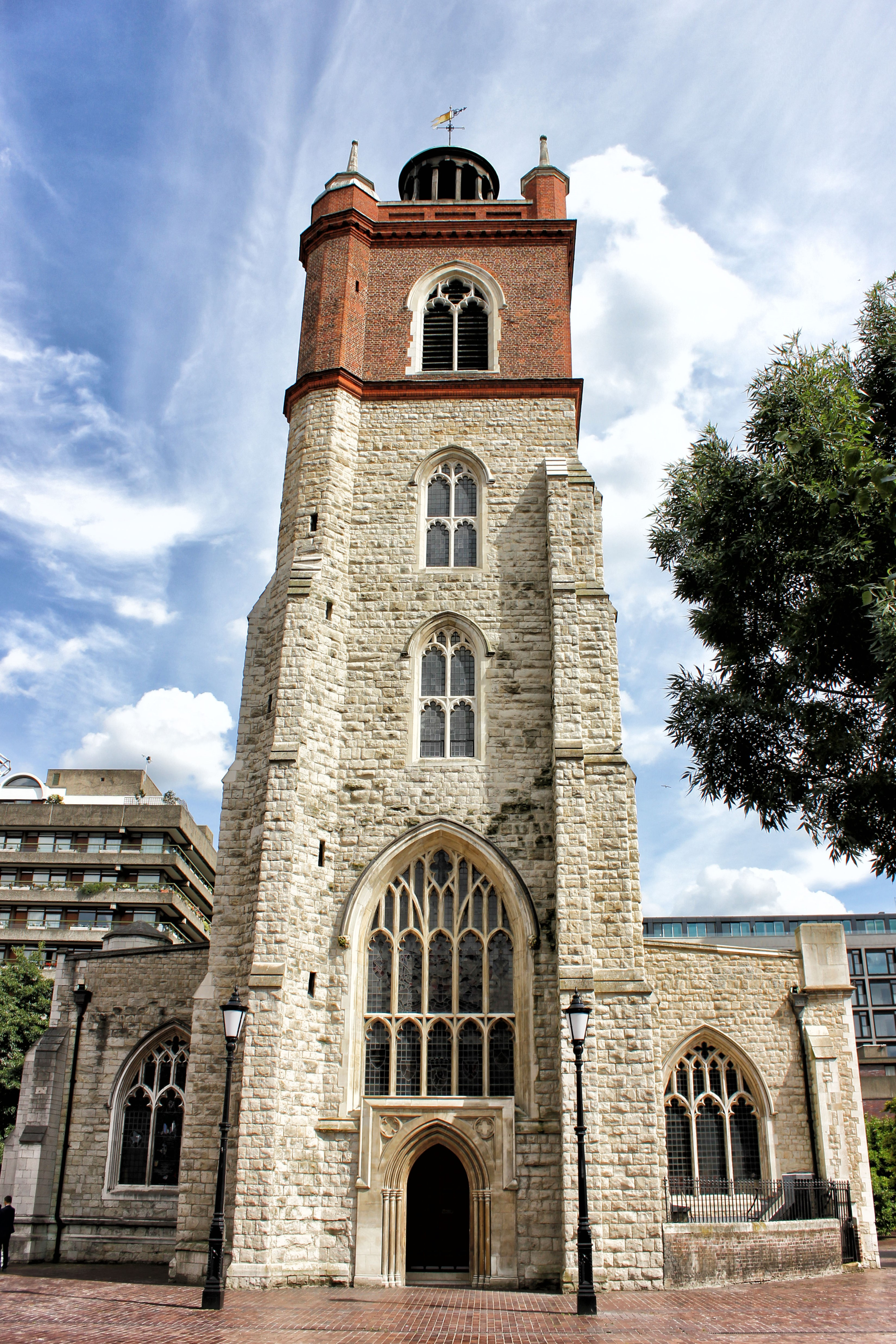
- The west tower of St Giles-without-Cripplegate

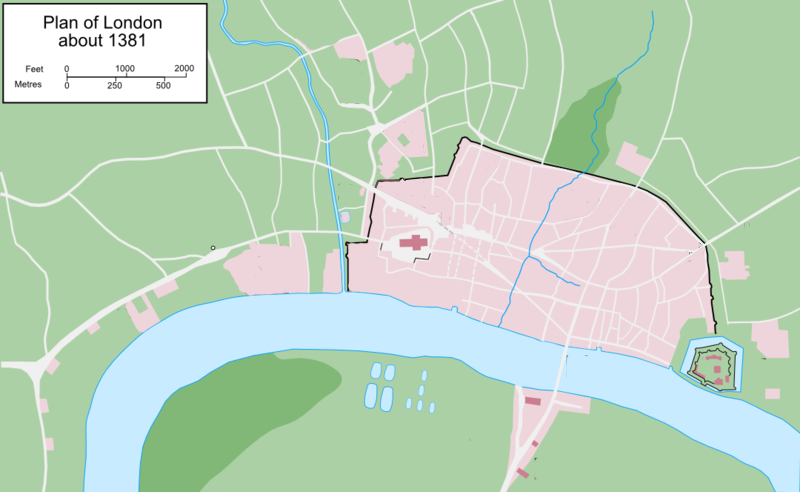
- Location within City of London Location within City of London in 1300
- Location: Fore Street, Barbican, London, EC2
- Country: England
- Language: English
- Denomination: Church of England
- Previous denomination: Roman Catholic (to 1534)
- Website: stgileschurch.com

History
- Status: Active
- Founded: 11th century or earlier
- Dedication: Giles the Hermit

Architecture
- Heritage designation: Grade I listed building
- Style: Perpendicular Gothic

Administration
- Diocese: London
- Parish: St Giles' with St Luke's

Clergy
- Rector: The Rev'd Canon Jack Noble

St Giles-without-Cripplegate is an Anglican church in the City of London, located on Fore Street within the modern Barbican complex. When built it stood without (that is, outside) the city wall, near the Cripplegate. The name is often shortened in informal use to St Giles Cripplegate. The church is dedicated to St Giles, the patron saint of disabled and infirm people of many different kinds. It is one of the few medieval churches left in the City of London, having survived the Great Fire of 1666.

== History ==
There had been a Saxon church on the site in the 11th century but by 1090 it had been replaced by a Norman one. In 1394 it was rebuilt in the perpendicular gothic style during the reign of Richard II. The stone tower was added in 1682.

[1545] The xii day of September at iiii of cloke in the mornynge was sent Gylles church at Creppyl gatte burnyd, alle hole save the walles, stepull, belles and alle, and how it came God knoweth.

— Chronicle of the Grey Friars of London, 1852

The church has been badly damaged by fire on three occasions: In 1545, in 1897 and during an air raid of the Blitz of the Second World War. German bombs completely gutted the church but it was restored using the plans of the reconstruction of 1545. A new ring of twelve bells was cast by Mears and Stainbank in 1954, and this was augmented with a sharp second bell cast in 2006 by the Whitechapel Bell Foundry. The historic pews, altar and font come from the nearby St Luke Old Street, and were transferred to St Giles when it closed and the parishes were amalgamated in 1959.

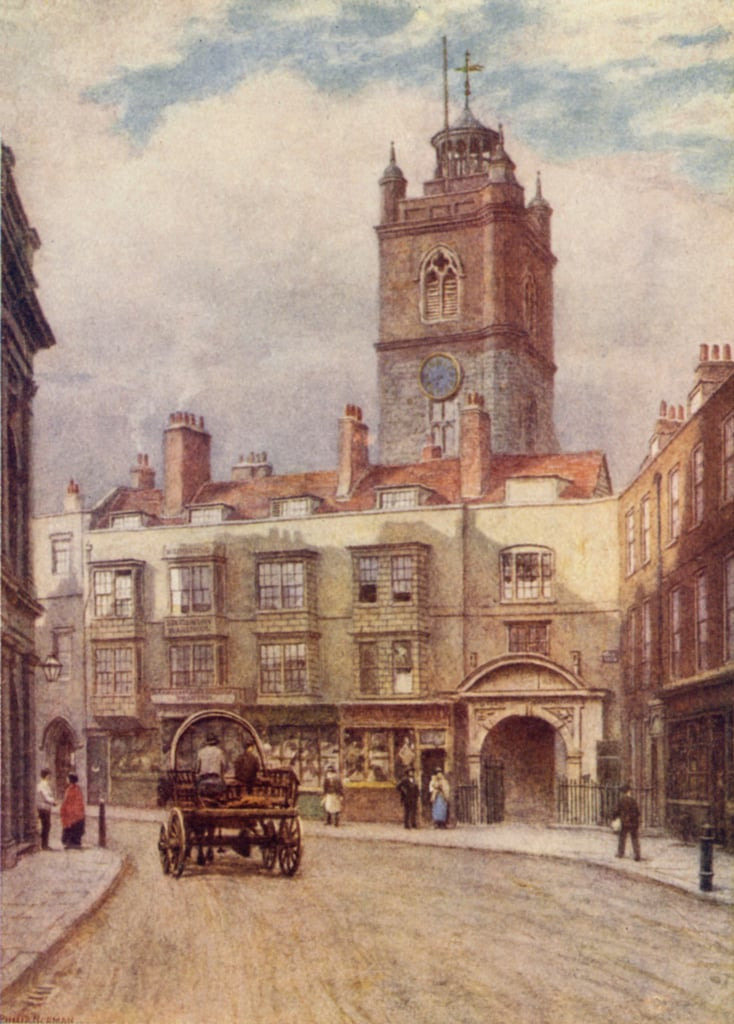
Tower of Church of St Giles, Cripplegate, and Old Houses in Fore Street, 1884 by Philip Norman

The church was designated a Grade I listed building on 4 January 1950.

== Notable people associated with the church ==
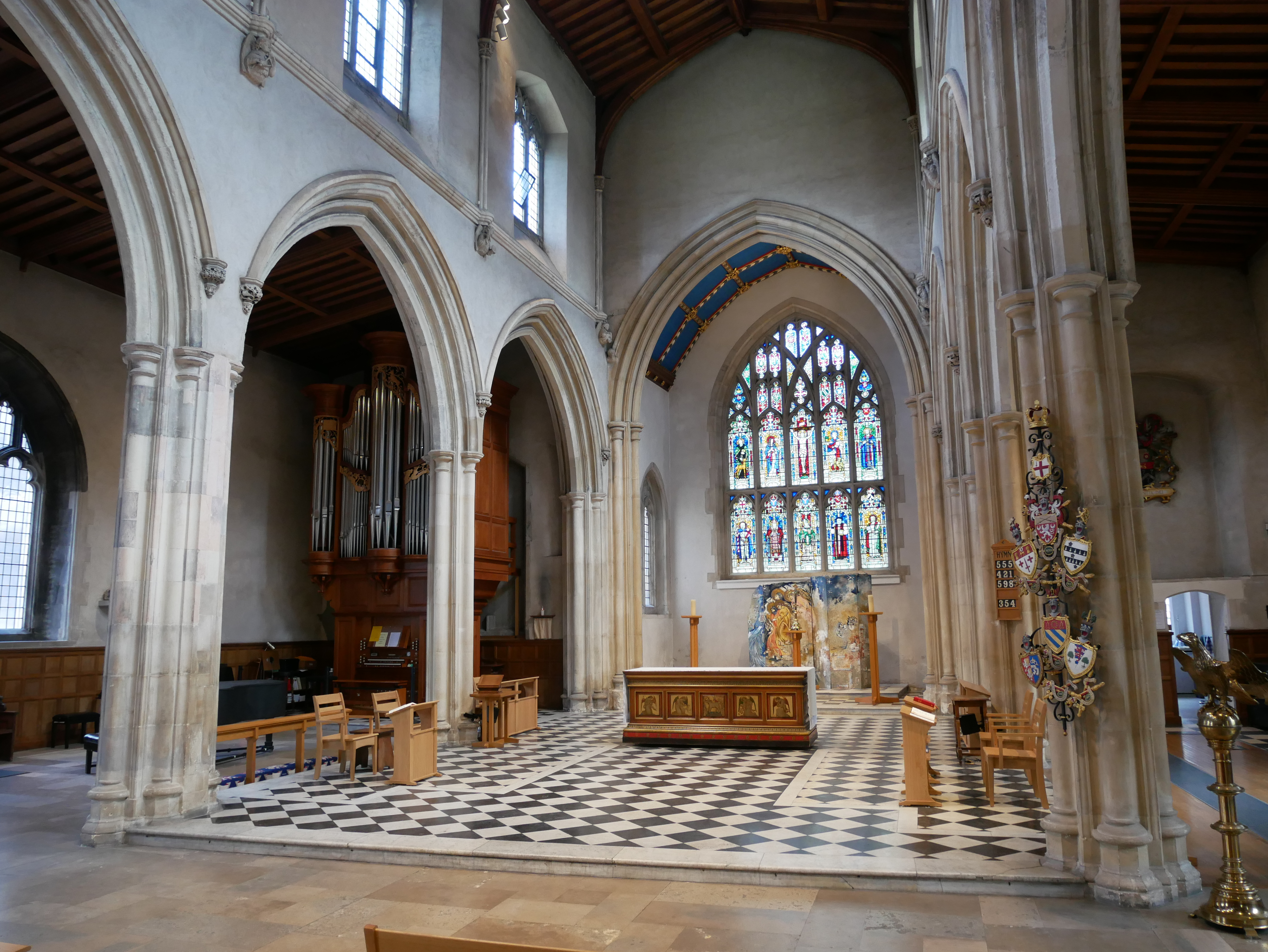
The chancel of the Church of St Giles Cripplegate

- John Field, curate of the church, c. 1570
- John Foxe, author of the Book of Martyrs, surrogate for Crowley c. 1565 and buried in the church, 1587
- Robert Crowley, rector of St Giles's and Protestant polemicist was buried in the church in 1588
- Thomas Deloney, English novelist and balladist, had his son baptised in the church in 1586
- Lancelot Andrewes, rector of the church after Crowley
- Roger Townshend, buried in the church in 1590
- Sir Martin Frobisher, captain who fought against the Spanish Armada, buried in the church, 1595
- Sir Francis Willoughby, industrialist and coalowner, buried in the church in 1596
- Nathaniel Eaton, first schoolmaster of Harvard College, baptised in the church in 1610
- Oliver Cromwell, military commander and Lord Protector of England during the Commonwealth, married Elizabeth Bourchier in the church, 1620
- Nicholas Tooley, Shakespearean actor, shareholder in the Globe Theatre, buried 5 June 1623
- John Speed, author of the Theatre of the Empire of Great Britaine, buried in the church in 1629
- Henry Welby (died 1636), an English gentleman, known for living as a recluse, was buried in the church on 20 October 1636
- John Milton, author of Paradise Lost, buried in the church in 1674
- John Bunyan, author of The Pilgrim's Progress, attended the church
- Daniel Defoe, author of Robinson Crusoe, died in the parish, 1731
- Mark Catesby, naturalist, artist, and author of Natural History of Carolina, Florida and the Bahama Islands (1729–1747), was a parishioner and several of his children were baptised in the church, and later buried in the churchyard
- Rick Wakeman, keyboardist, recorded his track "Jane Seymour" (from The Six Wives of Henry VIII) and the pipe organ parts in the third section of Yes track "Close to the Edge" using the pipe organ in the church
- Jack Nitzsche, composer, pianist, recorded "St. Giles Cripplegate" with the London Symphony Orchestra in 1972

== Layout of the church ==
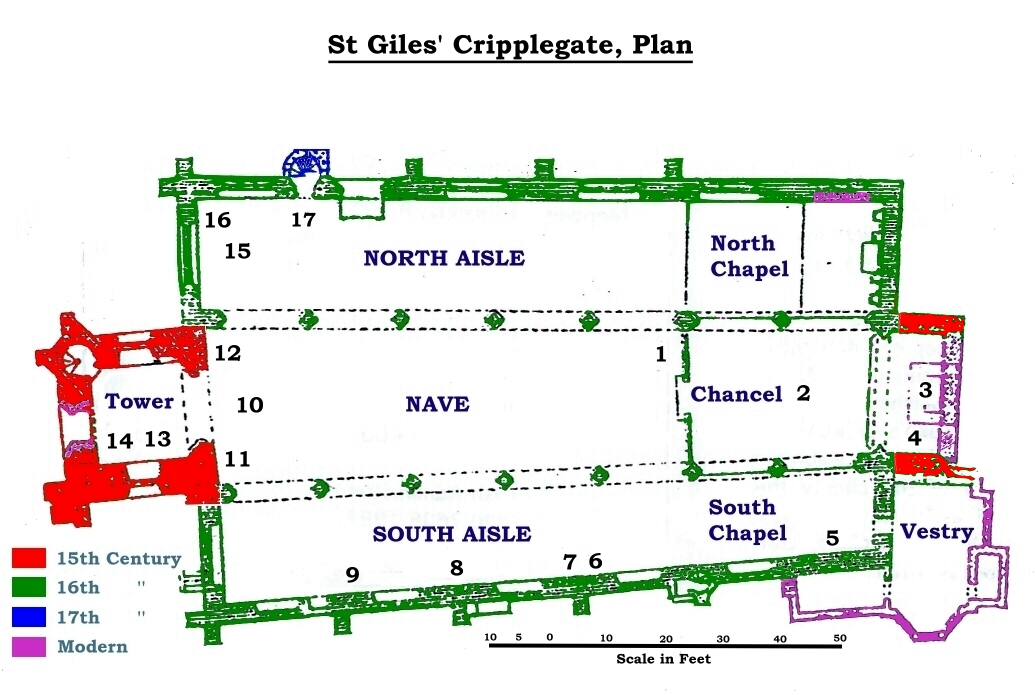
Interior of St Giles Cripplegate

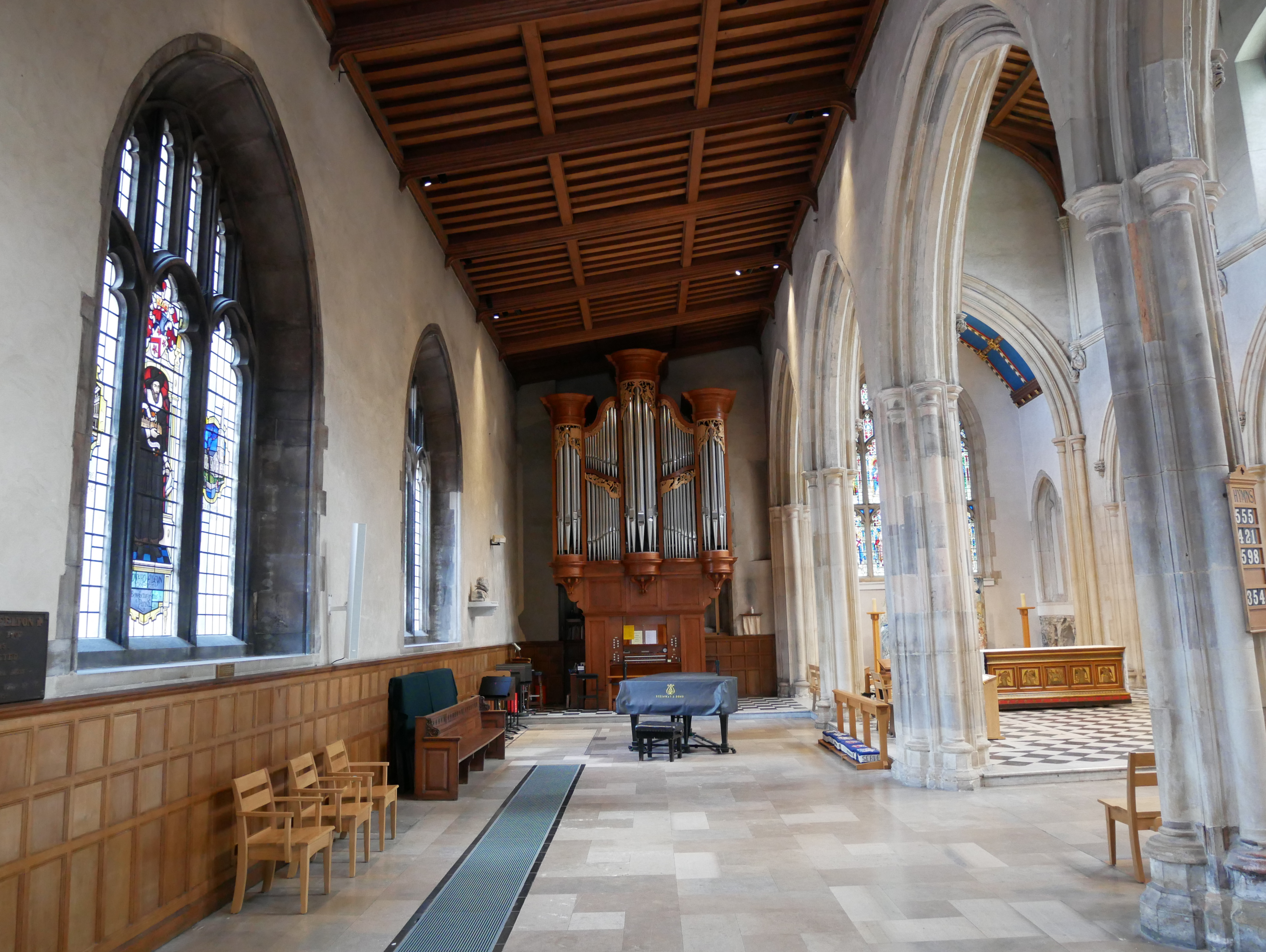
The north aisle of the church

1. John Milton buried here in 1674
2. The altar from St. Luke's, Old Street, which was dismantled in the 1960s due to subsidence.
3. The east window. Installed 1960. Designed by Gerald Smith of the Nicholson Studios, following the pattern of the original medieval window.
4. Sedilia (where the priest sat) and piscina of the medieval church.
5. Display cabinet containing the historic treasures of Cripplegate.
6. John Foxe, author of "The Book of Martyrs" is buried here.
7. Plaque commemorating Sir Martin Frobisher, explorer and sea Captain.
8. Bust of John Speed, map maker and historian.
9. Statue of John Milton by Horace Montford
10. The organ. From St. Luke's, Old Street
11. Bust of Daniel Defoe, author of "Robinson Crusoe" and John Milton.
12. Busts of Oliver Cromwell and John Bunyan, author of "Pilgrim's Progress".
13. Portrait of Dr. William Nicholls, the first Rector of St. Luke's Church and Vicar of St. Giles'.
14. The West Window – shows the coats of arms of the Archbishop of Canterbury, the Bishop of London, Milton, Cromwell and Frobisher.
15. The font – from St. Luke's Church.
16. The Cripplegate Window which celebrates the centenary of the charity The Cripplegate Foundation.
17. Bust of Sir William Staines, Lord Mayor of London in 1801.

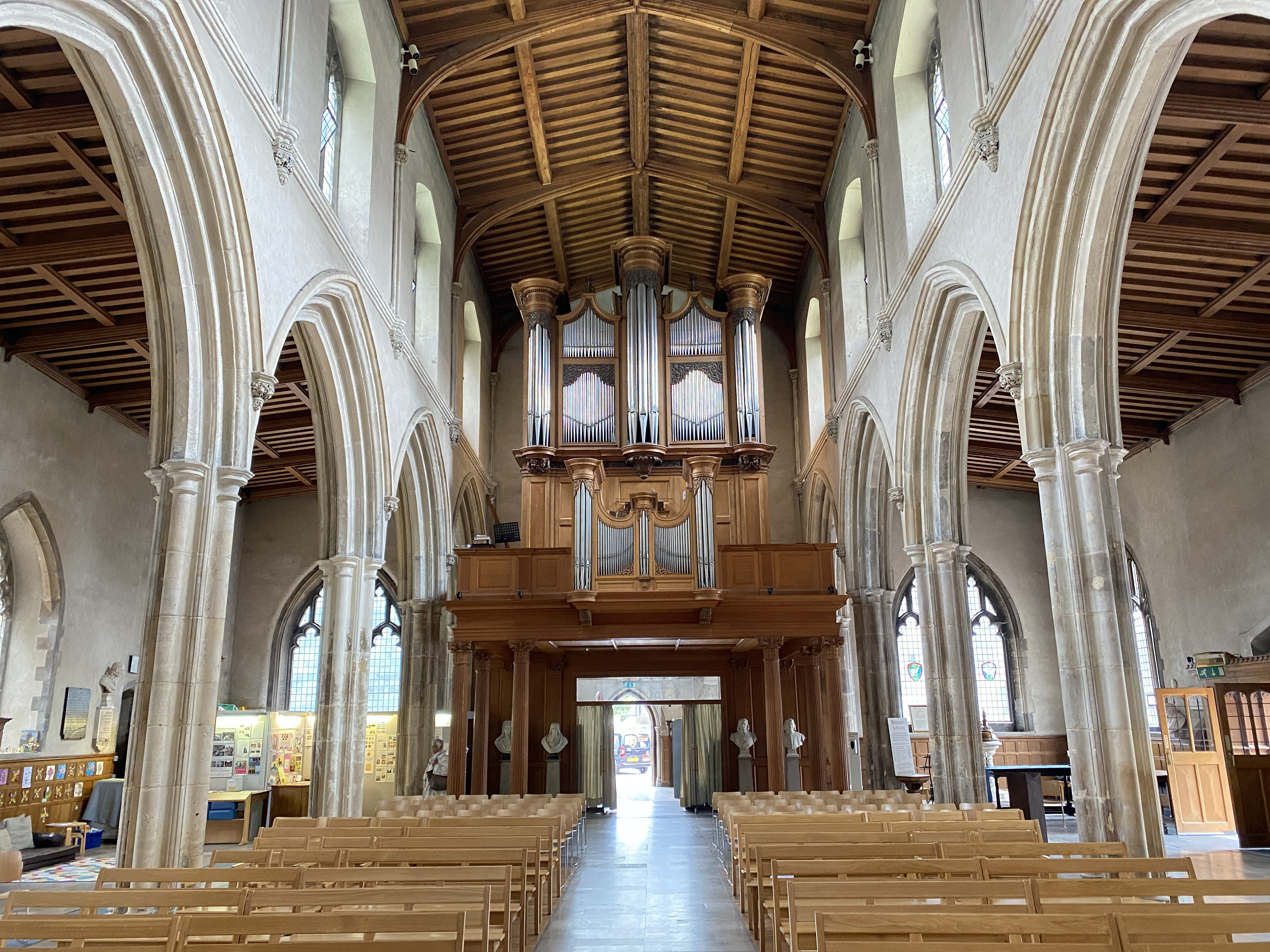
View of the nave looking west.

== Gallery ==
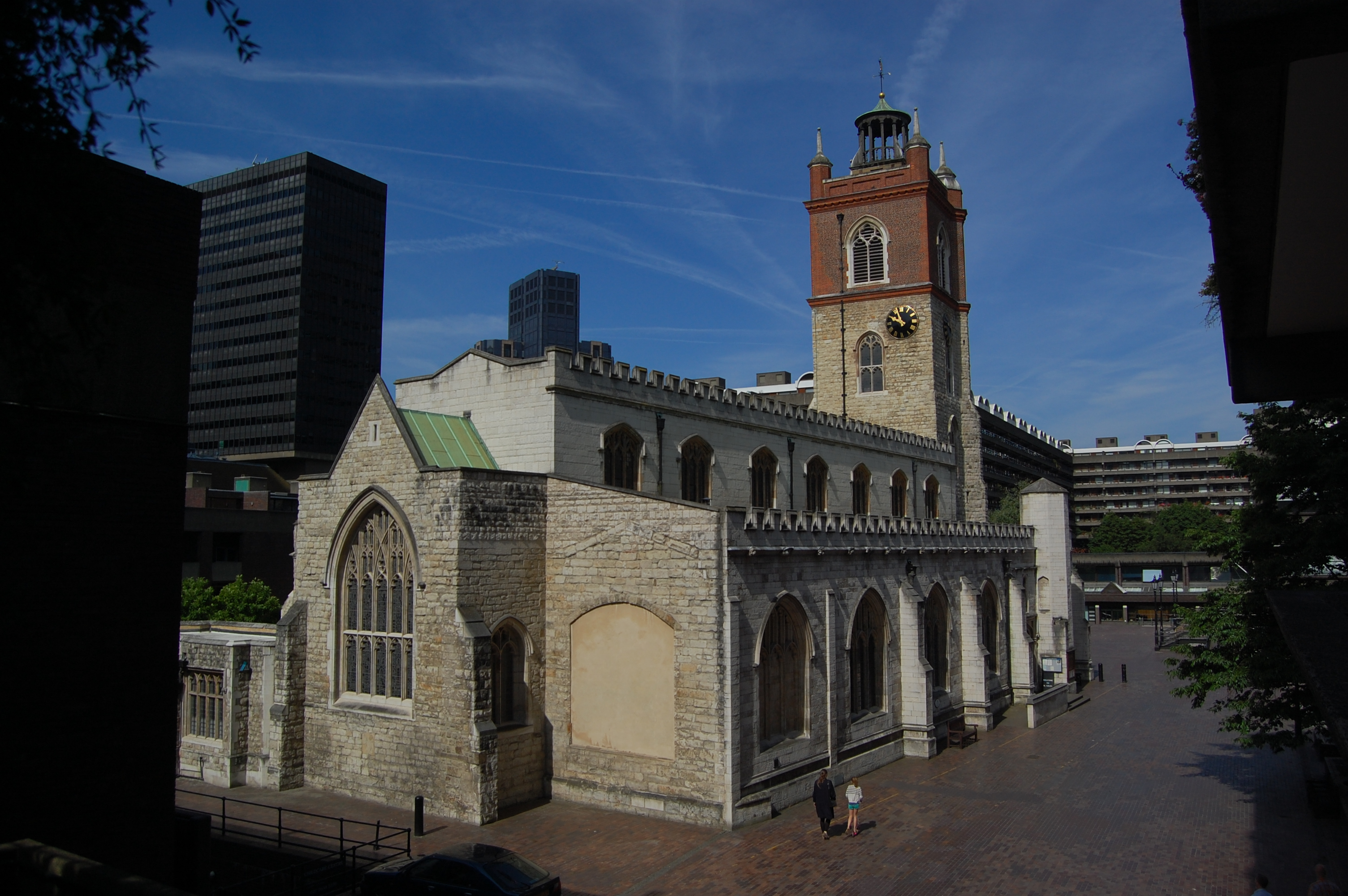
View from the outside

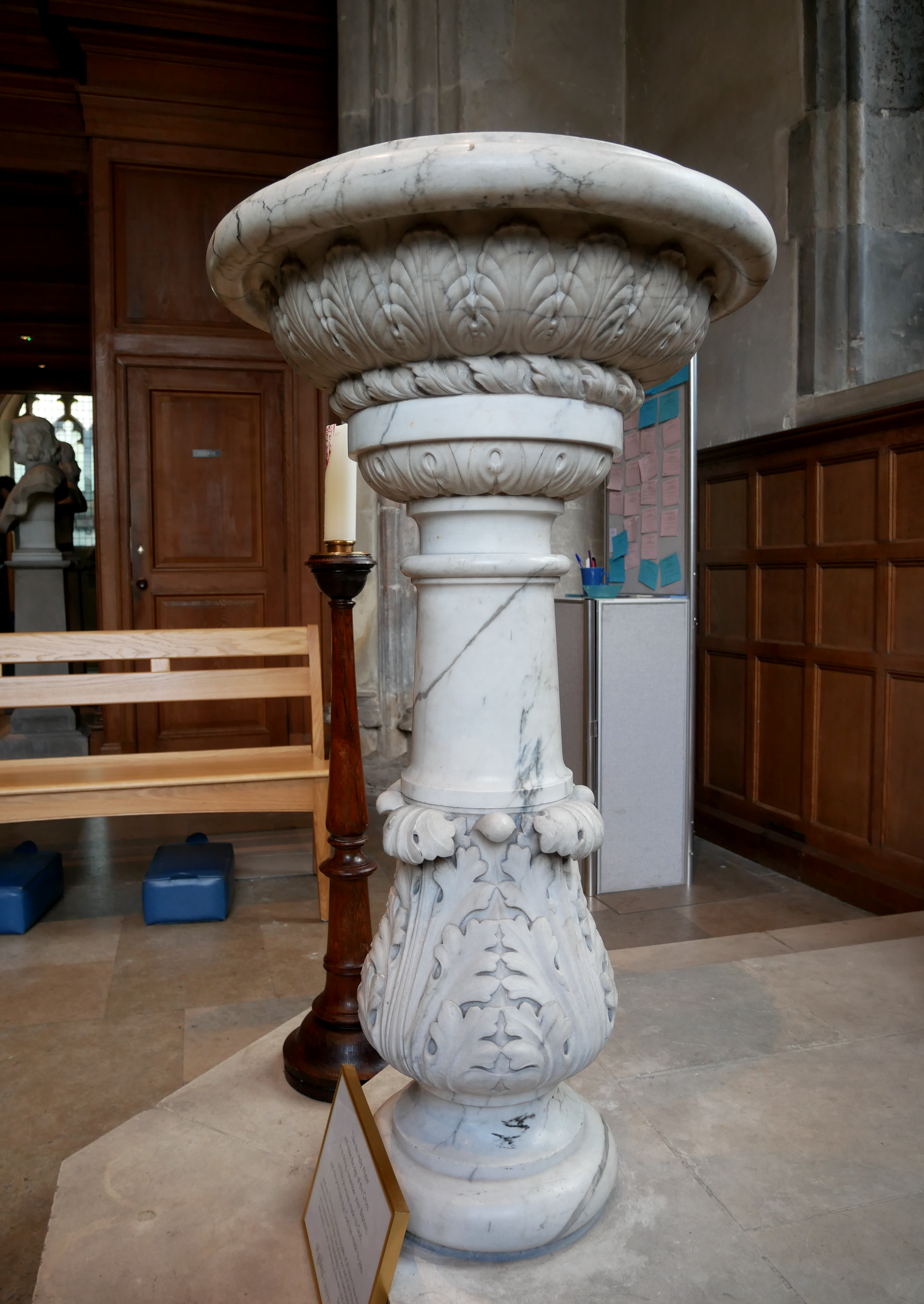
Baptismal Font in the church

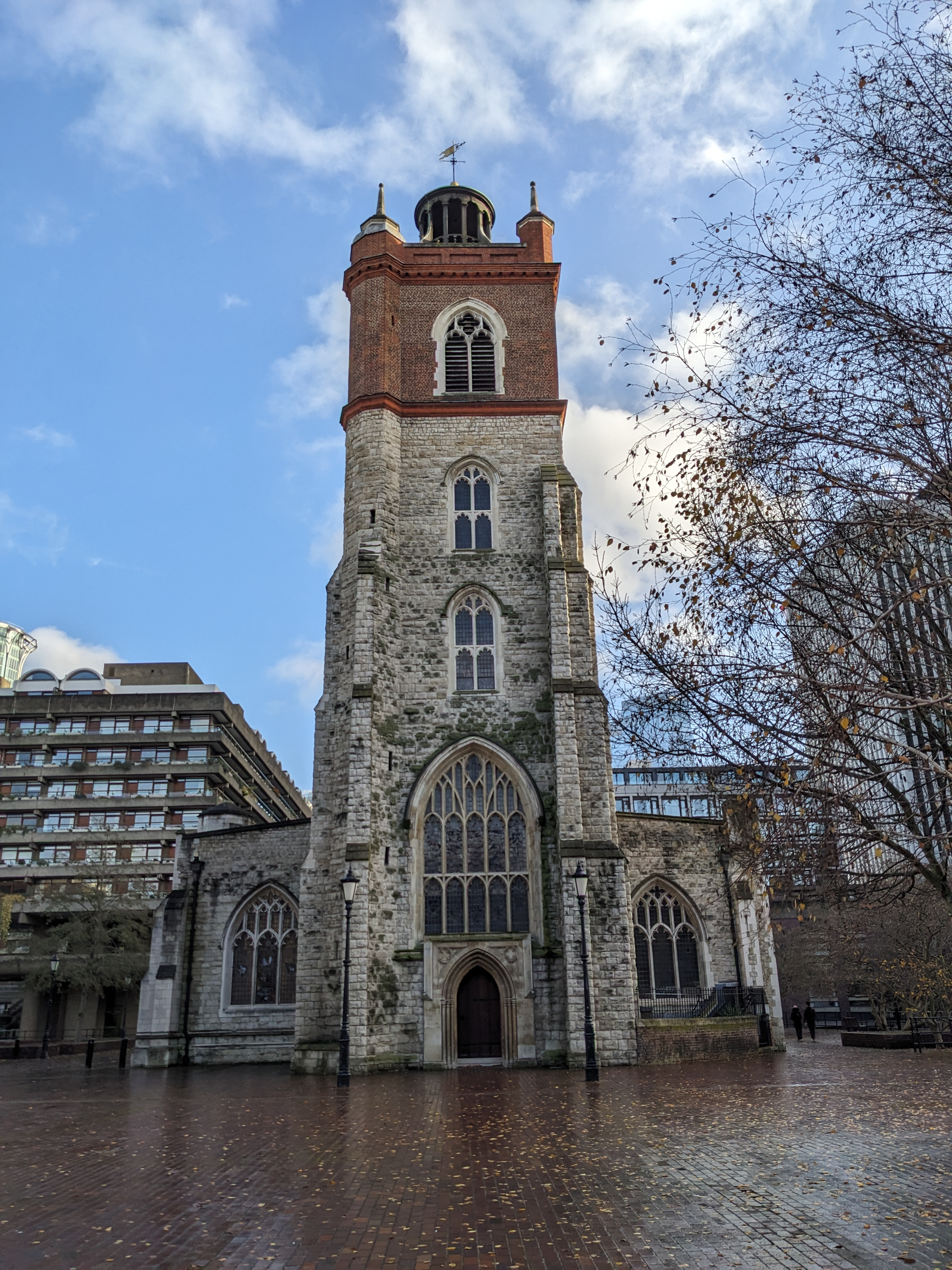
Tower of the church

== See also ==
- List of buildings that survived the Great Fire of London
- List of churches and cathedrals of London
