= Beech Street (London) =

Street in the City of London, England

Coordinates: 51°31′14.21″N 0°5′40.35″W

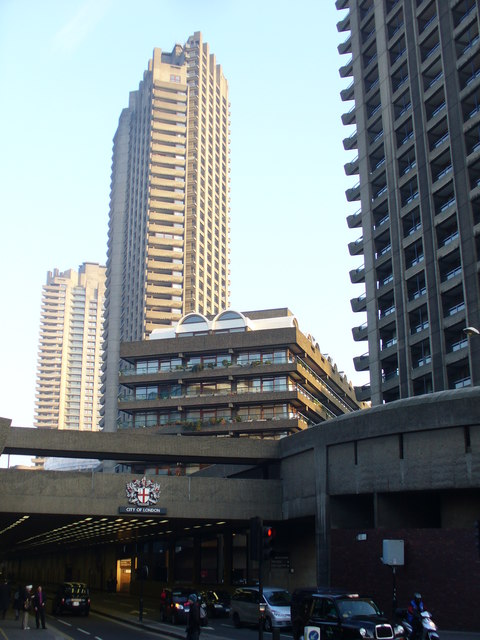
Beech Street

Beech Street is a street in the City of London, England. It was formerly known as Beech Lane and was named after Nicholas de la Beche, a lieutenant of the Tower of London in the reign of Edward III in the 14th century.

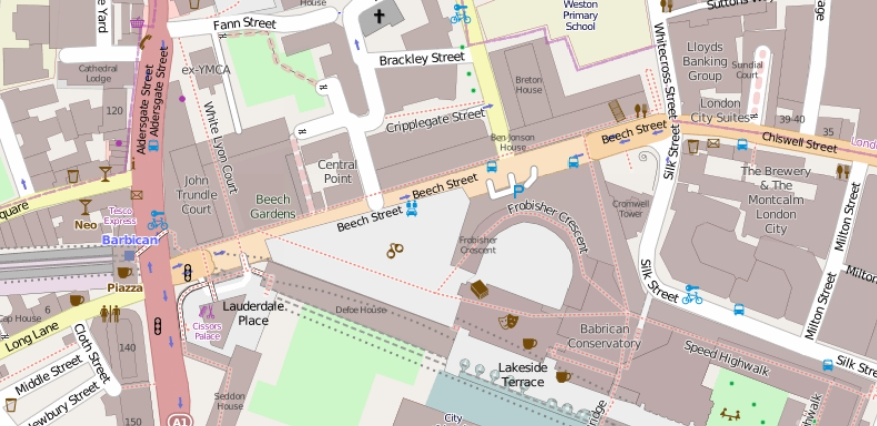
The immediate vicinity of Beech Street

It runs west–east, from its junction with Aldersgate Street and Long Lane in the west, to the junction with Whitecross Street, Silk Street and Chiswell Street in the east. The eastern junction marks the boundary of the city with Islington: Whitecross and Chiswell (north and east) are in Islington, while Beech and Silk (west and south) are in the city.

The majority of the street is in a pseudo-tunnel under the Barbican estate.

On 18 March 2020 the street became the UK's first "zero emission street", only allowing access to pedestrians, cyclists, and zero emission vehicles. This remained in effect until September 2021, and in December that year members of the City of London corporation voted for a public consultation into making the scheme permanent.

Access to several of the Barbican car parks is from Beech Street.
