= Long Lane, City of London =

Street in City of London, Greater London, United Kingdom

Coordinates: 51.5194°N 0.0996°W

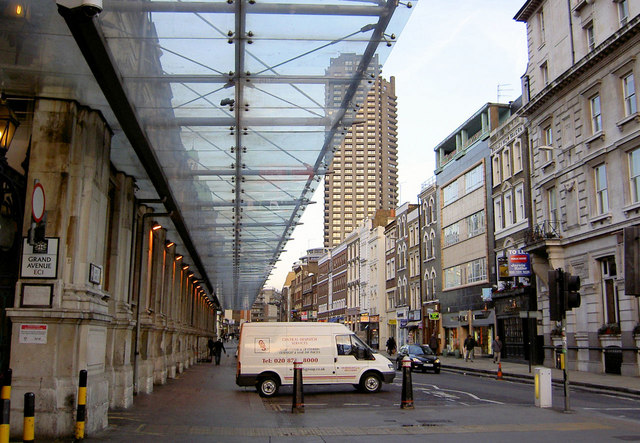
Long Lane passing Smithfield Market

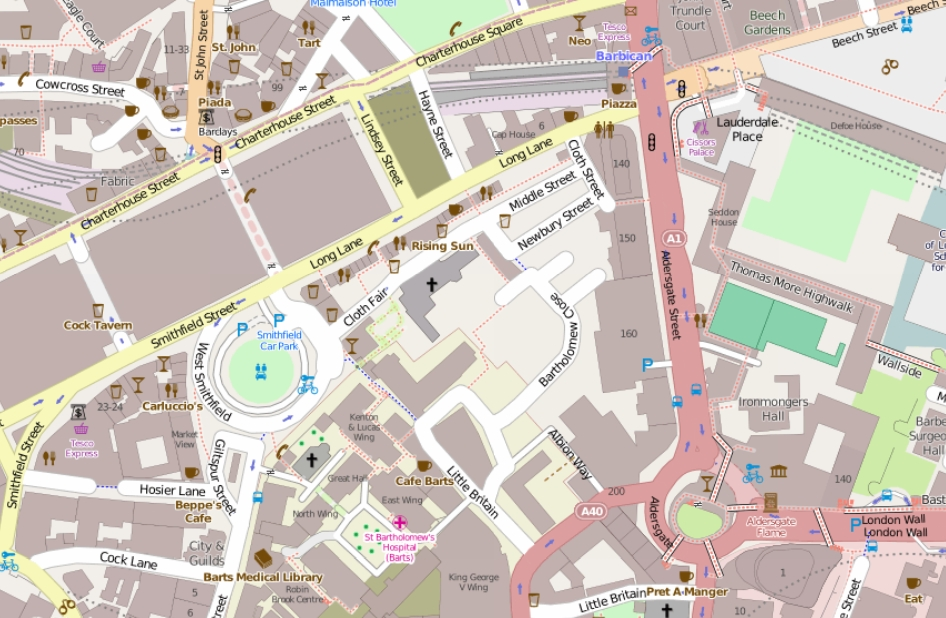
The immediate vicinity of Long Lane

Long Lane is a street in the City of London, the historic and primary financial centre of London.

It runs east–west and forms part of the B100 route. At the western end it becomes West Smithfield and in the east it becomes Beech Street, at the junction with Aldersgate Street.

The street is particularly known for drinking and dining, with a pub, The Old Red Cow, at Nos. 71–72, and restaurants Chabrot at Nos. 62-63 and Apulia (formerly Morgan M) at No. 50.

== See also ==
- Long Lane, Southwark, also in London.
