= Brick Lane =

Street in East London, England

Coordinates: 51°31′19″N 0°4′18″W

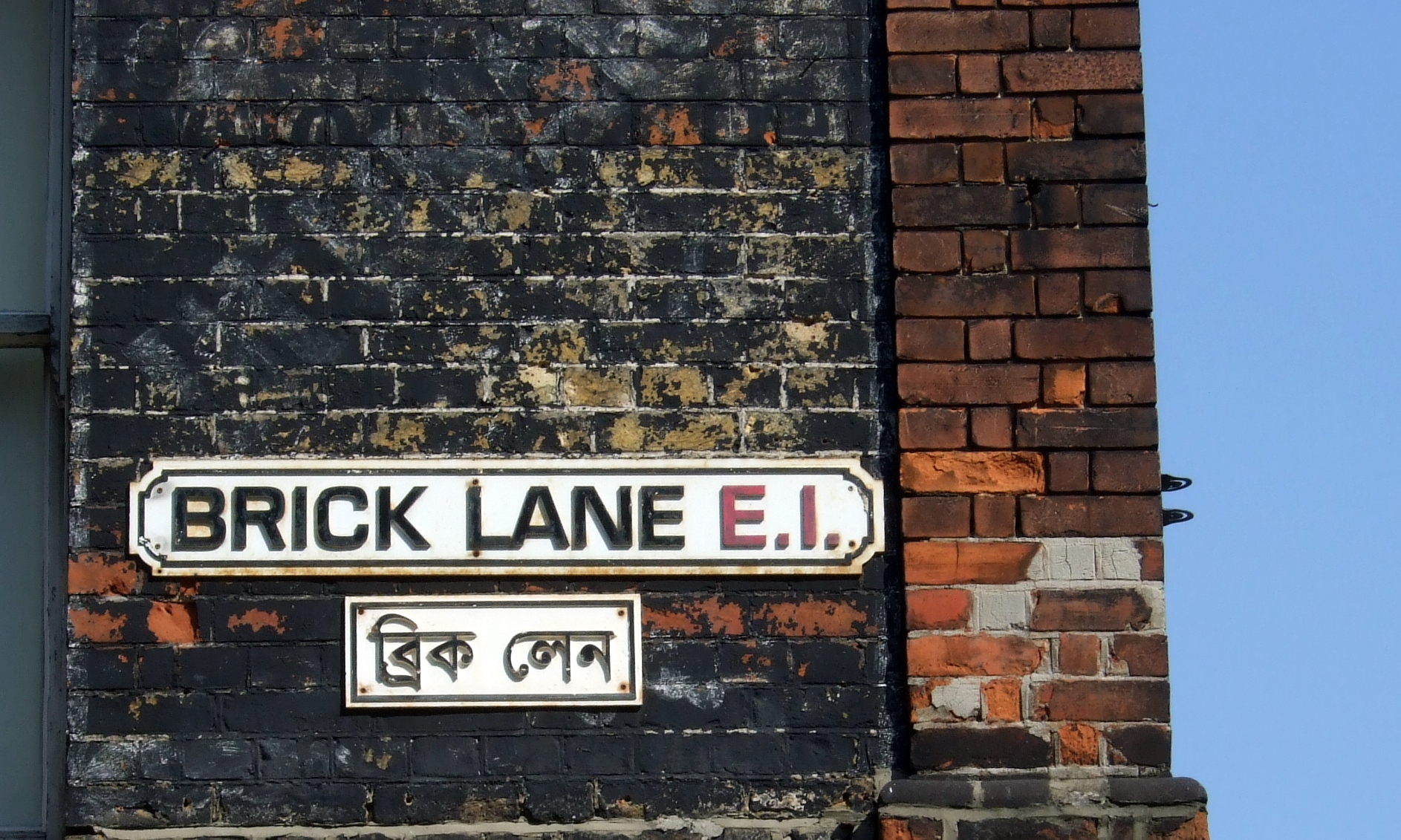
Brick Lane street sign in English and Bengali. The Bengali name is a transliteration, not a translation, of the English name.

Brick Lane (Bengali: ব্রিক লেন, romanized: Brik Len) is a street in the East End of London, in the borough of Tower Hamlets. It runs from Swanfield Street in Bethnal Green in the north, crosses the Bethnal Green Road before reaching the busiest, most commercially active part which runs through Spitalfields, or along its eastern edge. Brick Lane's southern end is connected to Whitechapel High Street by a short extension called Osborn Street.

Today, it is the heart of the country's Bangladeshi community with the vicinity known to some as Banglatown. It is notable for its Bangladeshi cuisine curry restaurants. The area surrounding Brick Lane and Spitalfields was branded as Banglatown in 1997, and the electoral ward of Spitalfields was changed to Spitalfields and Banglatown in 2002.

== History ==
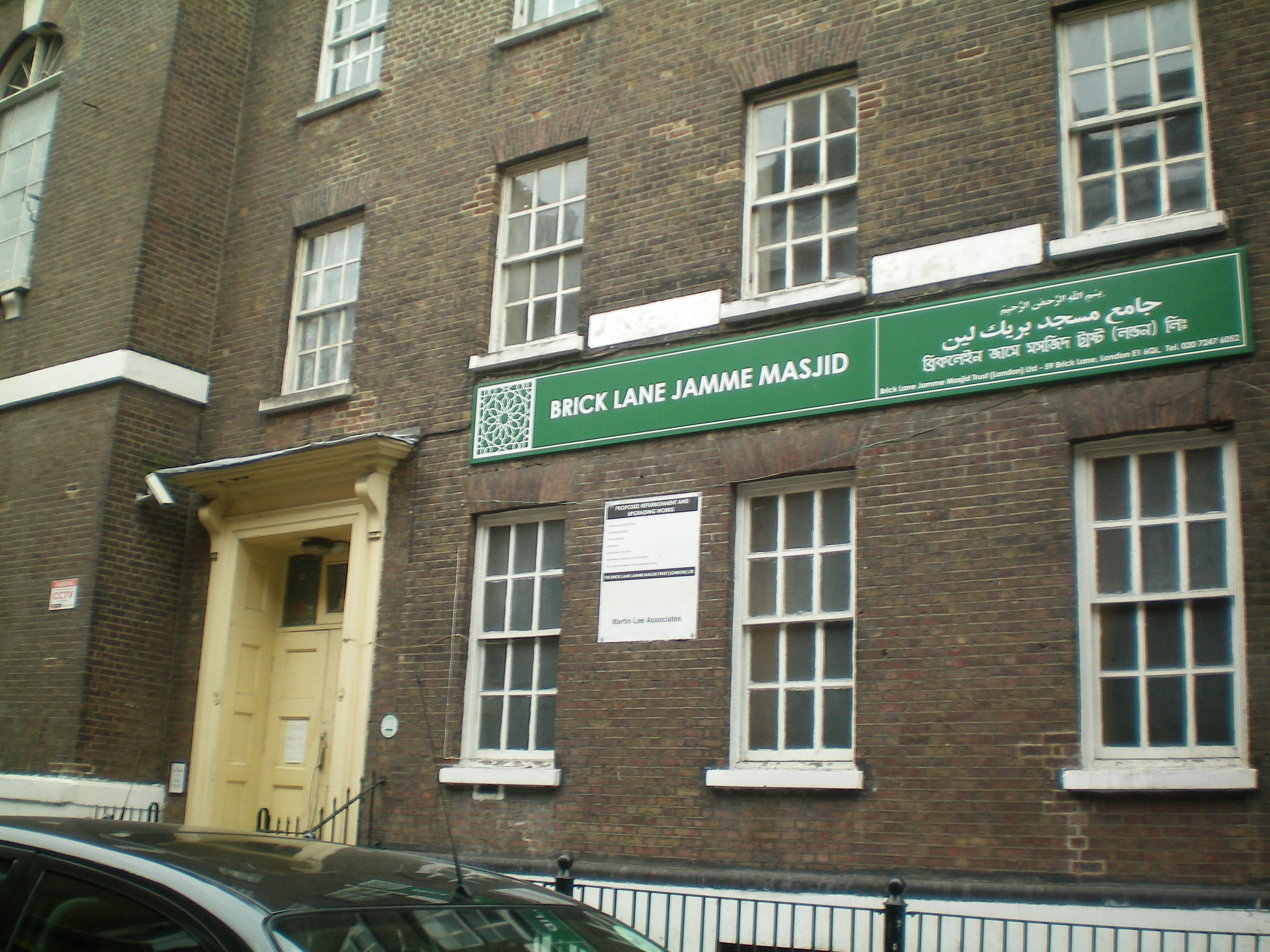
The Brick Lane Mosque, used first as a church and then a synagogue, reflecting changing demographics

=== 15th to 18th centuries ===
The street was formerly known as Whitechapel Lane, and wound through fields. It derives its current name from brick and tile manufacture started in the 15th century, which used the local brick earth deposits. The street featured in the 16th-century Woodcut map of London as a partially developed crossroad leading north from the city's most easterly edge, and by the 17th century was being developed northwards from the Barres (now Whitechapel High Street) as a result of expanding population.

Brewing came to Brick Lane before 1680, with water drawn from deep wells. One brewer was Joseph Truman, first recorded in 1683. His family, particularly Benjamin Truman, went on to establish the sizeable Black Eagle Brewery on Brick Lane. The Brick Lane Market first developed in the 17th century for fruit and vegetables sold outside the City.

Successive waves of immigrants settled in the area. In the 17th century, French Huguenots expanded into the area for housing; the master weavers were based in Spitalfields. Starting with the Huguenots, the area became a centre for weaving, tailoring and the developing clothing industry. It continued to attract immigrants, who provided semi-skilled and unskilled labour.

=== 19th-century markets and their modern use ===
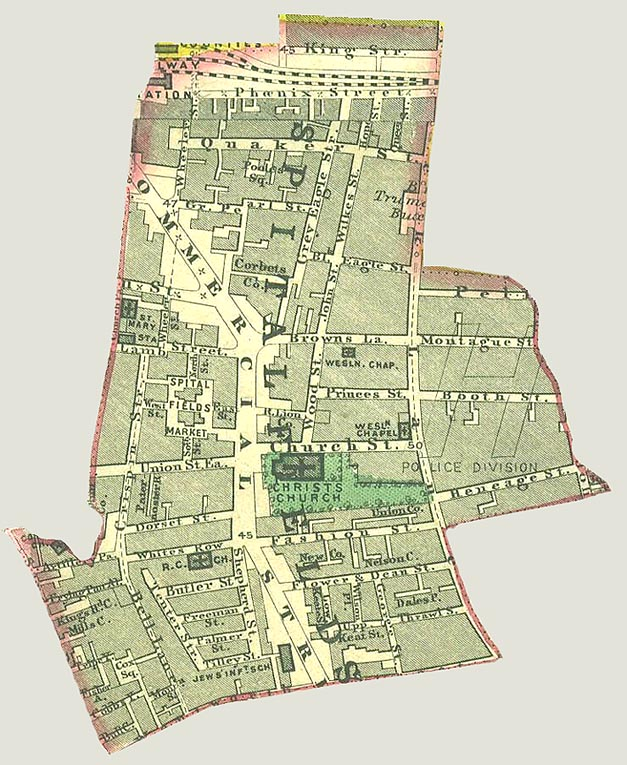
The heart of Brick Lane shown running N-S through, or along the eastern edge of the Parish of Spitalfields, c. 1885. Bethnal Green lies north and north-east, with Whitechapel south and south-east.

In the 19th century, Irish people and Ashkenazi Jews immigrated to the area. Jewish immigration continued into the early 20th century.

The Sunday market, like those on Petticoat Lane and nearby Columbia Road, dates from a dispensation given by the government to the Jewish community in the 19th century. At the time, owing to the Christian observance of Sunday rest, no Sunday markets were open. Located at the junction of Cheshire Street and Sclater Street, the market sells bric-a-brac as well as fruit, vegetables and many other items.

In 2015 it was identified by police as the focal point of a trade in stolen bicycles and bicycle parts, many taken from people employed in the City of London who had used "cycle to work" schemes. Alongside seven arrests, the police also warned purchasers that buying bicycles or parts in deals "too good to be true" could make them guilty of handling stolen goods. Near the junction with Hanbury Street are two indoor markets; Upmarket and Backyard Market. The Brick Lane Farmers' Market opened in 2010, intended to be held every Sunday in nearby Bacon Street; it has now closed.

In the later 20th century, Bengali Muslims (specifically the Sylhetis) comprised the major group of immigrants and gradually dominated the demography in the area. Many Bengali immigrants to Brick Lane were from the north-eastern region of Sylhet, of which became part of Bangladesh. These settlers helped shape Bangladeshi migration to Britain; many families from Beanibazar, Jagannathpur and Bishwanath tend to live in the Brick Lane area though they spread around the London city.

=== Religious groups ===
In 1742, La Neuve Eglise, a Huguenot chapel, was built on the corner of Brick Lane and Fournier Street. By 1809, it was used by Wesleyan missionaries as The Jews' Chapel, where they promoted Christianity to the expanding Jewish population. It was adapted as a Methodist chapel in 1819 for Protestant residents. (John Wesley had preached his first "covenant sermon" at the nearby Black Eagle Street Chapel).

Reflecting the changing demographics of the area, in 1898, the building was consecrated as the Machzike HaDath, or Spitalfields Great Synagogue. After decades of change in the area, with Jews moving out and Bangladeshis moving in, in 1976 it was adapted again as the London Jamme Masjid (Great London Mosque) to serve the expanding Bangladeshi community. The building is Grade II* listed.

=== Bengali settlement ===
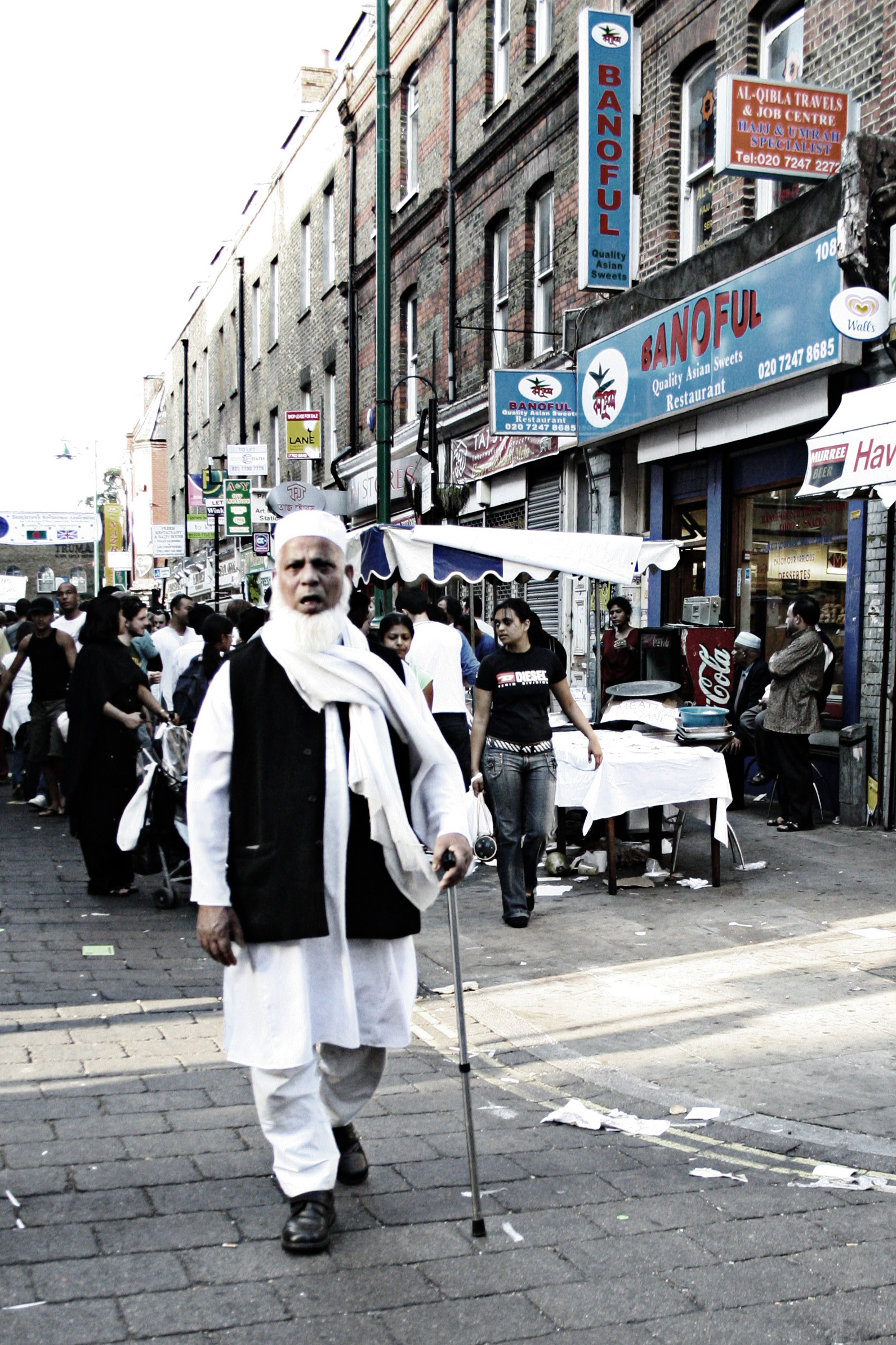
An elderly Bangladeshi man in Brick Lane

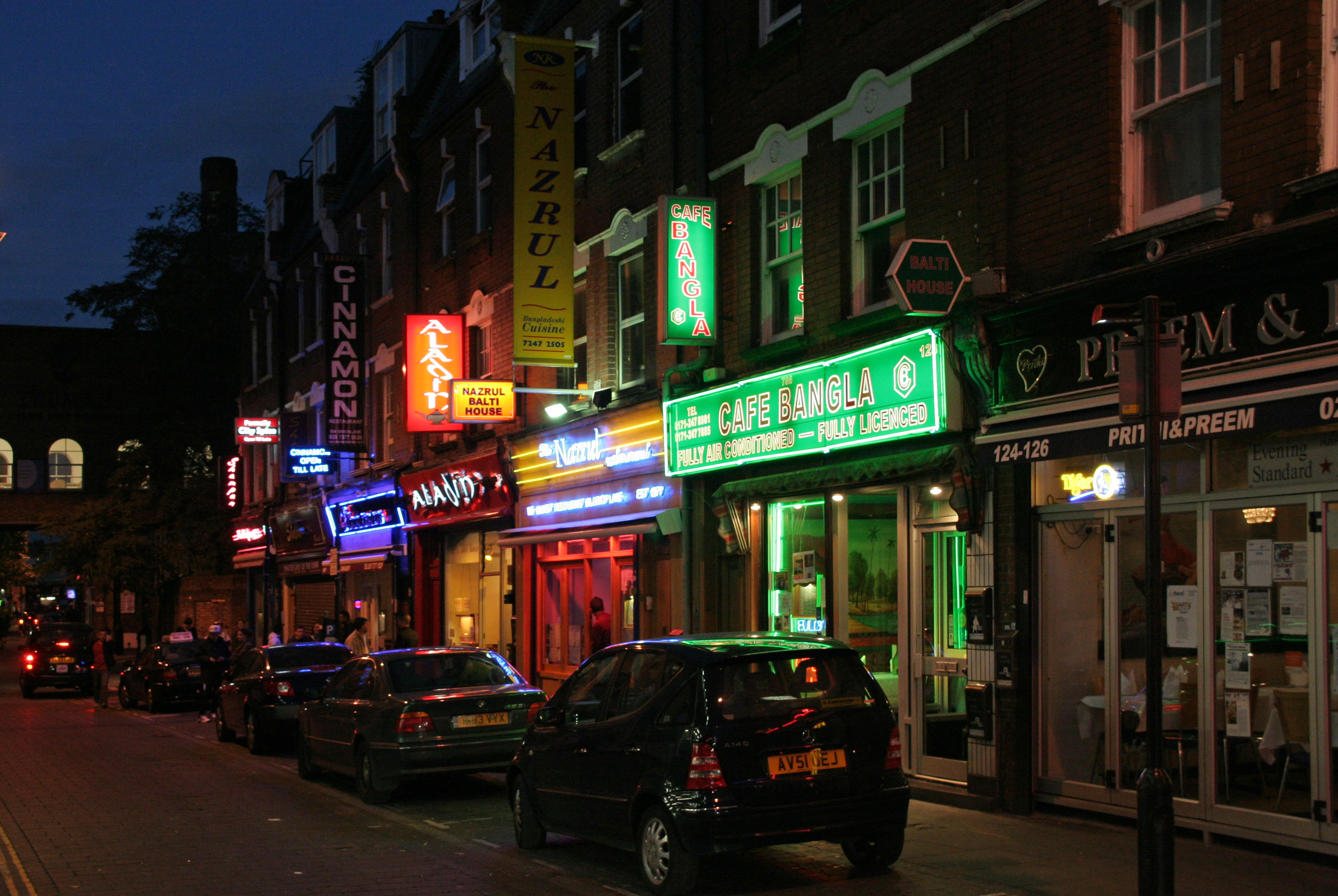
Curry restaurants in Brick Lane, 2008

In the 20th century the Brick Lane area was important in the development of British Bangladeshi cuisine, as families, especially from the Greater Sylhet region, migrated to London to look for work. Some curry houses in the area do not sell alcoholic beverages, as most are owned by Muslims. According to EasyJet Traveller magazine, the top three curry houses on Brick Lane in 2021 were Aladin, Sheba and City Spice.

Bengalis in the United Kingdom settled in big cities with industrial employment. In London, many settled in the East End. For centuries the East End has been the first port of call for many immigrants working in the docks and shipping from Chittagong port in Bengal (the British Empire in India was founded and based in Bengal). Their regular stopover paved the way for food outlets to be opened; these catered at first for an all-male workforce, for family migration and settlement took place some decades later. Humble beginnings such as this gave rise to Brick Lane as the famous curry capital of the UK.

An ornamental Brick Lane Arch designed by Meena Thakor was erected in 1997 near Osborn Street to mark the entrance to Brick Lane and to 'Banglatown'. Like Brick Lane's lamp posts, the arch displays the red and green colours of the Bangladesh flag. The Bengali community campaigned to get the arch installed to celebrate Bengali culture in Brick Lane. A curry festival on the street was for a while run annually, but the restaurants and Bangladeshi shops declined sharply during the COVID-19 pandemic.

=== Regeneration ===
More recently the area has also broadened to being an art and fashion student area, with exhibition space. Each year most of the fine art and fashion courses exhibit their work near Brick Lane.

Since the late 1990s, Brick Lane has been the site of several of the city's night clubs, notably 93 Feet East and The Vibe Bar, both built on the site of The Old Truman Brewery, once the industrial centre of the area, and now an office and entertainment complex. In 1999, it was the scene of a bombing that injured 13 people.

Brick Lane has a regular display of graffiti, which features artists such as Banksy, Stik, ROA, D*Face, Ben Eine and Omar Hassan. The street has been used in music videos, including "Glory Days" by Just Jack, "All These Things That I've Done" by The Killers, and "Überlin" by R.E.M. In 2023, some Chinese students painted the political slogan of the Chinese Communist Party, "Core Socialist Values", in Chinese, sparking significant controversy.

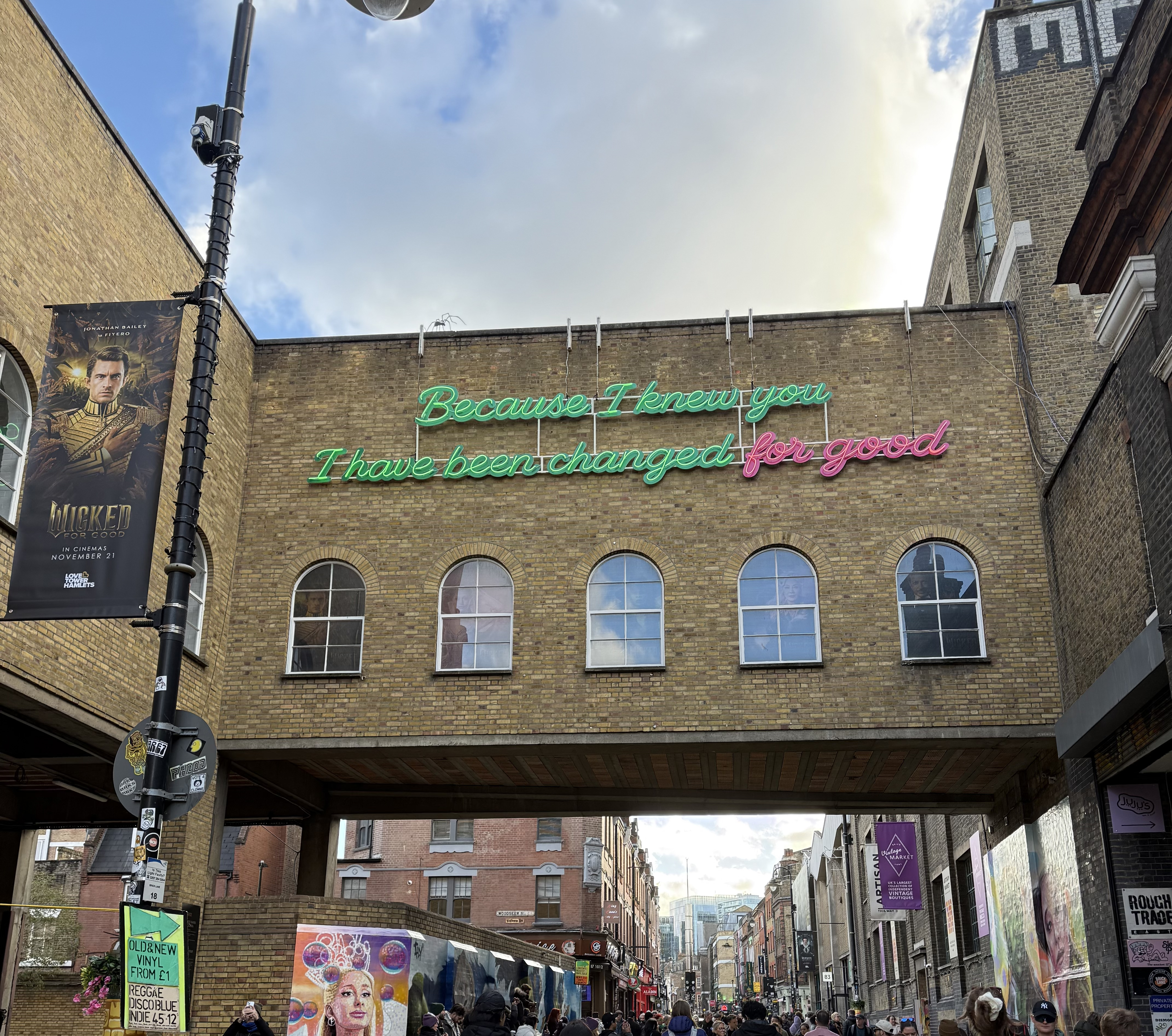
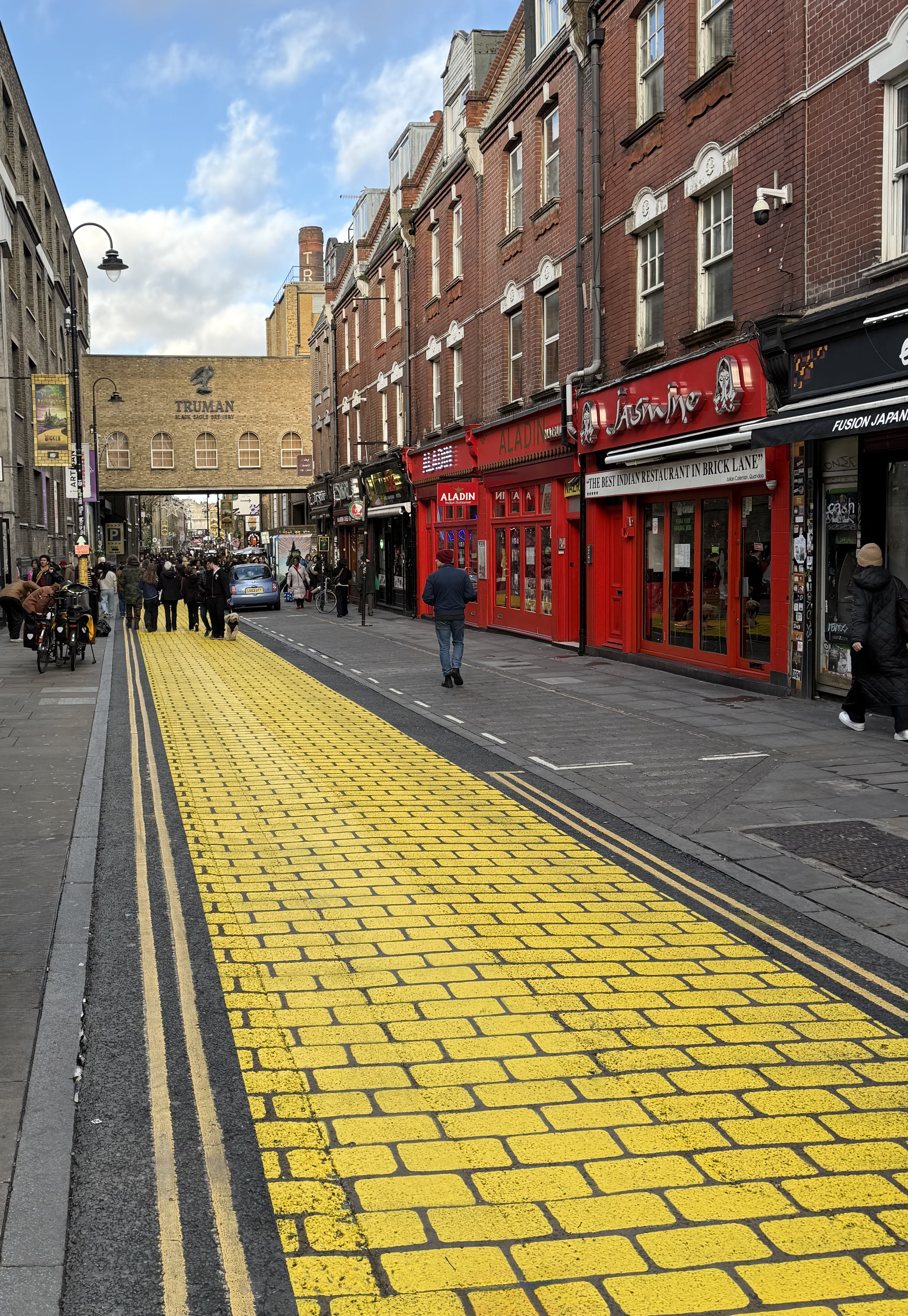
Brick Lane painted as "Yellow Brick Lane", a temporary installation promoting the film Wicked: For Good, in 2025

In November 2025, Brick Lane was temporarily renamed "Yellow Brick Lane" as a promotional installation for the film Wicked: For Good, released in UK cinemas on 21 November 2025. It was organised through a collaboration between Universal UK, the Truman Brewery and Tower Hamlets Council. A section of roadway was painted to resemble a yellow brick path, and six artists were commissioned to create themed murals and installations along the route, which also included temporary street-name changes and other decorations. The installation remained in place until 2 December 2025.

== Land ownership and naming ==
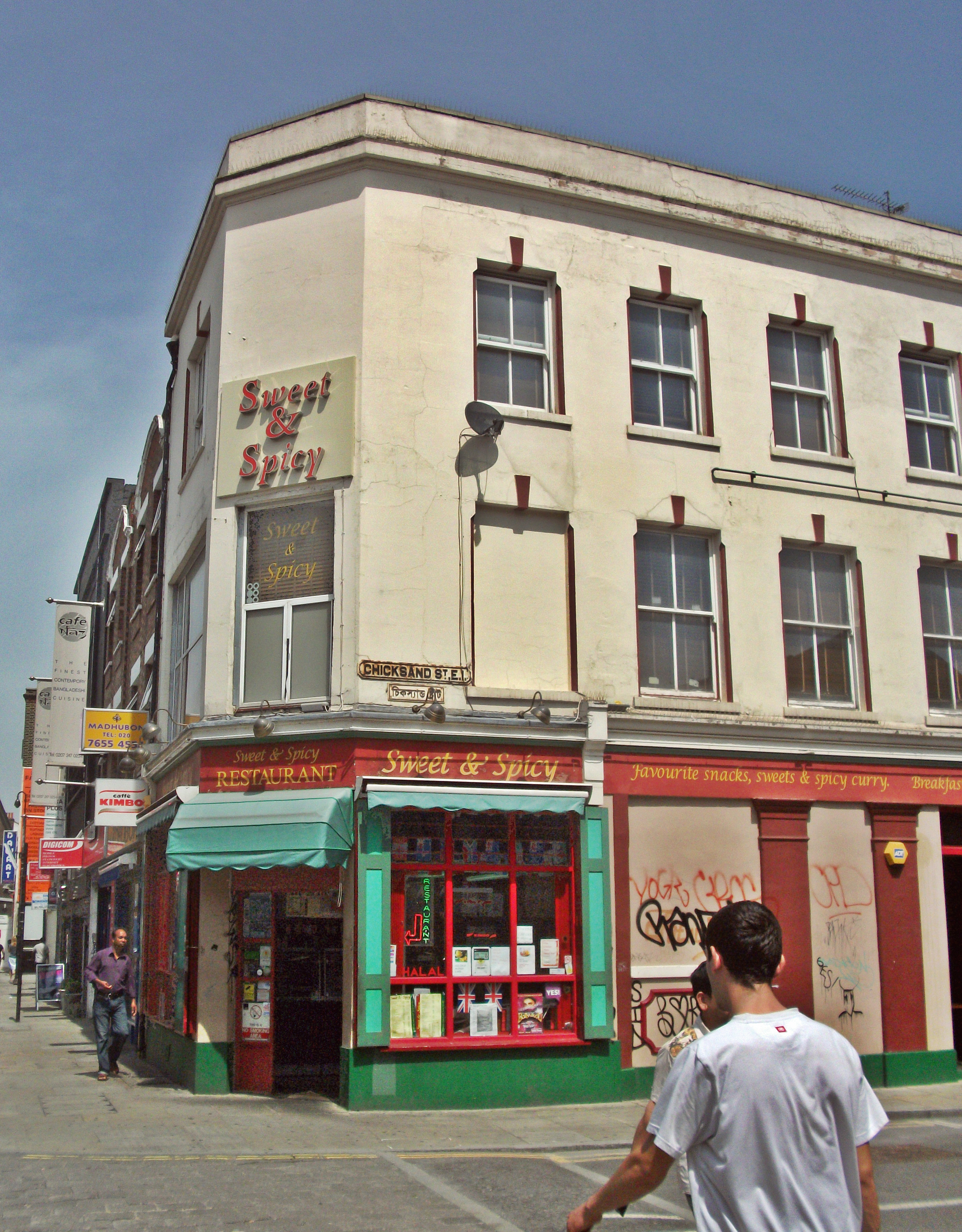
The corner of Chicksand Street and Brick Lane in 2011

Large swathes of Brick Lane and its surrounding areas were once owned by the Osborne (later Osborn after 1720) family, Baronets, of Chicksands in the County of Bedford. The family's holdings survived until at least the 1970s. The family's history continues to be reflected by the naming of streets in the area around Brick Lane, including:

- Chicksand Street reflects the village of Chicksands in Bedfordshire, location of the family seat Chicksands Priory;
- The west end of what is now Chicksand Street was once Osborn Place (see 1787 map);
- Modern Osborn Street is a renaming of what was once the southernmost stretch of Brick Lane (see Rocque map of 1746 for this naming, altered by the time of the 1787 map);
- Heneage Street reflects the marriage of George Osborn, 4th Baronet, to Lady Heneage Finch (his 2nd wife) in April 1772;
- The modern Hopetown Street was originally Finch Street, reflecting the same marriage (see 1853 map, right);
- The modern Old Montague Street was originally just Montague Street, preserving the maternal family name of George Osborn, 4th Baronet, whose mother, Mary Montague, was the daughter of George Montague, 2nd Earl of Halifax. The continuation of Chicksand Street to the east (now demolished) was once Halifax Street, referencing the same marriage;
- Modern Hanbury Street is made up of four streets shown on the 1853 map: Browns Lane, Montague Street (triggering the addition of 'Old' to the earlier street of the same name), Well Street and Church Street.
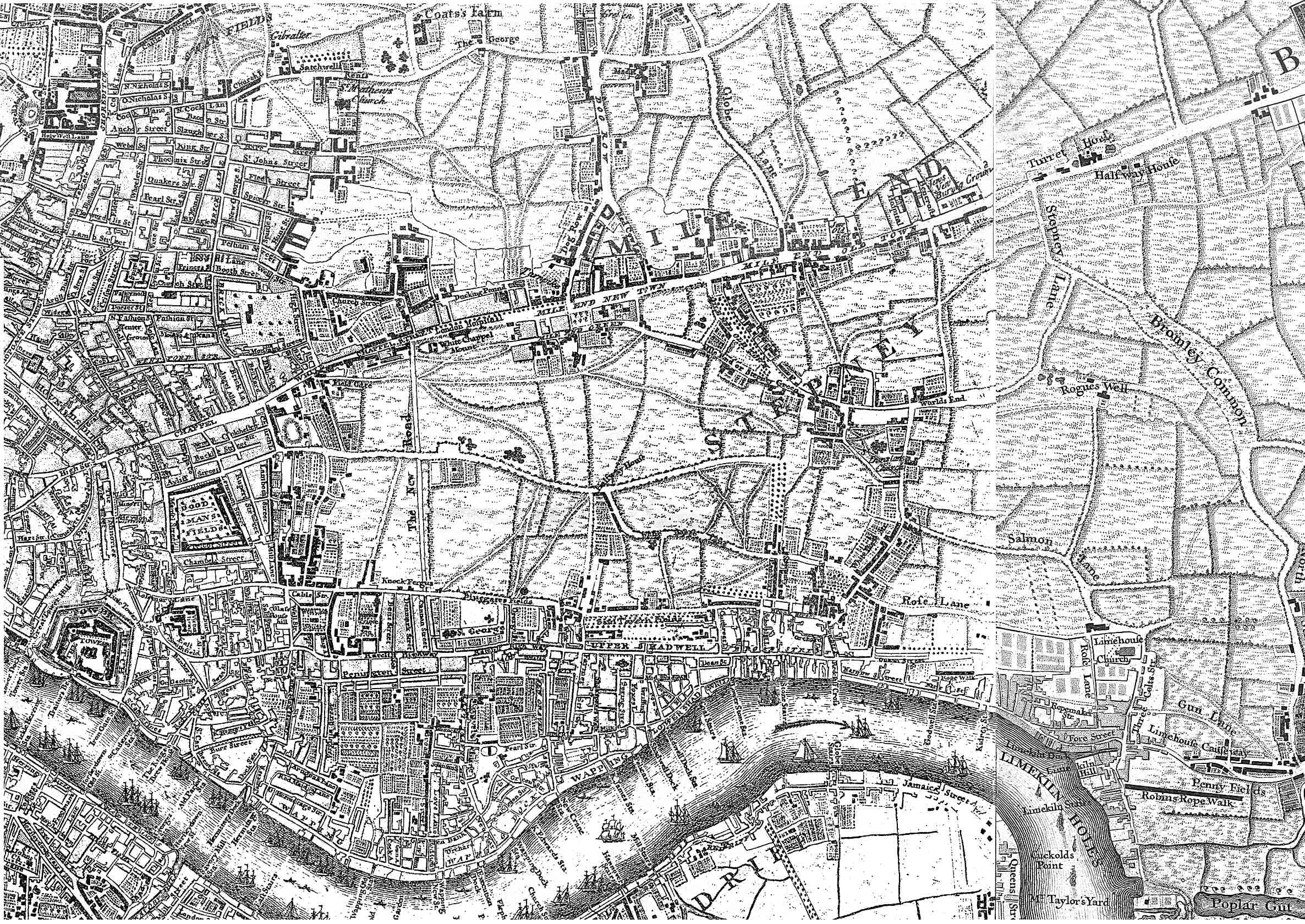
John Rocque's Map of London, 1746

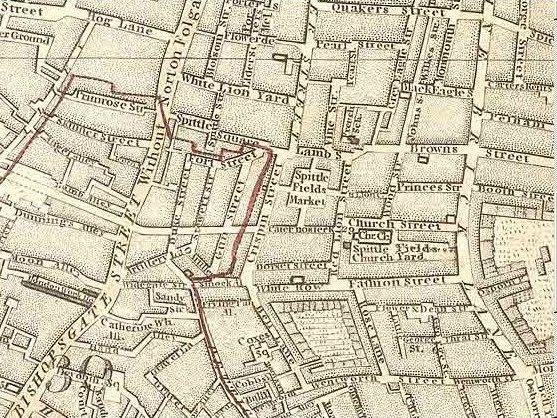
Map, publisher unknown, dated 1787, showing Spitalfields ("Spittlefields") and its environs

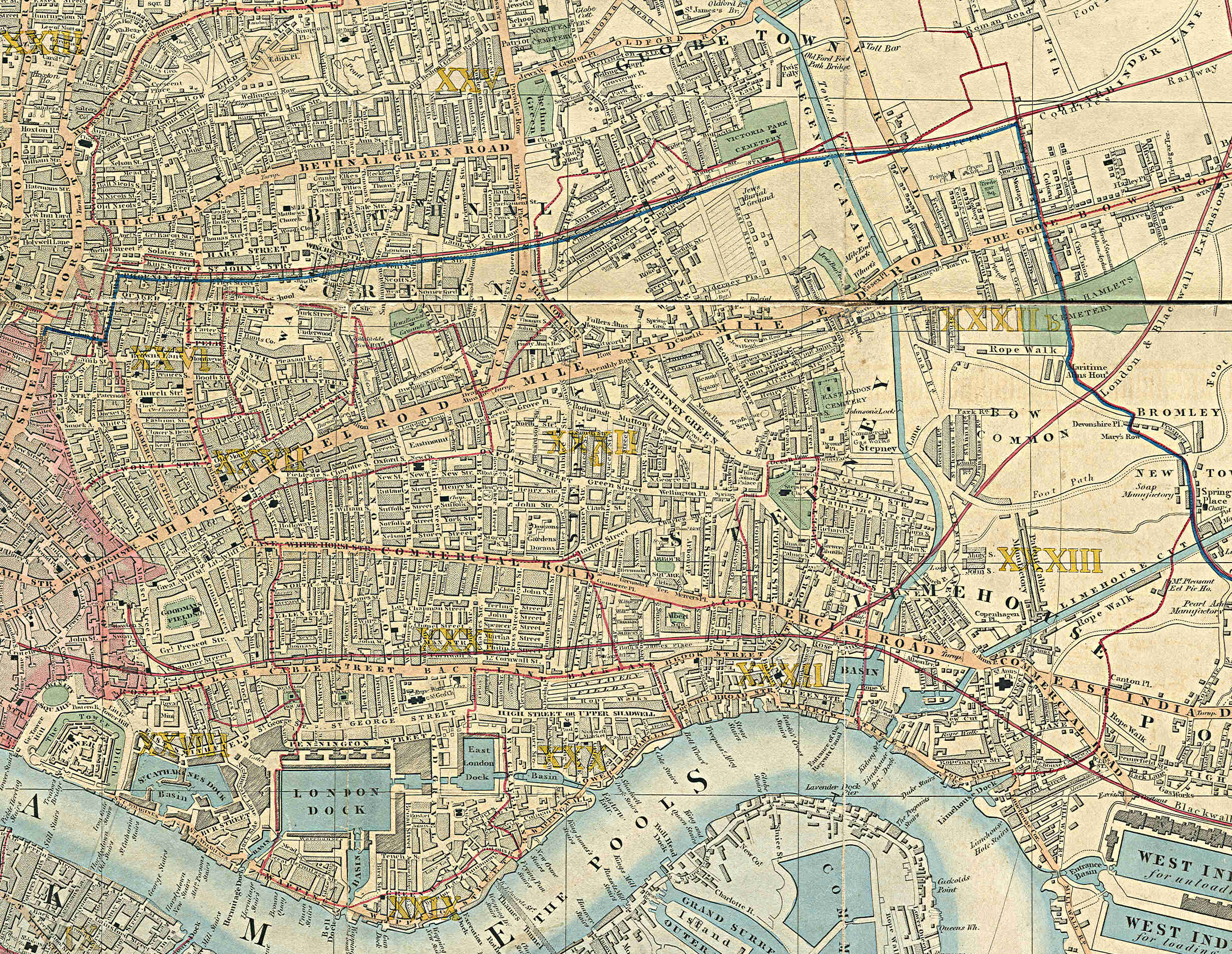
An extract from Cross's New Plan Of London, showing Stepney and surrounding areas. Published 1853 by J. Cross of London.

== Buildings of interest ==
Nearby buildings of interest include Christ Church, Spitalfields, the Jamme Masjid or Great London Mosque on the corner of Fournier Street (the building represents a history of successive communities of immigrants in East End), the Truman Brewery, and The Rag Factory on Heneage Street (once home to Turner Prize nominees Tracey Emin and Gary Hume, now a thriving arts space).

== Transport ==
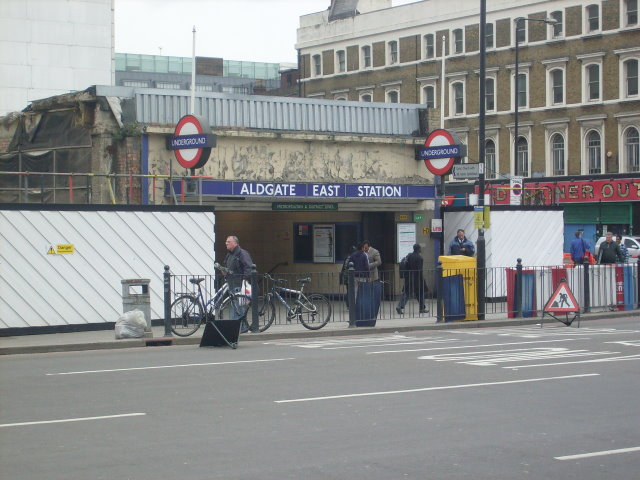
Aldgate East Tube station in 2008

The nearest London Underground stations are Aldgate East and Liverpool Street. A campaign was launched in 2006 to change the name of Aldgate East station to "Brick Lane", but received no official support.

The nearest London Overground station is Shoreditch High Street station. This line runs on part of the former East London Line which has now been converted to London Overground. At the junction with Pedley Street existed the former Shoreditch Underground station terminus, which closed in 2006 due to the construction of the East London Line extension, and replaced by the aforementioned Shoreditch High Street. Remnants of the station can be seen from overground trains entering and leaving Liverpool Street station.

== In popular culture ==
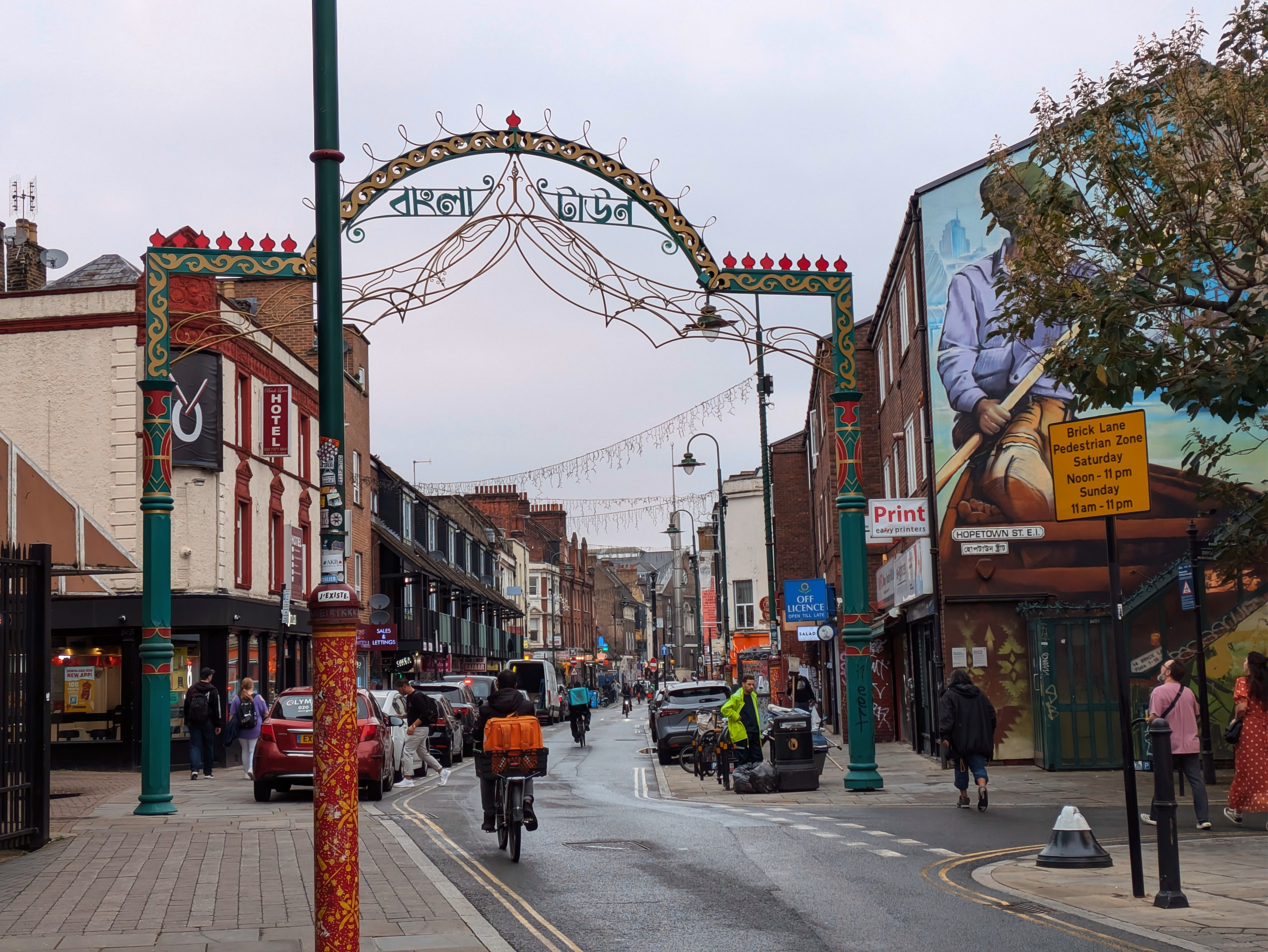
Brick Lane in 2024

The street is the location for Monica Ali's 2003 novel Brick Lane, and Sarah Gavron's debut 2007 film of the same name starring Tannishtha Chatterjee. Some of the local South Asian community felt that they were portrayed negatively, and opposed plans by Ruby Films to film parts of the movie based on the novel in the Brick Lane area and formed a "Campaign Against Monica Ali's Film Brick Lane". Consequently, the producers used different locations for scenes such as that depicting Brick Lane Market. The novel was shortlisted for the Man Booker Prize.

Other notable books on the area are Tarquin Hall's 2006 book Salaam Brick Lane, Rachel Lichtenstein's 2007 study On Brick Lane, and Jeremy Gavron's fictionalised 2006 history An Acre of Barren Ground. A large collection of photographs of the characters and salespeople who worked on the markets in Brick Lane were taken by Fran May between 1976 and 1978, whilst she was a student of photography at the Royal College of Art.

== See also ==
- Beigel Bake
- British Bangladeshi
- Drummond Street, London
- Green Street, London
- Balti Triangle, Birmingham
