= Brick Lane Market =

Markets in London centered on Brick Lane

Coordinates: 51.5235°N 0.0715°W

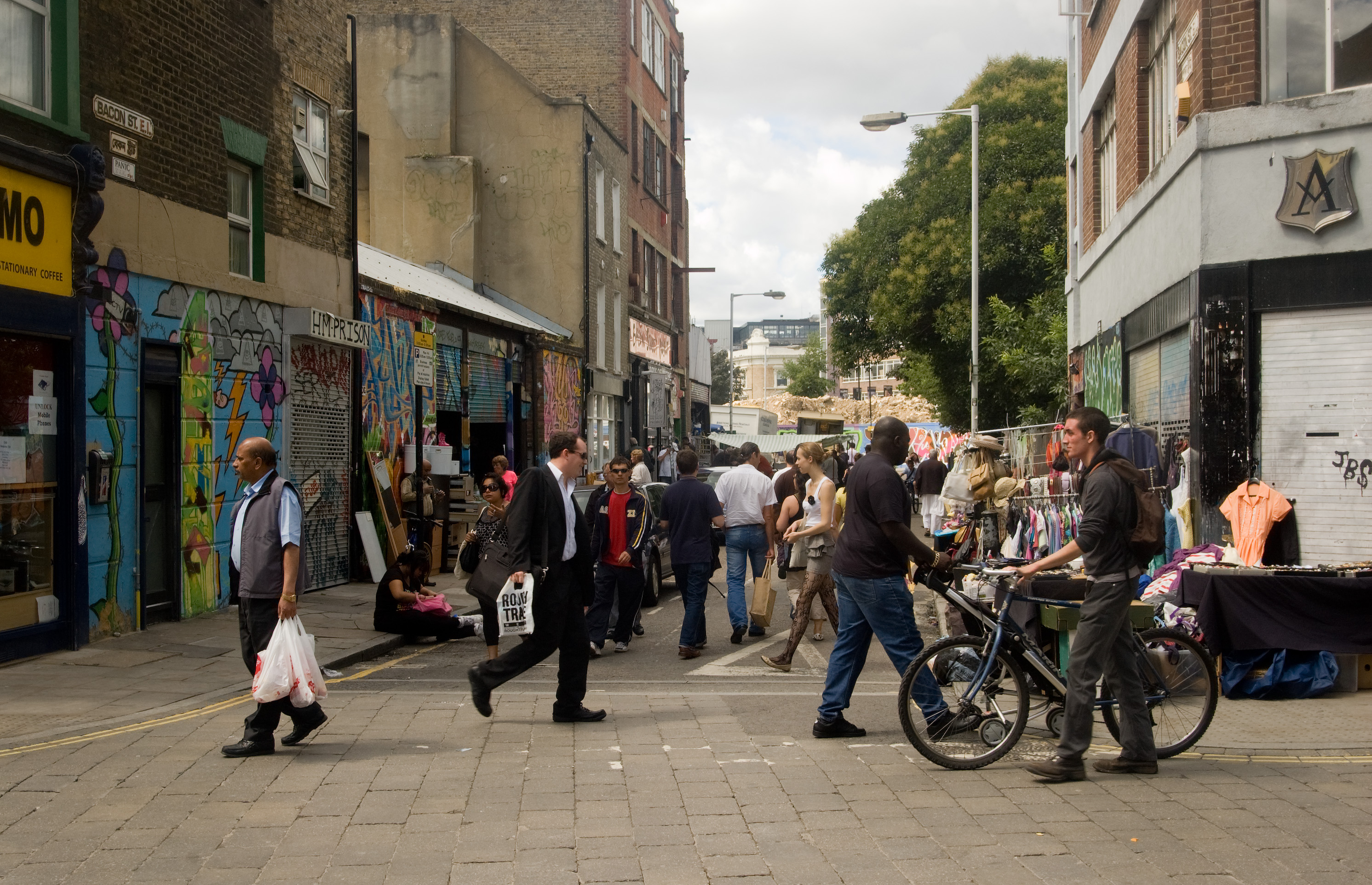
People in Brick Lane Market

Brick Lane Market is the collective name for a number of London markets centred on Brick Lane, in Tower Hamlets in east London. The original market was located at the northern end of Brick Lane and in the heart of what is now east London's Bangladeshi community but now commonly refers to the various markets that are housed along the famous London street. The various markets that stretch the length of Brick Lane operate both weekdays but most historically weekends: Saturday from 11 a.m. to 6 p.m. and Sunday from 10 a.m. to 6 p.m.

The markets sell a diverse range of items, from antique books to eight-track cartridge decks, vintage clothing to street food, and for many years hosted a stall selling nothing but rusty cog wheels. The markets have always been popular with and much photographed by art students, and bargain hunters from across London value it greatly.

== History ==
=== Early history ===
The markets originally developed in the 17th century as a lone farmers' market that was held on Sundays due to religious observances by the area's then-prolific Jewish community. During the 20th century, the Brick Lane area experienced an influx of Bangladeshi immigrants who transformed the marketplace. Even today, Brick Lane is very famous for its curry houses.

=== Recent history ===
Since the early 2000s, several specific markets have opened within the premises of the Old Truman Brewery. Once one of London's largest breweries, The Truman Brewery is now home to roughly 250 businesses, shops, and eateries.

== Truman Markets ==
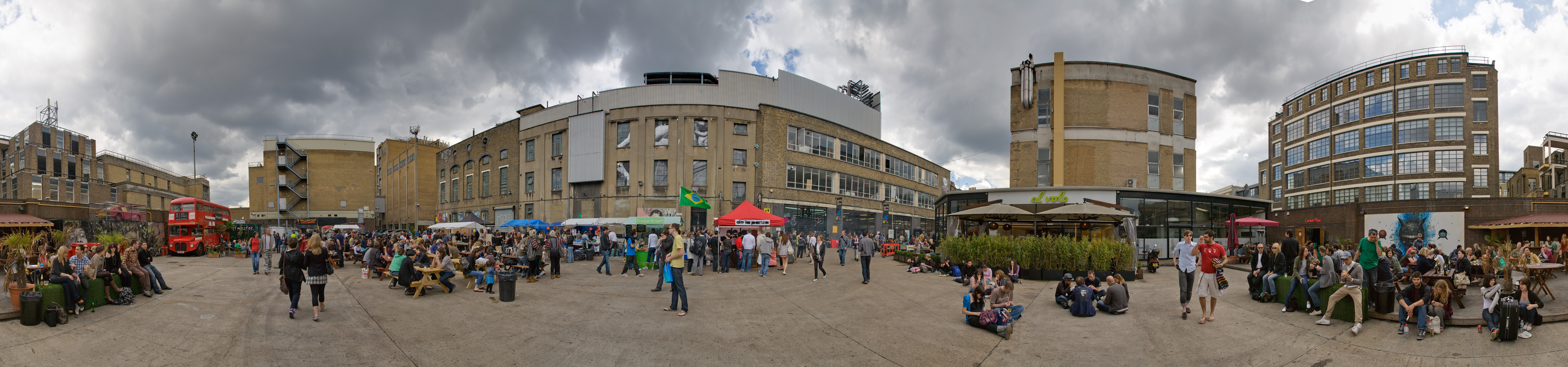
a 360 degree view of the rear courtyard of the Sunday UpMarket

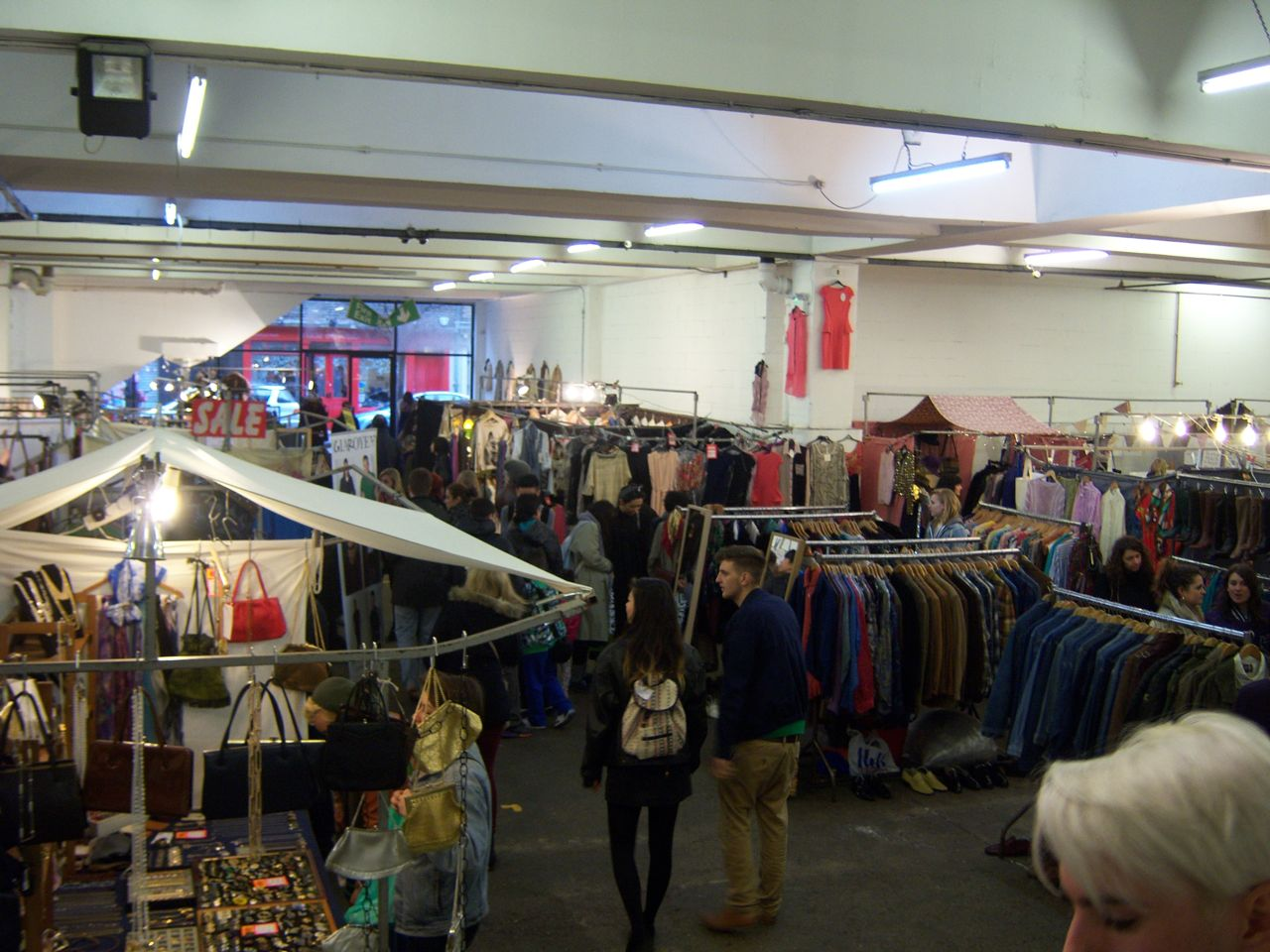
The Sunday UpMarket, one of the five markets comprising the Truman Markets

The Truman Markets forms a part of the wider Brick Lane Market and is located in the historic 11-acre Old Truman Brewery, at the northern end of Brick Lane.

The Truman Markets comprise six different markets, all opened at different times in the past two decade: Backyard Market, Brick Lane Vintage Market, Ely's Yard Food Trucks, Rinse Showrooms, Upmarket, and the Tea Rooms.

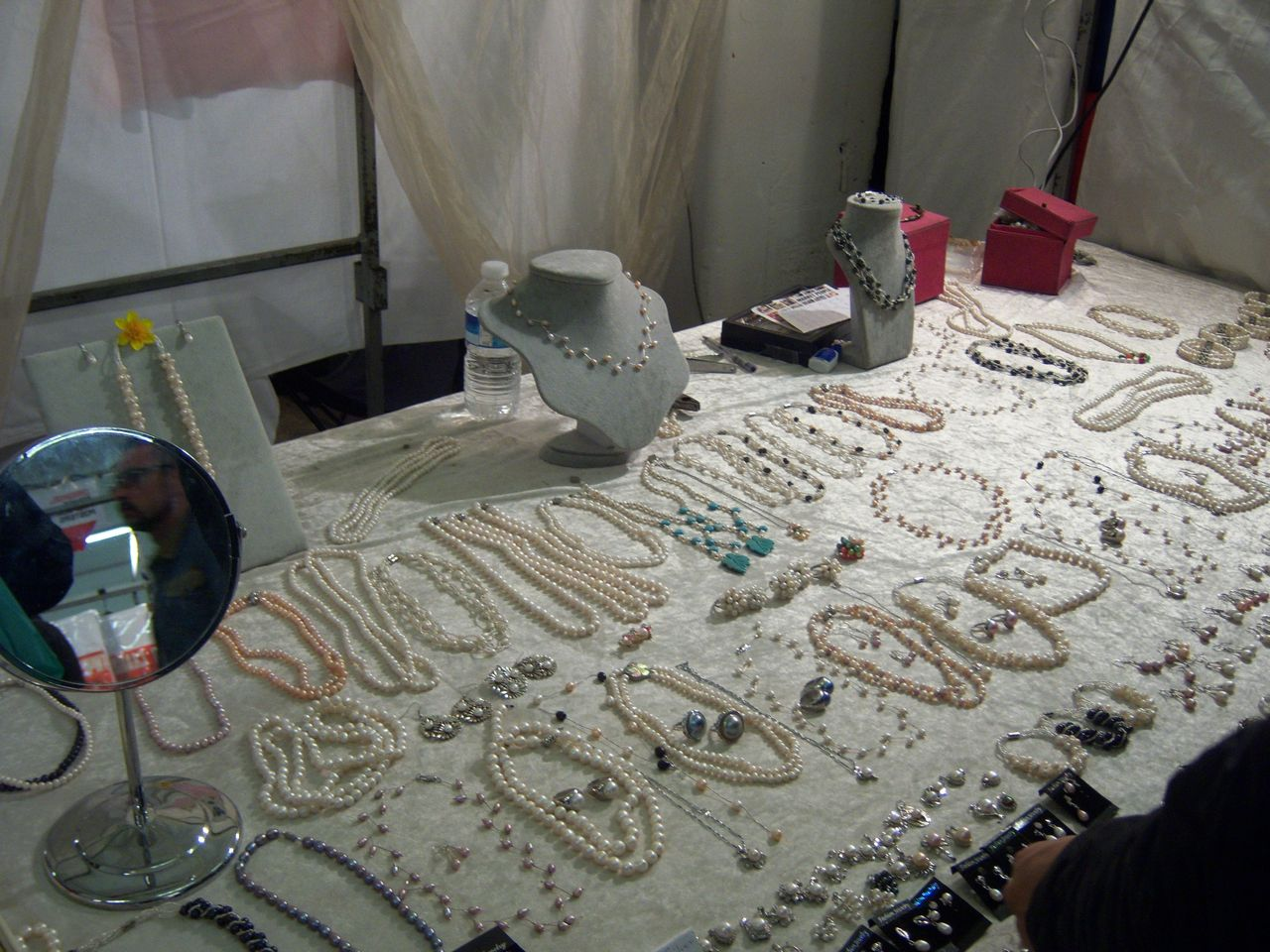
Handmade jewelry at the Upmarket

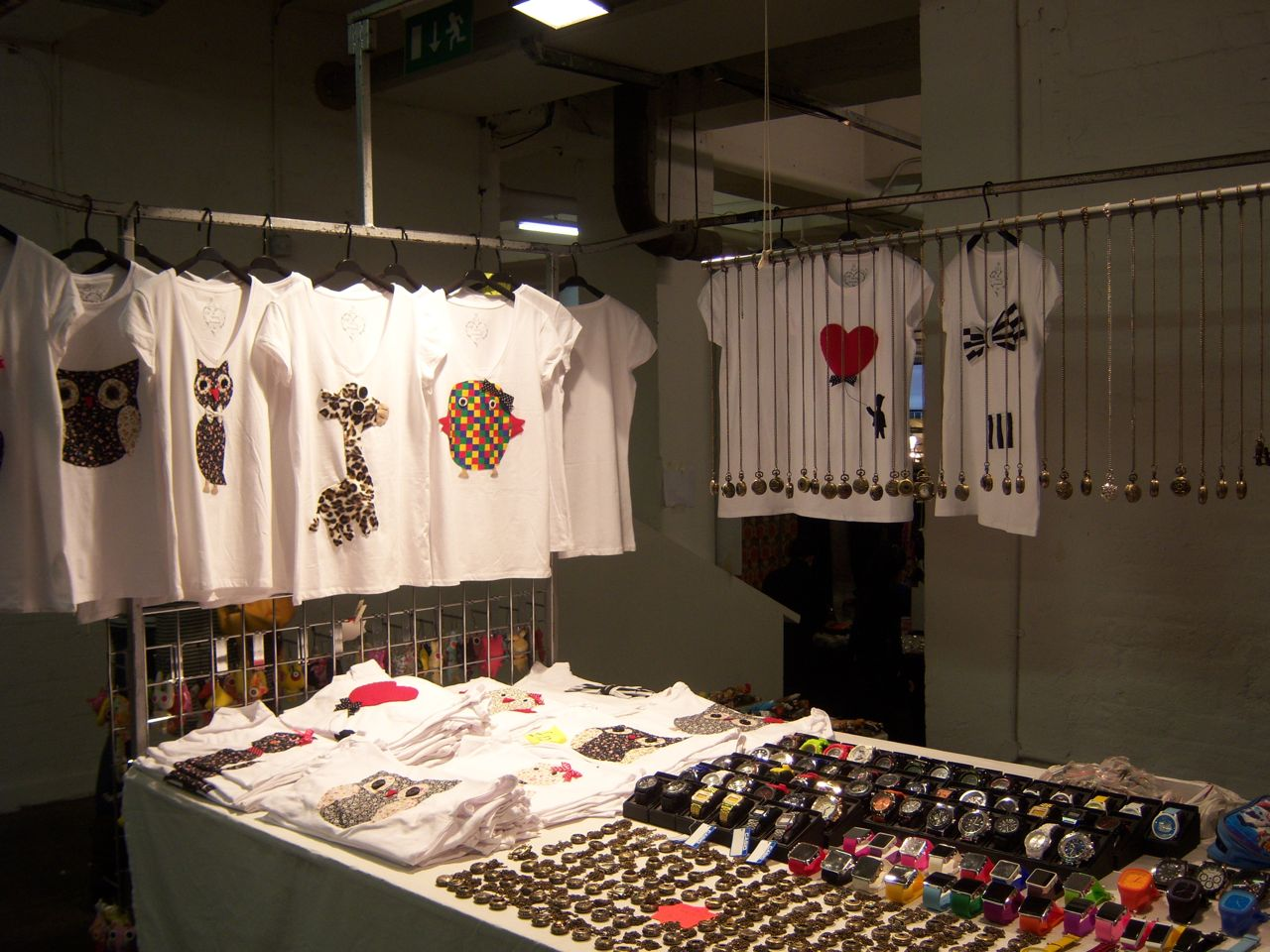
Unique clothing and accessory designs at the Sunday UpMarket

The Upmarket, opened in 2004, houses almost 100 stallholders and boasts the biggest food hall in East London. The Backyard Market, formerly an 8,000 square feet warehouse, was added in 2006. The Brick Lane Vintage Market originally operated as a monthly event beginning in 2008 and as of 2010 has been a permanent fixture onsite. The Tea Rooms was founded in 2009, and the former Boiler House food hall opened in 2010.

=== Layout ===
The Backyard Market, Brick Lane Vintage Market, Ely's Yard Food Trucks, Rinse Showrooms and Tea Rooms are all located within the confines of the Truman Brewery on Brick Lane.

The Upmarket is housed in the Truman Brewery's 'F-Block' building and is accessible from Brick Lane and Ely's Yard (just off Hanbury Street). The venue is an old service yard and one of East London's busiest roadways. Ely's Yard also hosts many events and holds other shops, bars, restaurants, and artwork by the prominent street artists Banksy and D*Face. The Backyard Market, operating by the same hours as the Tea Rooms, is located in the Brewery's U Block, on the east side of the Brewery's estate, between Dray Walk and Buxton/Quaker Street.

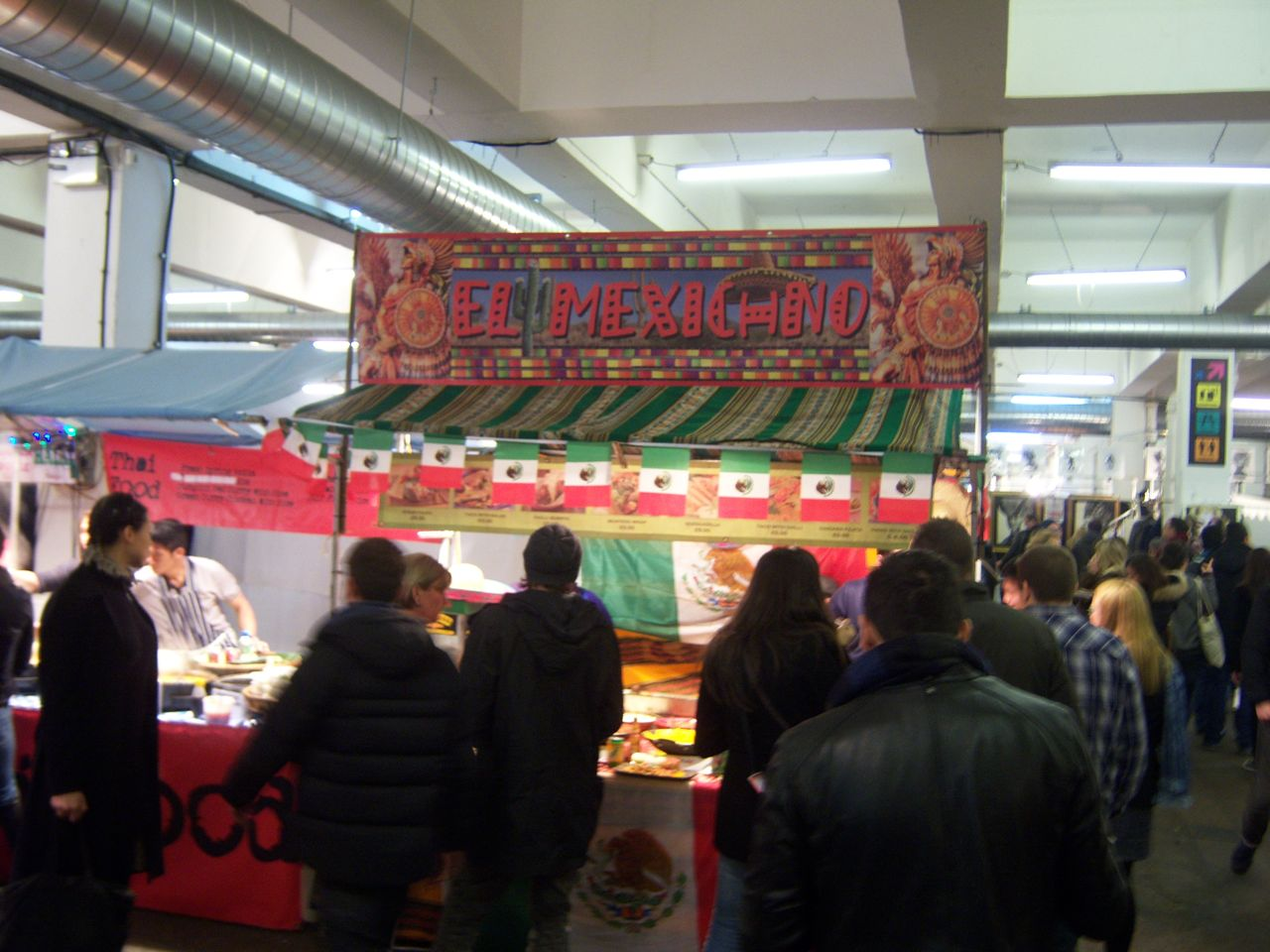
Mexican-Chinese fusion food stall at the Boiler House Food Hall in the Truman Markets

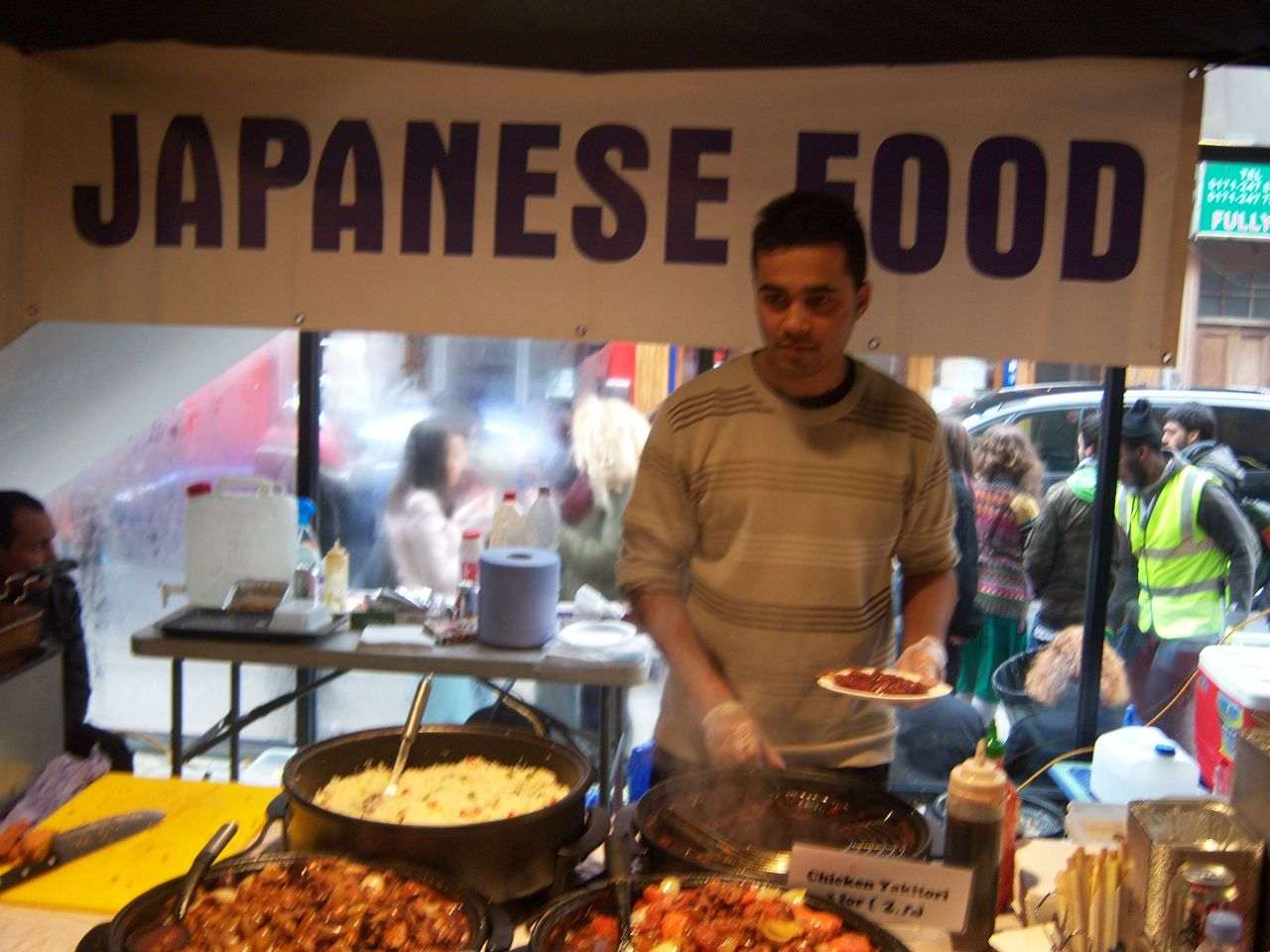
Japanese food stall at the Boiler House Food Hall in the Truman Markets

=== Backyard Market ===
The Backyard Market was established in 2006 and is one of the Truman Markets’ youngest vendors. Housing over eighty stalls, The Backyard Market is unique in that it allows young artists and designers to be part of a creative community in which they have the opportunity to showcase their work. The Backyard Market was the first of its kind in the area to open on Saturdays.

The Backyard Market offers an eclectic mix of independent businesses and retail outlets, such as cafes, boutiques, and hair salons that cater to a diverse clientele, with an emphasis on arts and crafts.

=== Brick Lane Vintage Market ===
The Brick Lane Vintage Market is composed of more than 60 small businesses owned by British and European vintage specialists offering clothing and accessories ranging from 1920s haute couture to 1990s sportswear. Also on offer are vinyl record, upcycled fashion and an array of unique, vintage trinkets.

The Brick Lane Vintage Market is open 7 days a week: Monday to Friday from 11 a.m. to 6.30 p.m., Saturdays from 11 a.m. to 6 p.m and Sundays from 10 a.m. to 6 p.m and attracts millions of visitors every year.

=== Rinse Showrooms ===
Rinse Showrooms derived its name from the community radio station Rinse FM that formerly operated from the same venue. Rinse Showrooms first opened in July 2016 and is home to a small collective of emerging, independent fashion designers. The venue is open Saturdays from 11 a.m. to 6 p.m. and Sundays from 10 a.m. to 5 p.m

=== Tea Rooms ===
The Tea Rooms, founded in 2009, is a market named for its large selection of teas and coffees and traditional baked goods as well as antiques, silk cushions, furniture, collectibles and handmade goods. It is open Saturdays from 11 a.m. to 6 p.m. and Sundays from 10 a.m. to 5 p.m.

=== Upmarket ===
The Upmarket is open every weekend: Saturday 11 a.m. from to 5.30 p.m and Sunday 10 a.m. from to 6 p.m. having first opened in September 2004. It has almost one hundred stallholders and is East London's biggest street food hall as well as selling a variety of vintage clothing, handmade accessories, illustrations, arts and crafts as well as organic produce, cakes and desserts.

Many of the items that are sold at Upmarket are one-of-a-kind items that are produced by the stallholders themselves. Stallholders frequently sell their products directly to the customers, as Upmarket is a self-reported "platform for emerging designers and organic cuisine".

=== Former Boiler House Food Hall ===
Dating as far back as the 1830s, the Truman Brewery's Boiler House served as both a historical landmark and the site of Brick Lane's former food hall, with 7,700 square feet of space. The Boiler House Food Hall was founded in 2010 and operated from an almost a decade until closing in March 2020. The venue is now predominantly used as an events space. Visitors were previously allowed to dine outside in the beer garden, or be seated inside around the great chimney at the lounge bar.

The Boiler House was home to over thirty stalls of international cuisine; the variety of dishes includes Italian, Polish, Lithuanian, Mediterranean, Mexican, Peruvian, Japanese and Caribbean-Asian fusion.

The former food hall was once a hot bed for London's burgeoning vegan street food community and was the genesis for the Truman Brewery's hugely popular 'Vegan Nights' event.

== Transport ==
The closest London Underground stations are Aldgate East and Liverpool Street. The London Overground Shoreditch High Street station is also within walking distance.

== See also ==
- History of marketing
- Market place
- Market hall
- Retail

Nearby attractions

- Christ Church, Spitalfields: nearby church, built 1729, now includes an art gallery and concert hall
- Columbia Road market: internationally known Flower Market
- Old Spitalfields Market, an ancient covered market site
- Old Truman Brewery: frequent subject for urban architecture photography, and host to photographic exhibitions
- Whitechapel Gallery: one of the first publicly funded galleries in London, renowned for its community involvement
