= Writer's Block (Just Jack song) =

Single by Just Jack

from the album Overtones
- Released: 2 October 2006 (original); 18 June 2007
- Recorded: 2006
- Genre: Alternative dance, house, downtempo
- Length: 3:43
- Label: Mercury
- Songwriter: Just Jack
- Producers: Just Jack; Jay Reynolds

Just Jack singles chronology
"Glory Days" (2007)	"Writer's Block" (2006)	"No Time" (2007)

"Writer's Block" is a single by English artist Just Jack which was recorded in 2006. It reached 74 in the UK Singles Chart in June 2007.

The spoken word sample at the beginning of the track is taken from an interview given by Mary Rand to the BBC at the 1964 Summer Olympics in Tokyo.

== Track listings ==
CD single

1. "Writer's Block"
2. "Starz in Their Eyes" (Acoustic)
