= Embers (Just Jack song) =

Single by Just Jack

from the album All Night Cinema
- Released: 29 March 2009
- Genre: Indie rock, chamber pop
- Length: 3:39; 3:15 (radio edit)
- Label: Mercury/Universal
- Songwriter: Jack Allsopp

Just Jack singles chronology
"No Time" (2007)	"Embers" (2009)	"The Day I Died" (2009)

"Embers" is a song from English recording artist Just Jack's third studio album, All Night Cinema, released digitally on 29 March 2009 and physically on 30 March 2009.

The song was added to iTunes on 28 March 2009 – a day earlier than the originally set release date.

== Charts ==
"Embers" made its debut in the United Kingdom at number 17 on the issue dated 5 April 2009, and fell to number 23 the following week. It was featured in the episode "The Freshman" in the third season of Gossip Girl and episode 2 of the fifth series of Waterloo Road. It was regularly used on BBC's The Restaurant and also appeared on CBBC's Safari 8. It was also regularly used in Sky Sports sports compilations, notably in a clip promoting the Munster v. Northampton Saints Heineken Cup match in October 2009.

Chart (2009)	Peak position
UK Singles (OCC)	17

== Release history ==
Region	Date	Format
United Kingdom	29 March 2009	Digital download
United Kingdom	30 March 2009	CD single
