= All Night Cinema =

Studio album by Just Jack
- Released: 31 August 2009
- Genre: Pop; electronica
- Length: 41:41
- Label: Mercury
- Producer: Just Jack; Jay Reynolds

Just Jack chronology
Overtones (2007)	All Night Cinema (2009)	Rough/Ready (2012)

Singles from All Night Cinema
- 1. "Embers" Released: 29 March 2009; 2. "The Day I Died" Released: 17 August 2009

Professional ratings
Review scores
Source	Rating
BBC	positive

All Night Cinema is the third studio album by British recording artist Just Jack. It was released on 31 August 2009 through Mercury Records. The lead single "Embers" was released in March 2009 and reached #17 on the UK Singles Chart. The second single was set to be "Doctor Doctor", but despite a video being made and receiving over 15,000 views, the song only got minor airplay by XFM. Due to this, the second single was "The Day I Died", released on 17 August, which surpassed "Embers" and reached #11 on the same chart. The album reached #22 on the UK album charts.

== Track listing ==
All tracks are written by Jack Allsopp, except where noted.

All Night Cinema track listing
No.	Title	Writer(s)	Length
1.	"Embers"		3:26
2.	"253"		3:59
3.	"The Day I Died"	Allsopp; Jules Porreca	3:35
4.	"Doctor Doctor"		3:34
5.	"So Wrong"		3:19
6.	"Blood"		3:35
7.	"All Night Cinema"		5:06
8.	"Astronaut"		3:44
9.	"Goth in the Disco"		3:55
10.	"Lo and Behold"		2:51
11.	"Basement"		4:17
Total length:			41:41
