= The Outer Marker =

2002 studio album by Just Jack

Studio album by Just Jack
- Released: 30 September 2002
- Genre: Hip hop; trip hop
- Length: 56:15
- Label: RG Records
- Producer: Just Jack

Just Jack chronology
| The Outer Marker (2002) | Overtones (2007) |

Singles from The Outer Marker
- 1. "Paradise (Lost & Found)" Released: 16 September 2002; 2. "Snowflakes" Released: 17 February 2003; 3. "Triple Tone Eyes" Released: 2003

The Outer Marker is the debut studio album by British recording artist Just Jack. It was released on 30 September 2002 through RG Records.

Professional ratings
Review scores
| Source | Rating |
|---|---|
| AllMusic | 4/5 stars |
| Prefix | 8/10 |

== Track listing ==
The Outer Marker track listing
| No. | Title | Writer(s) | Producer(s) | Length |
|---|---|---|---|---|
| 1. | "Let's Get Really Honest" | Jack Allsopp; Eric Stewart; Graham Gouldman | Just Jack | 3:58 |
| 2. | "Paradise (Lost & Found)" | Allsopp | Just Jack | 3:41 |
| 3. | "Lesson One" | Allsopp | Just Jack | 3:41 |
| 4. | "Snowflakes" | Allsopp; Boris Williams; Lol Tolhurst; Porl Thompson; Robert Smith; Roger O'Donnell; Simon Gallup | Just Jack | 4:54 |
| 5. | "Deep Thrills" | Allsopp | Just Jack | 4:33 |
| 6. | "Heartburn" | Allsopp; Jay Reynolds | Just Jack | 4:36 |
| 7. | "Eye to Eye" (featuring Sammy D) | Allsopp | Just Jack | 3:35 |
| 8. | "Contradictions" | Allsopp | Just Jack | 5:08 |
| 9. | "Snapshot Memories" | Allsopp | Just Jack | 5:19 |
| 10. | "Triple Tone Eyes" | Allsopp | Just Jack | 4:13 |
| 11. | "Ain't Too Sad" | Allsopp | Just Jack | 4:52 |
| 12. | "Snowflakes" (Cured by Temple of Jay Mix) | Allsopp; Williams; Tolhurst; Thompson; Smith; O'Donnell; Gallup | Just Jack | 4:17 |
| 13. | "Snowflakes" (Dan the Automator Remix) | Allsopp; Williams; Tolhurst; Thompson; Smith; O'Donnell; Gallup | Just Jack | 4:30 |
| Total length: | | | | 56:15 |

=== Notes ===
- "Let's Get Really Honest" samples 10cc's "I'm Not in Love"
- "Snowflakes" samples The Cure's "Lullaby"

== Personnel ==
Musicians

- Just Jack – vocals (all tracks), songwriting (all tracks)
- Eric Stewart – songwriting (track 1)
- Graham Gouldman – songwriting (track 1)
- Boris Williams – songwriting (tracks 4, 12–13)
- Lol Tolhurst – songwriting (tracks 4, 12–13)
- Porl Thompson – songwriting (tracks 4, 12–13)
- Robert Smith – songwriting (tracks 4, 12–13)
- Roger O'Donnell – songwriting (tracks 4, 12–13)
- Simon Gallup – songwriting (tracks 4, 12–13)
- Jay Reynolds – songwriting (track 6)
- Sammy D – vocals (track 7)

Technical

- Just Jack – production (all tracks)
- Jay Reynolds – mixing (all tracks)

== Release history ==
Release dates and formats for The Outer Marker
| Region | Date | Format(s) | Label |
|---|---|---|---|
| Various | 3 October 2025 | CD; LP; digital download | RG Records |
