= Beigel Bake =

24-hour bakery on Brick Lane, in London, England

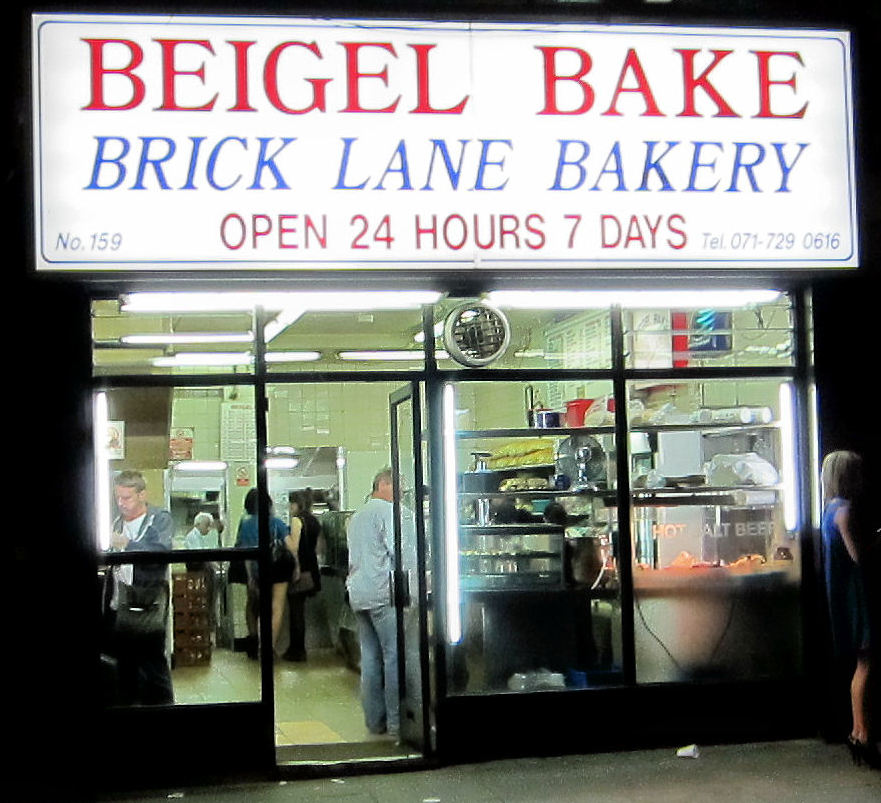
- Beigel Bake front
- Interactive map of Beigel Bake

Restaurant information
- Established: 1974
- Food type: Beigels, Bagels
- Location: Brick Lane, London, London, E1 6SB, England
- Coordinates: 51°31′28.1″N 0°4′18.5″W
- Website: bricklanebeigel.co.uk

Beigel Bake is a 24-hour bakery and shop founded in 1974, on Brick Lane in Spitalfields, London, England.

== Bakery ==
Its menu is focused on beigels, baked in the traditional Jewish style with fillings such as hot salt beef with mustard, chopped herring, and cream cheese and salmon. It also serves pastries and sweets such as Danish rolls, apple strudel, Eccles cakes and cheesecake, as well as white, rye and black bread. Beigel Bake produces 7,000 beigels every day.

The restaurant was rated three stars by Time Out London magazine in 2010 (four stars by the magazine's online users). It was also featured as a location in the photographic pictorial Life in the East End by London-based cabaret duo EastEnd Cabaret.

== Beigel offerings ==
The bakery offers traditional Jewish bakery staples; most famously their Salt beef beigel, costing around 7 pounds, and their smoked salmon and cream cheese beigel. They also offer bakery staples such as Challah, a sweet Jewish bread, eaten on Shabbat. They also offer 4 kinds of unfilled beigel:

- plain beigel
- poppy seed beigel
- poppy seed platzel
- onion platzel

== See also ==
- List of bakeries
