= Overtones (album) =

Studio album by Just Jack
- Released: 29 January 2007
- Recorded: 2006
- Genre: Hip hop; house
- Length: 57:40
- Label: Mercury
- Producer: Just Jack; Jay Reynolds

Just Jack chronology
| The Outer Marker (2002) | Overtones (2007) | All Night Cinema (2009) |

Singles from Overtones
- 1. "Starz in Their Eyes" Released: 15 January 2007; 2. "Glory Days" Released: 16 April 2007; 3. "Writer's Block" Released: 18 June 2007; 4. "No Time" Released: 10 September 2007

Professional ratings
Review scores
| Source | Rating |
|---|---|
| AbsolutePunk.net | 80% link |
| AllMusic | link |
| Dotmusic | 2007 |
| Entertainment.ie | Archived 27 September 2007 at the Wayback Machine |
| The Independent | 3/5 stars |

Overtones is the second studio album by British recording artist Just Jack. It was released on 29 January 2007 through Mercury Records. The album includes the single "Starz in Their Eyes", which reached #2 on the UK Singles Chart, as well as the singles "Glory Days", "Writer's Block", and "No Time".

== Track listing ==
All tracks are written by Jack Allsopp, except where noted.

Overtones track listing
| No. | Title | Writer(s) | Length |
|---|---|---|---|
| 1. | "Writer's Block" | | 3:42 |
| 2. | "Glory Days" | | 3:39 |
| 3. | "Disco Friends" | | 3:00 |
| 4. | "Starz in Their Eyes" | | 4:55 |
| 5. | "Lost" | Allsopp; Ralph Lamb; Andrew Ross | 5:48 |
| 6. | "I Talk Too Much" | Allsopp; Ali Love | 4:16 |
| 7. | "Hold On" | Allsopp; Adam Phillips | 2:24 |
| 8. | "Symphony of Sirens" | | 4:21 |
| 9. | "Life Stories" | | 3:52 |
| 10. | "No Time" | | 4:27 |
| 11. | "Mourning Morning" | Allsopp; Jules Porreca | 4:06 |
| 12. | "Spectacular Failures" (includes hidden track "Koolaid") | | 13:10 |
| Total length: | | | 57:40 |

Notes

- The US edition of the album includes a reworked version of "I Talk Too Much" featuring Kylie Minogue with a length of 3:50.

US bonus track
| No. | Title | Length |
|---|---|---|
| 13. | "Electrickery" | 7:27 |
