= No Time (Just Jack song) =

Single by Just Jack

from the album Overtones
- Released: 10 September 2007
- Recorded: 2006
- Genre: House, funk
- Length: 3:27
- Label: Mercury
- Songwriter: Jack Allsopp

Just Jack singles chronology
"Starz in Their Eyes" (2007)	"No Time" (2007)	"Writer's Block" (2007)

"No Time" is a single by UK artist Just Jack which was recorded in 2006. It reached 76 in the UK Singles Chart in April 2007.

The music video is about a television presenter and his job on a TV Show.

== Two Versions ==
There are two versions to the song. The album version, and the single version, which is more electronic.

== Track listings ==
CD single

1. "No Time"
2. "No Time" (Wideboys Remix)

== Charts ==
Chart (2007)	Peak position
UK Singles (OCC)	76
