= The Day I Died =

Single by Just Jack

from the album All Night Cinema
- Released: 17 August 2009
- Length: 3:35; 3:28 (Jay's Radio Mix)
- Label: Mercury/Universal
- Songwriters: Jack Allsopp, Jules Porreca
- Producers: Jack Allsopp, Jay Reynolds

Just Jack singles chronology
| "Embers" (2009) | "The Day I Died" (2009) | "Doctor Doctor" (2009) |

Music video
- The Dempseys – Just Jack – The Day I Died (HD) on Vimeo

"The Day I Died" is the second single from electronic music artist Just Jack taken from his third studio album All Night Cinema. It was released on 17 August 2009. The song made the Radio 1 A-list, and XFM B-list, before the single was officially released. The song is fairly upbeat but somewhat satirical, as the lyrics illustrate slight, fortunate changes to an otherwise uneventful day-by-day life, implying the protagonist was decidedly unlucky. It took Just Jack three years to complete the song, after he wrote the first verse and a half.

== Jay's Radio Mix ==
The song featured in the music video is actually called 'The Day I Died (Jay's Radio Mix)'. The album version 'The Day I Died' is more acoustic, whereas the more famous, 'Jay's Radio Mix', is more electronic and upbeat. Jay's Radio Mix is a radio edit version which is featured in the music video. This version reached the charts, and was wrongly recognised as just 'The Day I Died', which is false as the original acoustic version on the album is, which had little attention.

== Music video ==
James Nesbitt in the promotional music video for "The Day I Died"

The music video, premiered on 28 July 2009. Though Just Jack's song tells a story, the video does not follow it literally, and presents an expanded expression of the be-here-now theme: appreciating the small details of life before it is too late. The video was directed by Ben and Joe Dempsey and stars Northern Irish actor James Nesbitt, as a man waking up to the "best day of his life" only to discover at the end that he has already been killed by a taxi and has been reliving that day.

As the video (and the day) begin, the man wakes up fully dressed, although visibly injured and with torn clothing. At breakfast, his son plays out an accident between toy cars and brings in a toy ambulance, foreshadowing the final death scene. During the day, the man's injuries and torn suit are not noticed by his family or the other characters, and are easily missed on the first viewing, but they suggest that we are seeing the day reinvented by the dead man, or at least informed by the dead man's hindsight perspective. This could be his "do-over," how he would have lived the day had he known it was his last. Nesbitt plays the off-to-work goodbye scene as a man intent on making the most of what could be a final farewell. Another interpretation could be that we are not seeing a re-write of the day but a re-reading of the day as it was; the book he reads in the park is The Day I Died (a prop created for the video). The sense of an imminent conclusion is emphasized by his closing the book after reading only the last page. In this light the torn jacket could symbolize the mark of death, the unseen but inevitable future that awaits us all.

When the man arrives at the accident scene he is at first one of the spectators, then as he walks into the center, the crowd claps. This applause puzzles many viewers because it is unlike the "normal" actions of the other characters. Like the song, the video leaves room for one to write in one's own conclusions. In fact, the video is directed with a deliberate ambiguity from the opening shot, in which the bruise on the man's face vanishes. And as just one interpretation of the song, the video illustrates the breadth of possibilities inherent in Just Jack's creation.

Just Jack is in the video as a paramedic at the end declaring the man dead. Elton John listened to the song, and decided James Nesbitt was the only man for the role, and called him personally.

== Charts ==
The song spent 8 weeks on the chart. Entering at number 11, its highest position.

=== Weekly charts ===
| Chart (2009) | Peak position |
|---|---|
| UK Singles (OCC) | 11 |

=== Year-end charts ===
| Chart (2009) | Position |
|---|---|
| UK Singles (OCC) | 192 |

== Certifications ==
| Region | Certification | Certified units/sales |
|---|---|---|
| United Kingdom (BPI) | Silver | 200,000^{‡} |
^{‡} Sales+streaming figures based on certification alone.

== Release history ==
| Region | Date | Format |
|---|---|---|
| United Kingdom | 16 August 2009 | Digital download |
| United Kingdom | 17 August 2009 | CD single |
