= Glory Days (Just Jack song) =

Single by Just Jack

from the album Overtones
- Released: 16 April 2007
- Recorded: 2006
- Genre: Alternative hip hop
- Length: 3:39
- Label: Mercury
- Songwriter(s): Jack Allsopp

Just Jack singles chronology
"Starz in Their Eyes" (2007)	"Glory Days" (2007)	"Writer's Block" (2007)

"Glory Days" is a single by UK artist Just Jack which was recorded in 2006. It reached 32 in the UK Singles Chart in April 2007.

Most of the music video was filmed down the world-famous Brick Lane in the East End of London.

== Track listings ==
CD single

1. "Glory Days"
2. "Glory Days" (DJ Mehdi Remix)

== Charts ==
Chart (2007)	Peak position
UK Singles (OCC)	32
