= Cycle to Work scheme =

UK Government tax exemption initiative

Cycle to Work scheme is a UK Government tax exemption initiative introduced in the Finance Act 1999 to promote healthier journeys to work and to reduce environmental pollution. It allows employers to loan cycles and cyclists' safety equipment to employees as a tax-free benefit. The exemption was one of a series of measures introduced under the Government's Green Transport Plan. A Cycle to Work scheme does not require the prior approval of HMRC.

On 6 August 2010 HMRC issued a statement to clarify the fair market value, which should be charged if the employees want to take ownership of the bike at the end of the repayment. Some of the providers have always recommended continued use at no further charge as the best option to avoid any additional cost and remain within the scheme guidelines.

On 28 July 2011, HMRC published guidance stating that VAT needs to be accounted for on Salary Sacrifice payments for Cycle to Work from 1 January 2012. Employers can claim back VAT under some circumstances, but may no longer pass the VAT savings on to the employee.

== Who is eligible ==
Employers of all sizes across the public, private and voluntary sectors can implement a tax exempt loan scheme for their employees. The employees wishing to participate should be paid through the PAYE system. The scheme is not available to the self-employed or employees on the National Minimum Wage and any salary sacrifice arrangement must not reduce an employee's cash earnings below the National Minimum Wage threshold.

== What equipment is included under the tax exemption ==
Eligible equipment includes cycles and cyclists' safety equipment. The tax exemption defines a "cycle" as 'a bicycle, a tricycle, or a cycle having four or more wheels, not being in any case a motor vehicle'. An electrically assisted pedal cycle can be included under the scheme.

Cyclists' safety equipment is not defined in the legislation.

== What value of equipment can be supplied ==
There is no limit on the total value of the equipment including the cycle. It is possible to loan two cycles to one employee if, for example, that employee needed a cycle at either end of a train journey between their home and place of work.

However normally employers will wish to recover the cost of the equipment from the employee under a hire agreement. The employee can still make the tax savings because the hire payments can be made from their gross salary via a salary sacrifice scheme.

Office of Fair Trading (OFT): Group consumer credit licence (expired)

Consumer Credit Licences ceased to exist with the closure of the Office of Fair Trading (OFT) on 31 March 2014. The Financial Conduct Authority (FCA) now regulates the consumer credit market, by granting authorisation to firms for consumer credit activities, in line with its regulatory regime.

Financial Conduct Authority (FCA)

Each of the activities regulated by the FCA are outlined in Chapter 2.7 of the Perimeter Guidance Manual (PERG), in the FCA Handbook Online. This includes both consumer credit and other regulated financial services activities.

In relation to Cycle to Work schemes there is a specific exemption which is detailed under PERG 2.11.3.

Under the OFT group licence, employers required separate authorisation for cycle orders over £1000. The specific exemption for cycle to work schemes under the FCA also only covers orders up to £1000. However, not-for-profit bodies are also specifically exempt from FCA regulation under PERG 2.3.2, regardless of the value of the cycle. Other employers may also be exempt under the 'business test' which is defined in PERG 2.3.3. FCA regulation is only required where employers are operating a scheme 'by way of business', a term which relies on various tests outlined in the perimeter guidance.

Unless employers apply for FCA regulation, cycle to work hire agreements should not include any reference to being regulated under the Consumer Credit Act. The inclusion of such a statement may expose employers to consumer protection claims as the document may be considered to be misleading.

Where necessary, applications for authorisation are made via the FCA.

It is possible to run schemes in-house or purchase Salary Sacrifice and Hire agreements online. Some Cycle to Work schemes may use vouchers which limit where bikes can be bought, or are only on items at full RRP and exclude sale items, resulting in a total purchase cost greater than the market value.

== Taxation ==
The exemption removes the tax charge that would otherwise apply to cycles and cyclists' safety equipment loaned to employees provided the following conditions are met:

- Ownership of the equipment is not transferred to the employee during the loan period
- Employees use the equipment mainly for qualifying journeys, meaning for more than half of its use. A qualifying journey is one between home and a workplace, or part of such a journey (for example, cycling to the station), a journey between one workplace and another, or, under HMRC guidance, a journey on a working day between a workplace and shops or other amenities within ten miles one way. For an employee whose home is itself a workplace, a working-day ride to local amenities qualifies in the same way.
- The Cycle to Work scheme is made available generally to employees of the employer concerned, and not confined to directors or offered to them on more favourable terms.

== Implementation ==
The exemption, introduced by the Finance Act 1999, is now set out in section 244 of the Income Tax (Earnings and Pensions) Act 2003. Employees hire a cycle and cyclist equipment through a Salary sacrifice arrangement, giving up part of their pre-tax salary in return. The employer or provider retains ownership during the hire, and the equipment must be used mainly for qualifying journeys.

Employers can run a scheme themselves, but in practice most contract a third party cycle to work scheme provider. Providers administer the scheme, ensure it complies with legislation and advise employers on salary sacrifice. Providers include independent employee benefit companies and also cycle retailers operating their own schemes. Some examples would include Cycle scheme, Halfords' Cycle2Work and DASH Cycle to Work.

At the end of the hire period, the employee may extend the hire, return the equipment, or buy it under a separate agreement made at that time. Any option to buy must not form part of the original hire agreement, as this would make it a hire-purchase agreement and remove the tax exemption. If ownership is transferred without payment the employee is taxed on a benefit in kind. HM Revenue and Customs publishes acceptable disposal values based on the cycle's original price and age. Extending the hire without transferring ownership creates no tax charge, provided the conditions of the exemption continue to be met.

== Cycle to Work Alliance ==
Some of the biggest scheme providers have recently started Cycle to Work Alliance, a legal group to represent the interests of the scheme providers and users in negotiations with HMRC.

== Other countries ==
Ireland operates a similar scheme under which the cyclist owns the bicycle. An employer can buy a bicycle and, if wished, safety equipment for an employee, and the benefit is not taxable provided the cost does not exceed the relevant limit. Since 1 January 2023 there have been three limits, depending on the type of bicycle purchased: €3,000 for cargo and ecargo bikes, €1,500 for pedelecs and ebikes, and €1,250 for other bicycles. The exemption can be used once in any four-year period, and the associated tax relief can reduce the effective cost by up to roughly half, depending on the cyclist's marginal rate of tax.
