= Black Eagle Brewery =

Brewery building in London Borough of Tower Hamlets, England

Coordinates: 51°31′15.88″N 0°4′16.82″W

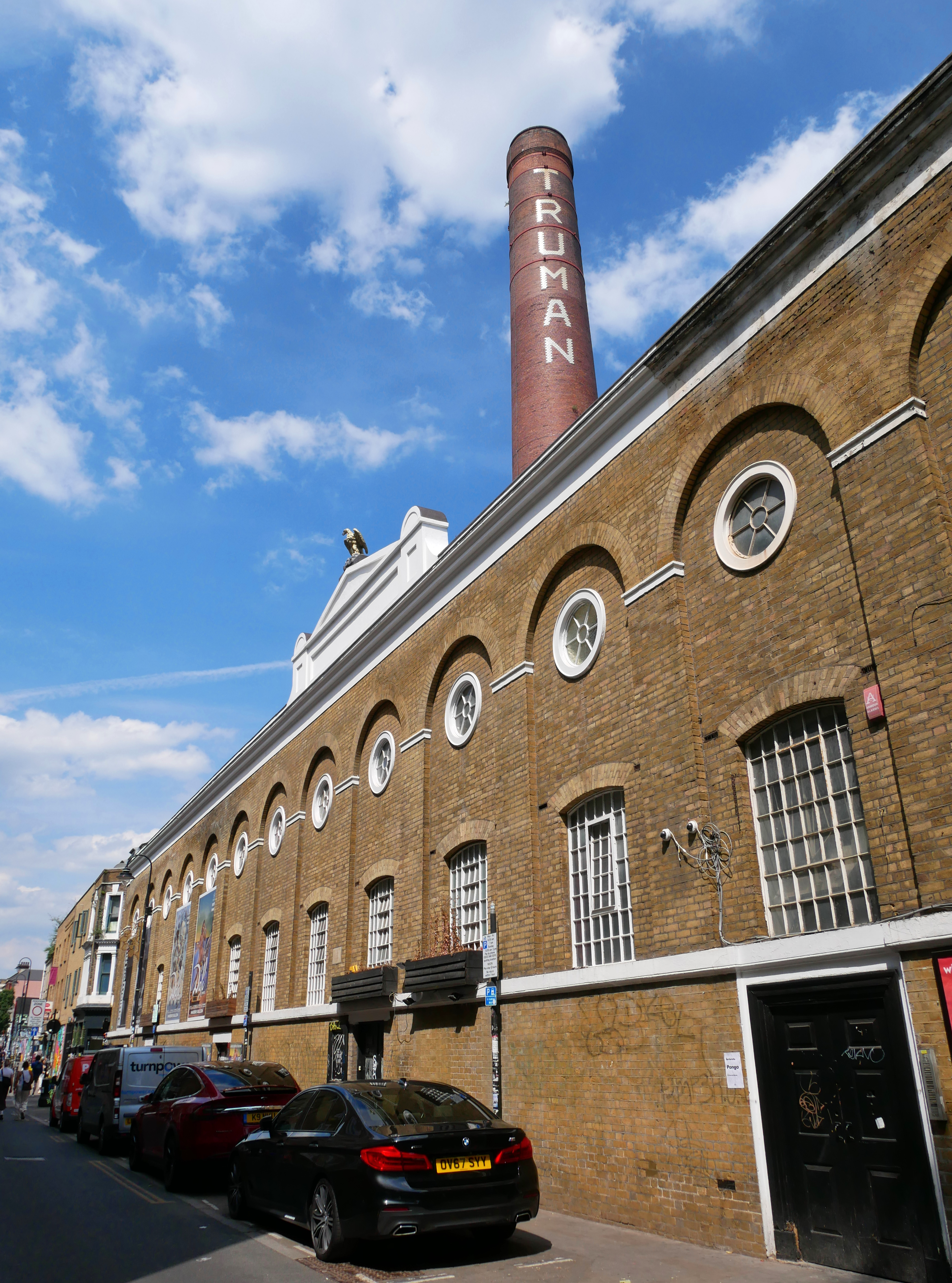
The stables of the brewery

The Black Eagle Brewery is the former brewing plant of Truman's Brewery located around Brick Lane in the Spitalfields area, in the London Borough of Tower Hamlets. Truman's subsequently became Truman, Hanbury and Buxton. By 1853, the Black Eagle Brewery was the largest in the world, with an annual production of 400,000 barrels.

The former buildings, warehouses and yards were redeveloped by The Zeloof Partnership as the "Old Truman Brewery" and now house over 250 businesses, ranging from cultural venues to art galleries, restaurants, and retail shops. The Director's House and former Brew House are listed buildings.

== History ==
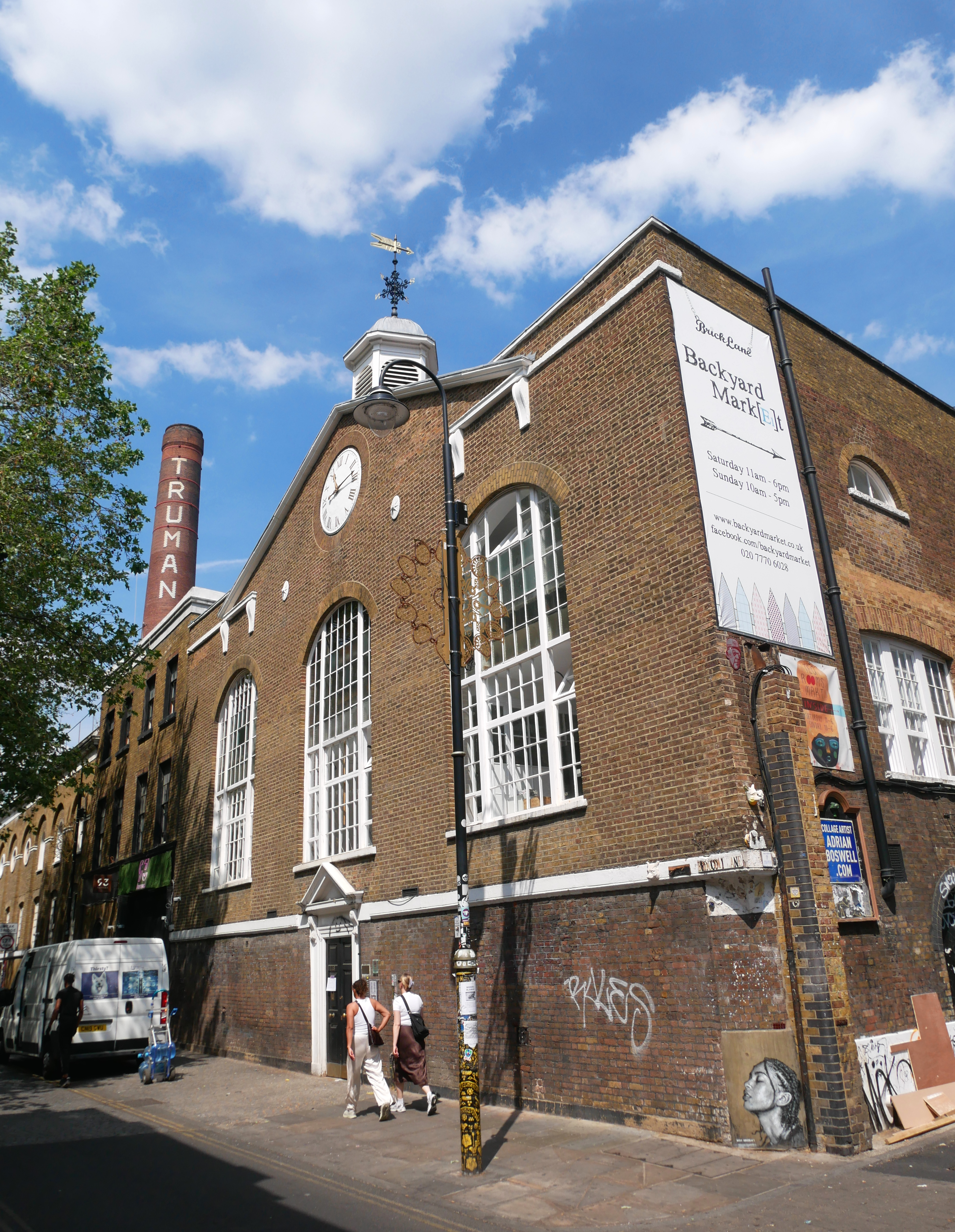
The Vat House at the brewery

The original brewery was probably established by the Bucknall family, who leased the site in the seventeenth century. The site's first associations with brewing can be traced back to 1666 when a Joseph Truman is recorded as joining William Bucknall's Brewhouse in Brick Lane. Part of the site was located on Black Eagle Street, hence the brewery's name. Truman appears to have acquired the lease of the brewery in 1679, upon the death of William Bucknell. Through the Truman family's efforts – not least those of Sir Benjamin Truman (who joined the firm in 1722) – the business expanded rapidly over the following 200 years. By 1748 the Black Eagle Brewery was the third largest brewery in London, and likely the world, with 40,000 barrels produced annually.

In the mid-18th century Huguenot immigrants introduced a new beverage flavoured with hops, which proved very popular. Initially, Truman's imported hops from Belgium, but Kent farmers were soon encouraged to grow hops to help the brewery meet growing demand.

Sir Benjamin died in March 1780 and, without a son to take on the business, it passed to his grandsons. In 1789, the brewery was taken over by Sampson Hanbury (Hanbury had been a partner since 1780; the Truman family became 'sleeping partners'). Hanbury's nephew, Thomas Fowell Buxton, joined the company in 1808, improved the brewing process, converted the works to steam power and, with the rapid expansion and improvement of Britain's road and rail transport networks, the Black Eagle label soon became famous across Britain (by 1835, when Buxton took over the business upon Hanbury's death, the brewery was producing some 200,000 barrels (32,000 m^{3}) of porter a year).

The Brick Lane brewery – now known as Truman, Hanbury, Buxton & Co – took on new partners in 1816, the Pryor brothers (the company's owners were renowned for their good treatment of their workers - providing free schooling – and for their support of abolitionism). By 1853 the brewery was the largest in the world, producing 400,000 barrels of beer each year, with a site covering six acres.

However, the company also faced competition from breweries based outside London – notably in Burton upon Trent, where the water was particularly suitable for brewing – and in 1873 the company acquired a brewery (Phillips) in Burton and began to build a major new brewery, named the Black Eagle after the original London site.

In 1888, Truman, Hanbury, Buxton & Co became a public company with shareholders, but the balance of production was now shifting to Burton.

The Brick Lane brewery site covered six acres by 1898.

The Brick Lane facility remained active through a take-over by the Grand Metropolitan Group in 1971 and a merger with Watney Mann in 1972, but it was in terminal decline. It eventually closed in 1989.

=== In fiction ===
In Charles Dickens’ novel David Copperfield (1850), the character Mrs Micawber makes specific reference to Messrs Truman, Hanbury and Buxton:

I have long felt the brewing business to be particularly adapted to Mr Micawber. Look at Barclay and Perkins! Look at Truman, Hanbury, and Buxton! It is on that extensive footing that Mr Micawber, I know from my own knowledge of him, is calculated to shine; and the profits, I am told, are e-NOR—mous! But if Mr Micawber cannot get into those firms—which decline to answer his letters, when he offers his services even in an inferior capacity—what is the use of dwelling upon that idea? (Chapter 28)

In 2014/15 the Black Eagle Brewery featured in the fifth episode of the third series of the fictional BBC TV period drama Ripper Street, where protective employees harassed and killed London publicans who had changed supplier and were buying wares from breweries in Burton-upon-Trent. While a fictional account, the storyline reflected the real concerns that the London breweries had in late Victorian times, as rival product was increasingly brought from the north of England by the expanding railway network.

== Old Truman Brewery ==
The old brewery buildings have become home to an arts and events centre and various shops and bars and it is now owned by The Zeloof Partnership. Business and leisure share the regenerated 11-acre (45,000 m^{2}) site for restaurants, bars, shops, businesses, events spaces, offices, workshops and two weekly fashion markets. The buildings were expected to undergo significant changes as part of the Tower Hamlets Council's 2007 'City Fringe Area Action Plan'. The site was the location for the second Summer of Sonic event, a convention for Sonic the Hedgehog fans, which took place on 29 August 2009.

In 2021 the owners proposed redevelopment of the site which was opposed by a community group, which raised funding for a judicial review.
