= Just Jack =

English musician (born 1975)

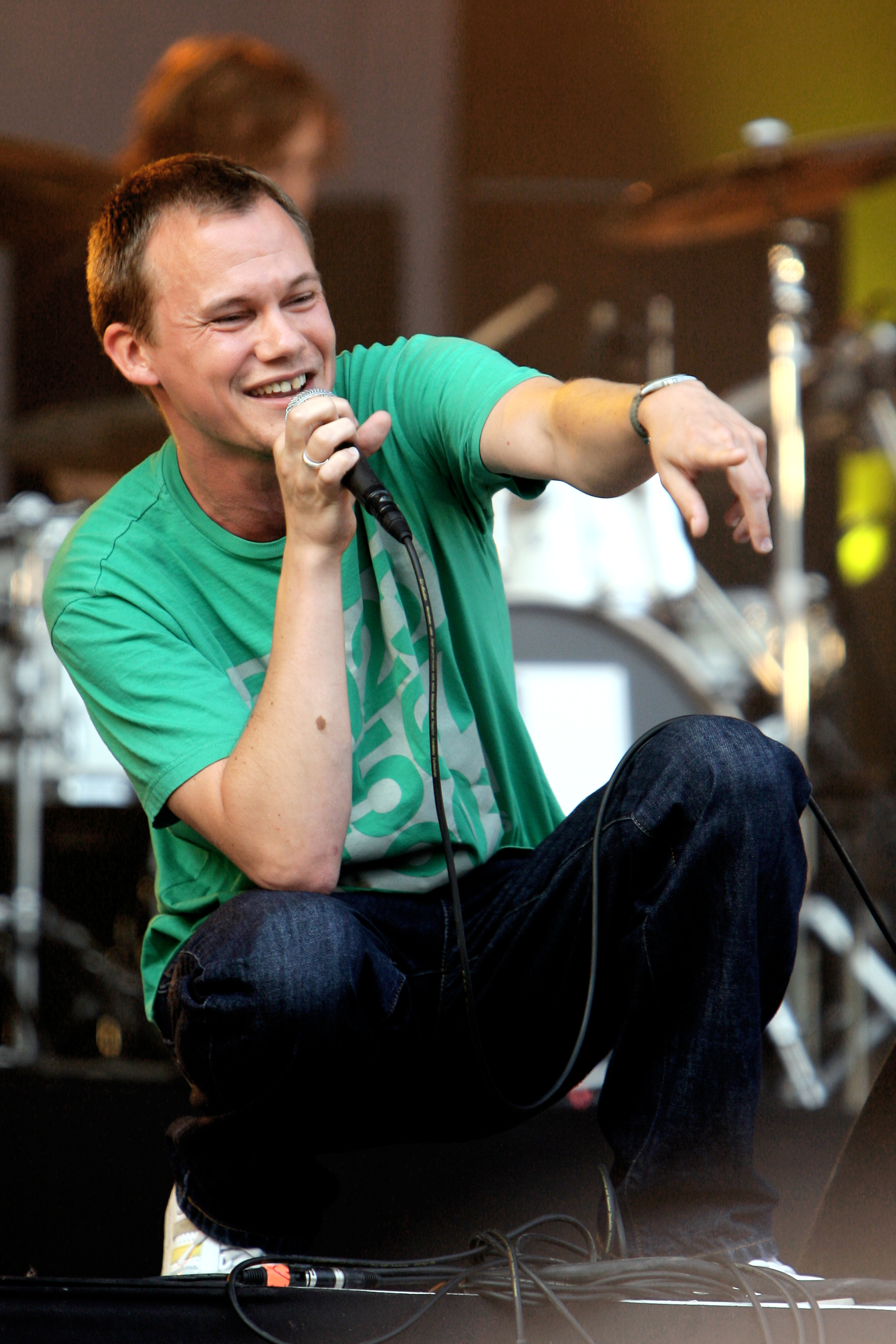
- Just Jack performing at Rock en Seine in August 2007

Background information
- Born: Jack Christopher Allsopp; 12 May 1975 (age 51)
- Origin: Camden Town, London, England
- Genres: Hip hop; UK garage
- Years active: 2002–present
- Labels: RGR Records (2002–2003); Mercury (2006–2009); Rocket Records (2016–present)
- Website: www.justjackmusic.co.uk

Jack Christopher Allsopp (born 12 May 1975), known by his stage name Just Jack, is an English musician from Camden Town, London. He first came to prominence with the release of his 2007 single "Starz in Their Eyes", which reached number two on the UK Singles Chart. He has also since been known for the songs "Embers", peaking at number 17, and "The Day I Died", which peaked at number 11, and the track "Writer's Block".

== Background ==
Born in Camden, Allsopp grew up listening to dance music including breakdance, electro hip hop and house. An amateur breakdancer at eight, he started DJing at the age of 15 and he soon became submerged in DJ culture and UK garage.

After completing a degree in furniture design at Kingston University, he enrolled in a community music production course, so that he could better his awareness of sampling and its potential for use. He went on to practice on perfecting his sound by night and to take on a series of jobs by day.

== Career ==
Allsopp's debut album, titled The Outer Marker, released in 2002 by the independent label RGR Records, was a collection of songs about modern life, relationships, and the pressures of social situations. The album spawned three singles "Paradise (Lost & Found)", "Snowflakes" and "Triple Tone Eyes". "Snowflakes", his first song to enter the charts at number 164, samples The Cure's song "Lullaby" from their album Disintegration.

He did not gain fame until 2007, following his TV debut on BBC2's Later... with Jools Holland, and then on the Channel 4 show The Friday Night Project, where he performed the single "Starz in Their Eyes", which reached number two in the UK Singles Chart. The following three singles from the album Overtones, "Glory Days", "Writer's Block" and "No Time" did not make the top thirty. "Starz in Their Eyes" was also featured in the Dolce & Gabbana Summer 2008 fashion show, and the Xbox 360 Kinect game Kinect Sports. He also collaborated with Kylie Minogue on the song "I Talk Too Much", for the American release of Overtones.

Allsopp performed at Glastonbury Festival, V Festival and T4 on the Beach in 2007 and again at Glastonbury Festival in 2009. He also performed at Guilfest in 2010.

He released his third album All Night Cinema on 31 August 2009, preceded by its first single "Embers", which had its premiere on BBC Radio 1 on 12 January 2009, and second single "The Day I Died", which became Allsopp's second highest-charting single on the UK Singles Chart, peaking at number 11. Both singles peaked inside the top 20. The original choice for second single was "Doctor Doctor" but the single release was subsequently postponed.

In August 2011, Allsopp announced on Facebook "So close to finishing a 5 track EP. Just need to find a home for it..." Though later didn't feel like the final track was completed, he released a statement in November 2011 saying "A bit of background info... As some of you will know I recently finished a 4-track EP of new songs. It was going to be 5, but the last song didn't feel properly finished and didn't really work with the others. I'll save it for a later date. Most of the music was recorded at home and, for the first time, I mixed the songs myself. They are a little lo-fi and intentionally not 'radio' or 'singles'. I tried to make them sound warm and natural and intimate, basically the kind of music I would listen to myself. I haven't found a label to put them out through yet, but I wanted you to hear them anyway. The first will be up on Monday (for a few days) via a link to my Soundcloud, and the others will go up on the following 3 Mondays. Over and out." This 4-track EP was later titled Rough/Ready and made available as a free download on 17 April 2012 through the newly designed official Just Jack website. In September 2014, Allsopp released a new EP titled Winning EP.

A third EP titled Life Lessons was released on 6 May 2016 through The Rocket Record Company, his first release on a label since 2009.

He went on to release his fourth album, “What We Did Today” on 27 October in 2017. On 20 September 2019, he released a 7-track EP called Laughing & Crying which contained four new originals and three acoustic covers.

== Discography ==
=== Studio albums ===
List of studio albums, with selected chart positions and certifications
Title	Album details	Peak chart positions						Certifications
Title	Album details	UK	BEL (FL)	FRA	IRL	NLD	SWI	Certifications
The Outer Marker	Released: 30 September 2002; Label: RGR; Formats: CD, LP, digital download	—	—	—	—	—	—	
Overtones	Released: 29 January 2007; Label: Mercury; Formats: CD, digital download	6	74	25	11	74	69	BPI: Gold
All Night Cinema	Released: 31 August 2009; Label: Mercury; Formats: CD, digital download	22	—	99	—	—	—	
What We Did Today	Released: 27 October 2017; Label: Tristar Records	—	—	—	—	—	—	
Laughing & Crying	Released: 20 September 2019	—	—	—	—	—	—	
Back To Ford Lane	Released: 8 October 2021	—	—	—	—	—	—	
That Was Now	Released: 3 March 2023; Label: Nearly Native	—	—	—	—	—	—	
"—" denotes a recording that did not chart or was not released in that territory.

=== Singles ===
List of singles, with selected chart positions and certifications, showing year released and album name
Title	Year	Peak chart positions										Certifications	Album
Title	Year	UK	BEL (FL)	BEL (WA)	EU	GER	IRL	ITA	NLD	SCO	SWI	Certifications	Album
"Paradise (Lost & Found)"	2002	—	—	—	—	—	—	—	—	—	—		The Outer Marker
"Snowflakes"	2003	164	—	—	—	—	—	—	—	—	—		The Outer Marker
"Triple Tone Eyes"	2003	—	—	—	—	—	—	—	—	—	—		The Outer Marker
"Starz in Their Eyes"	2007	2	29	57	2	64	2	10	57	3	26	BPI: Platinum	Overtones
"Glory Days"	2007	32	—	—	—	—	—	—	—	33	—		Overtones
"Writer's Block"	2007	74	67	—	—	—	—	—	—	47	—		Overtones
"No Time"	2007	76	—	—	—	—	—	—	—	—	— (Note: "No Time" did not enter the Swiss Singles chart, but charted at number 78 on the Swiss Airplay chart.)		Overtones
"Embers"	2009	17	—	—	19	—	—	—	—	—	—		All Night Cinema
"The Day I Died"	2009	11	—	—	14	—	—	—	—	—	—	BPI: Silver	All Night Cinema
"Alchemist"	2016	—	—	—	—	—	—	—	—	—	—		Life Lessons
"—" denotes a recording that did not chart or was not released in that territory.
