= Starz in Their Eyes =

2007 single by Just Jack

Single by Just Jack

from the album Overtones
- Released: 15 January 2007
- Genre: Disco; funk; indie pop
- Length: 4:55 (original version); 3:13 (radio edit)
- Label: Mercury
- Songwriter: Jack Allsopp
- Producers: Jay Reynolds; Jack Allsopp

Just Jack singles chronology
"Triple Tone Eyes" (2003)	"Starz in Their Eyes" (2007)	"Glory Days" (2007)

"Starz in Their Eyes" is a song by British recording artist Just Jack. Released on 15 January 2007, it was the lead single from his second studio album, Overtones (2007), which was released two weeks later. The song reached number two on the UK Singles Chart on 21 January 2007.

== Music video ==
The music video, directed by Christian Bevilacqua, was released on 13 November 2006. It was also featured in the Dolce & Gabbana Summer 2008 fashion show. The song itself depicts "flop stars" and the negative side to fame and explores the idea of others benefitting financially from the fame of celebrities.

== Samples ==
The song was sampled twice by British singer PinkPantheress in two separate songs. She first sampled the song in her 2021 single "Attracted to You", and later in "Stars", a track from her 2025 mixtape Fancy That.

== Charts ==
=== Weekly charts ===
Chart (2007)	Peak position
Belgium (Ultratop 50 Flanders)	29
Belgium (Ultratip Bubbling Under Wallonia)	7
Europe (Eurochart Hot 100)	9
Germany (GfK)	64
Hungary (Dance Top 40)	40
Hungary (Editors' Choice Top 40)	26
Ireland (IRMA)	2
Italy (FIMI)	10
Netherlands (Single Top 100)	57
Scotland Singles (Official Charts)	3
Slovakia Airplay (ČNS IFPI)	34
Switzerland (Schweizer Hitparade)	26
UK Singles (Official Charts)	2
UK Dance (Official Charts)	8

=== Year-end charts ===
Chart (2007)	Position
Europe (Eurochart Hot 100)	57
UK Singles (OCC)	23

== Certifications ==
Region	Certification	Certified units/sales
United Kingdom (BPI)	Platinum	600,000^{‡}
^{‡} Sales+streaming figures based on certification alone.
