= Jack the Ripper (miniseries) =

1988 British crime drama TV serial

- Cover art for the 2002 DVD release
- Genre: Mystery; Drama; Crime
- Directed by: David Wickes
- Starring: Michael Caine; Lewis Collins; Jane Seymour
- Music by: John Cameron
- Countries of origin: United Kingdom; United States
- Original language: English
- No. of episodes: 2

Production
- Executive producers: Leonard Hill; Robert O'Connor; Lloyd Shirley
- Producer: David Wickes
- Production locations: Iver, United Kingdom (studio); Belper, United Kingdom
- Cinematography: Alan Hume
- Editor: Keith Palmer
- Running time: 93–96 minutes
- Production companies: Euston Films for Thames; Hill-O'Connor Television; Lorimar-Telepictures

Original release
- Network: ITV (United Kingdom); CBS (United States)
- Release: 11 October – 18 October 1988

Jack the Ripper is a drama television miniseries produced for Thames Television and CBS based on the notorious Jack the Ripper murder spree in Victorian London. It was first broadcast on ITV.

The film was produced to coincide with the 100th anniversary of the Whitechapel murders, and was originally screened on British television in two 90-minute episodes, broadcast on consecutive evenings, in October 1988, to coincide with the dates of some of the original events, advertising itself in advance as a solution to the century-old mystery of the murderer's identity using newly discovered original evidence.

== Plot ==
London, autumn 1888. Chief Inspector Frederick Abberline of Scotland Yard is assigned by his superiors to investigate the murder and brutal mutilation of a prostitute in the East End of London. As the mutilated corpses of other "shilling whores" turn up in the same area, London's tabloid journalists – particularly Benjamin Bates of The Star – whip up a public frenzy. The killer is nicknamed "Jack the Ripper" after a letter bearing that name and supposedly from the killer, is forwarded to Scotland Yard. As the Ripper terrorises London, public outrage erupts throughout the country, and Police Commissioner Sir Charles Warren fears that a revolution is in the air in London's East End.

There is no shortage of suspects for Abberline and his partner, Sergeant George Godley. These suspects include the American actor Richard Mansfield (appearing in the play Strange Case of Dr Jekyll and Mr Hyde in London); police surgeon Dr Henry Llewellyn; socialist agitator George Lusk; Queen Victoria's clairvoyant Robert Lees; the Queen's grandson Prince Albert Victor; and Dr Theodore Dyke Acland, the son-in-law of Sir William Gull, Royal Surgeon to Queen Victoria and expert on diseases of the brain. The police and the authorities want the murders solved at any cost, but Abberline and Godley face huge obstacles as they search for the truth – and hindrance from their superiors when the killer is finally unmasked. In the end of the movie the killer is revealed to be Doctor William Gull the royal physician.

== Cast ==
- Michael Caine – Chief Inspector Frederick Abberline, an aging alcoholic whose quest to solve the murders gives him the strength to give up drinking
- Lewis Collins – Sergeant George Godley
- Armand Assante – Richard Mansfield, American Stage actor in the theatrical play Jekyll and Hyde.
- Ray McAnally – Sir William Gull, Physician-in-Ordinary to Queen Victoria
- Ken Bones – Robert James Lees, Queen Victoria's psychic medium
- Susan George – Catherine Eddowes, fourth victim of Jack the Ripper
- Jane Seymour – Emma Prentiss
- Harry Andrews – Coroner Wynne Baxter
- Lysette Anthony – Mary Jane Kelly, fifth and last victim of Jack the Ripper
- Gerald Sim – Dr. George Bagster Phillips
- Hugh Fraser – Commissioner of Police Sir Charles Warren
- Edward Judd – Chief Superintendent of Police Thomas Arnold
- George Sweeney – Coach driver John Netley
- Michael Gothard – George Lusk, Chairman of the Whitechapel Vigilance Committee, and a violent Marxist and power-hungry politician
- T. P. McKenna – T. P. O'Connor, Editor of The Star newspaper
- Jon Laurimore – Inspector John Spratling
- Peter Armitage – Sgt. Kerby
- Richard Morant – Dr. Theodore Dyke Acland, son-in-law of Sir William Gull
- Ronald Hines – Henry Matthews, Home Secretary
- David Swift – Lord Salisbury, Prime Minister
- Jonathan Moore – Benjamin Bates, reporter for the Star
- Michael Hughes – Dr. Rees Ralph Llewellyn, Chief Medical Examiner of Whitechapel
- Gary Shail – Billy White, a Whitechapel pimp
- Angela Crow– Elizabeth Stride, third victim of Jack the Ripper
- Marc Culwick – Prince Albert Victor
- David Ryall – Bowyer, Mary Kelly's landlord
- Gary Love – Derek, a young police officer
- Kelly Cryer – Annette, a French girl and friend of Mary Jane Kelly
- Roger Ashton-Griffiths – Rodman, a blind brothel operator in Whitechapel

== Background ==
Using historical characters involved in the genuine 1888 hunt for the killer, Jack the Ripper was written by Derek Marlowe and David Wickes and directed by Wickes. The series drew heavily on the same discredited Masonic/Royal Family conspiracy theory as the 1978 film Murder By Decree; it is also the account presented in the 2001 film From Hell. This theory was first put forward in the 1960s by Thomas E. A. Stowell who published his claims in a November 1970 issue of The Criminologist. The theory was later turned into the bestselling Jack the Ripper: The Final Solution (1976) by Stephen Knight. The 1988 series dispenses with the fictional Sherlock Holmes who uncovered the conspiracy in Murder By Decree and instead concentrates on the real-life Whitechapel detective Frederick Abberline, as assisted by Sergeant George Godley.

The series is constructed as a Whodunit in which viewers are led to suspect, at various points, that Prince Albert Victor, Richard Mansfield, George Lusk, Henry Llewellyn or Theodore Dyke Acland could be Jack the Ripper. Before Jack the Ripper was broadcast, director/co-writer David Wickes claimed that he had been allowed unprecedented access to the Scotland Yard files on the Ripper case and stated that his production would be revealing the 'true' identity of Jack the Ripper for the first time. After pressure from Ripperologist Melvin Harris and others, Wickes was forced to withdraw this claim. Nevertheless, the series begins with a disclaimer on behalf of the production staff, stating, "Our story is based on extensive research, including a review of the official files by special permission of the Home Office and interviews with leading criminologists and Scotland Yard officials." The series' "revelation" that Sir William Gull was Jack the Ripper was not new: Stephen Knight's 1976 book alleged that Gull was the Ripper, and prior to that, the theory had been cited in the 1973 BBC TV series Jack the Ripper (two episodes of which were directed by David Wickes). Furthermore, the Ripper character in the film Murder by Decree, assigned the fictitious name "Sir Thomas Spivey," was based on Sir William Gull.

Marlowe and Wickes retained The Final Solution's contention that William Gull was Jack the Ripper, but dispensed with most of the rest of the theory: the involvement of Prince Albert Victor is dismissed as a red herring; there is no mention of Walter Sickert, Annie Crook, an illegitimate Royal baby, blackmail or Freemasons (although there is a silent inference to this when Warren is shown the message written on the wall); and the explanation given for the murders is dementia, acquired by Gull from a stroke. The original script adhered more closely to The Final Solution but was changed during the course of production: interviewed in 2017, Jane Seymour stated "when we first got the script, they kind of implicated the Masons as being involved, and by the time we finished the movie, there was pretty much no mention of the Masons."

Jack the Ripper ends with the following disclaimer:

In the strange case of Jack the Ripper, there was no trial and no signed confession.

In 1888, neither fingerprinting nor bloodtyping was in use and no conclusive forensic, documentary or eye-witness testimony was available. Thus, positive proof of the Ripper’s identity is not available.

We have come to our conclusions after careful study and painstaking deduction. Other researchers, criminologists and writers may take a different view.

We believe our conclusions to be true.

== Production ==
The series was originally mounted on a relatively low-budget, with interior photography shot on video-tape and location footage shot on 16-mm film (as was common practice for British television productions of the time). Filming commenced in October 1987, with Barry Foster of Van der Valk cast in the role of Abberline. Production was halted in December 1987 after the American television network CBS became interested in the project, and most of the original cast and crew were paid off.

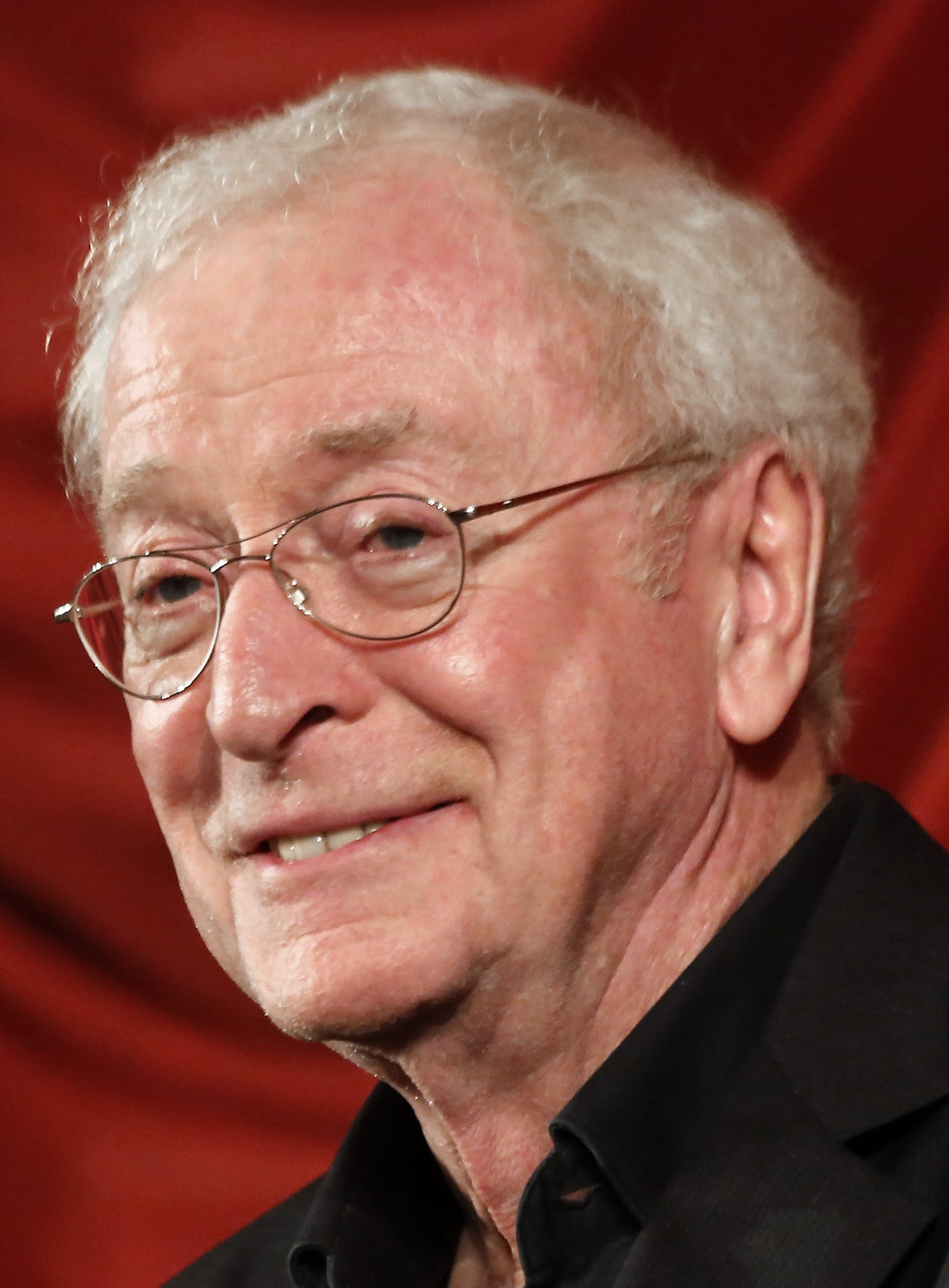
Michael Caine played Frederick Abberline

Jack the Ripper was consequently re-tooled as an Anglo-American co-production with an $11 million budget (provided jointly by Thames Television and CBS), shot entirely on film. It was decided that a more famous actor would be required to headline the series if it was to sell in the United States, so the role of Abberline was recast with Michael Caine – ironically, Foster had earlier replaced Caine in Alfred Hitchcock's Frenzy, when Caine refused to play a serial killer who mutilates women. The casting of Michael Caine was considered to be a major coup, as the actor was not known for doing television work. Jack the Ripper reportedly earned Caine a fee of $1 million.

This was Harry Andrews's last production. Armand Assante's stand-in died during filming. Of her experience filming Jack the Ripper, Jane Seymour said, "That was fun. I played it as a redhead, it was a great role, and of course I got to work with the great Michael Caine. I had been warned that Michael is tough on actors and actresses unless they know their lines and are very professional, which mostly I was, but they didn’t tell me that he literally liked to do one take and then go and have lunch with his wife. Which is basically what happened! So you’d show up, and unless the [microphone] landed on you or the camera bumped onto you or he messed up, which he never did, that was it. It was one take, and then you’re on to the next. So that was interesting." Michael Caine worked with Jack the Ripper director David Wickes on another television film: the four-hour, two-part Jekyll & Hyde (1990), based on the book by Robert Louis Stevenson. The story of Jekyll and Hyde is a plot-point in Wickes' Jack the Ripper series.

In the original version of the series, Abberline's partner George Godley was to have been played by Brian Capron. He was replaced by Lewis Collins who was best known as Bodie in the ITV action series The Professionals. American actor Armand Assante and British actress Jane Seymour, both well known to American audiences, were added to the cast at the suggestion of CBS. Ken Bones, George Sweeney, Edward Judd and Kelly Cryer all played the parts they were cast for in the unfinished version of the series.

Jack the Ripper began filming in February 1988, with principal photography at Pinewood Studios. David Wickes was determined that as few people as possible should know who would be unmasked as the killer, and shot four dummy endings (revealing George Lusk, Inspector Spratling, Chief Superintendent Arnold and Sir Charles Warren as the Ripper) to put the cast and crew off the scent. He also mocked up a scene with Godley pulling William Gull from a coach in a case of mistaken identity, and then edited them all together to produce the result. Reportedly, only eight members of Wickes' staff knew the truth before production wrapped.

The series premiered in the UK on 11 October 1988, and in the USA on 21 October 1988. (The original broadcast thus occurred within the timeframe of the centenary of the Ripper's "Canonical Five" murders, 31 August-9 November 1888.) The series enjoyed extremely high ratings on both sides of the Atlantic.

Several DVD editions of Jack the Ripper include, as extra features, audio commentary by director/co-writer David Wickes and production assistant Sue Davies, and twenty minutes of footage from the original shoot starring Barry Foster and Brian Capron. The series was released on Blu-ray on 27 March 2017. This edition features two versions of the series over two discs, the first presenting the series in two parts as originally broadcast and in its original 4:3 aspect. The second disc contains the series as one film and in a 16:9 widescreen aspect. The blu-ray release contains the same extras contained in the previous DVD releases.

British nostalgia television channel Talking Pictures TV aired both episodes on Wednesday 1 and Thursday 2 April 2020, the first time the miniseries was repeated on British television for some years.

== Awards and nominations ==
Year	Award	Category	Nominee(s)	Result	Ref.
1989	American Cinema Editors Awards	Best Edited Episode from a Television Mini-Series	Keith Palmer (for "Part II")	Nominated	
1989	Golden Globe Awards	Best Miniseries or Motion Picture Made for Television		Nominated	
1989	Golden Globe Awards	Best Actor in a Miniseries or Motion Picture Made for Television	Michael Caine	Won (Note: Tied with Stacy Keach for Hemingway.)	
1989	Golden Globe Awards	Best Supporting Actor in a Series, Miniseries or Motion Picture Made for Television	Armand Assante	Nominated	
1989	Primetime Emmy Awards	Outstanding Supporting Actor in a Miniseries or a Special	Armand Assante	Nominated	
1989	Primetime Emmy Awards	Outstanding Individual Achievement in Hairstyling for a Miniseries or a Special	Betty Glasow, Stevie Hall, and Elaine Bowerbank (for "Part I")	Won	

== See also ==
- Murder by Decree
- From Hell (film)
