= Theodore Dyke Acland =

English medical doctor, surgeon and author (1851-1931)

Theodore Dyke Acland FRCP FRCS
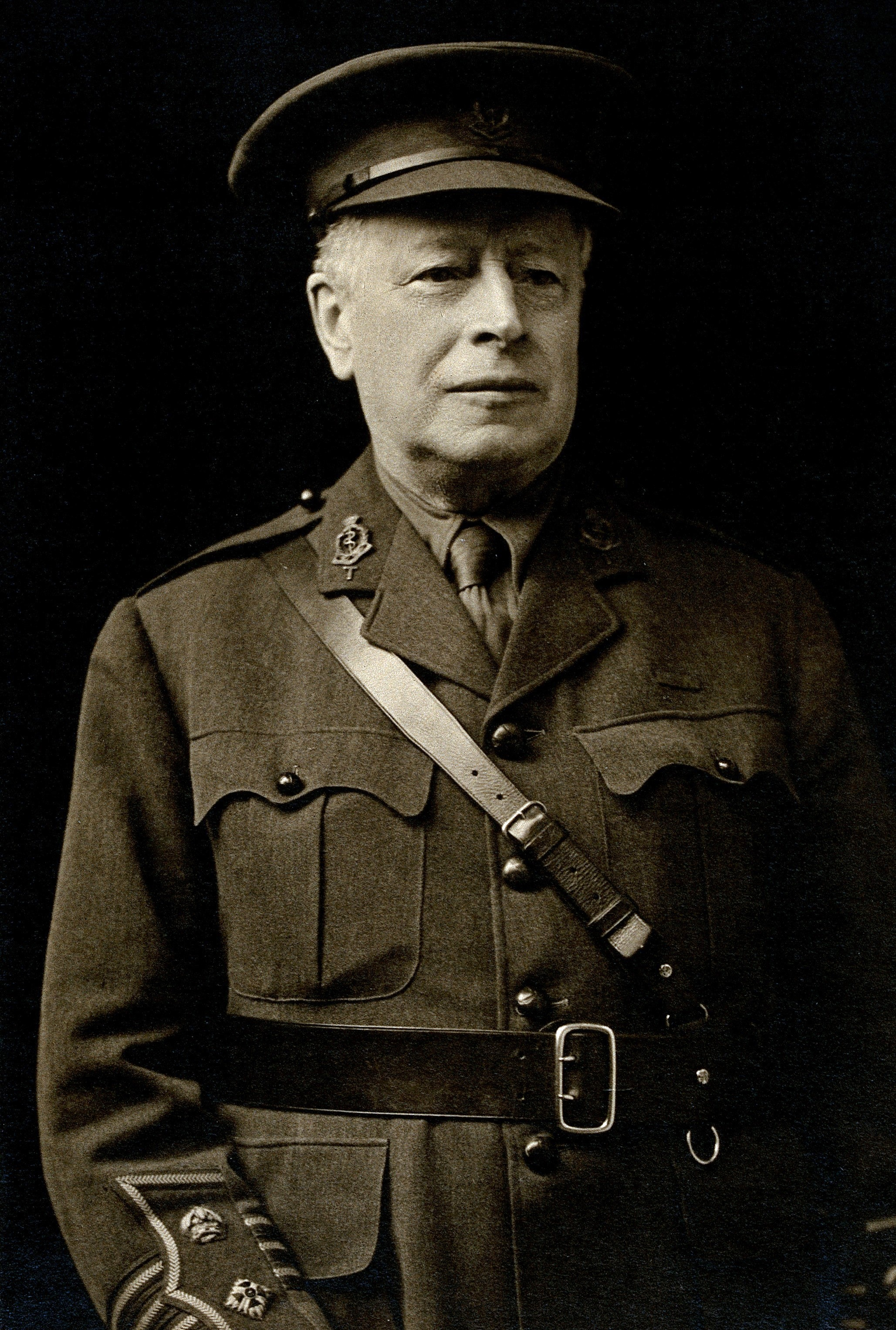
- Born: 14 November 1851; Killerton, Devon, England
- Died: 16 April 1931 (aged 79); London, England
- Education: University of Oxford (MD)
- Spouse: Caroline Cameron Gull (m. 1888; died 1929)
- Children: 2, including Theodore
- Parents: Sir Henry Acland; Sarah Cotton
- Scientific career
- Fields: Medicine
- Workplaces: St Thomas's Hospital, London

Theodore Dyke Acland (14 November 1851 – 16 April 1931) was an English medical doctor, surgeon and author and was the son-in-law of Sir William Gull, a leading London medical practitioner and one of the Physicians-in-Ordinary to Queen Victoria. For many years Acland was the Medical Adviser to the government of the Sudan.

== Early years ==
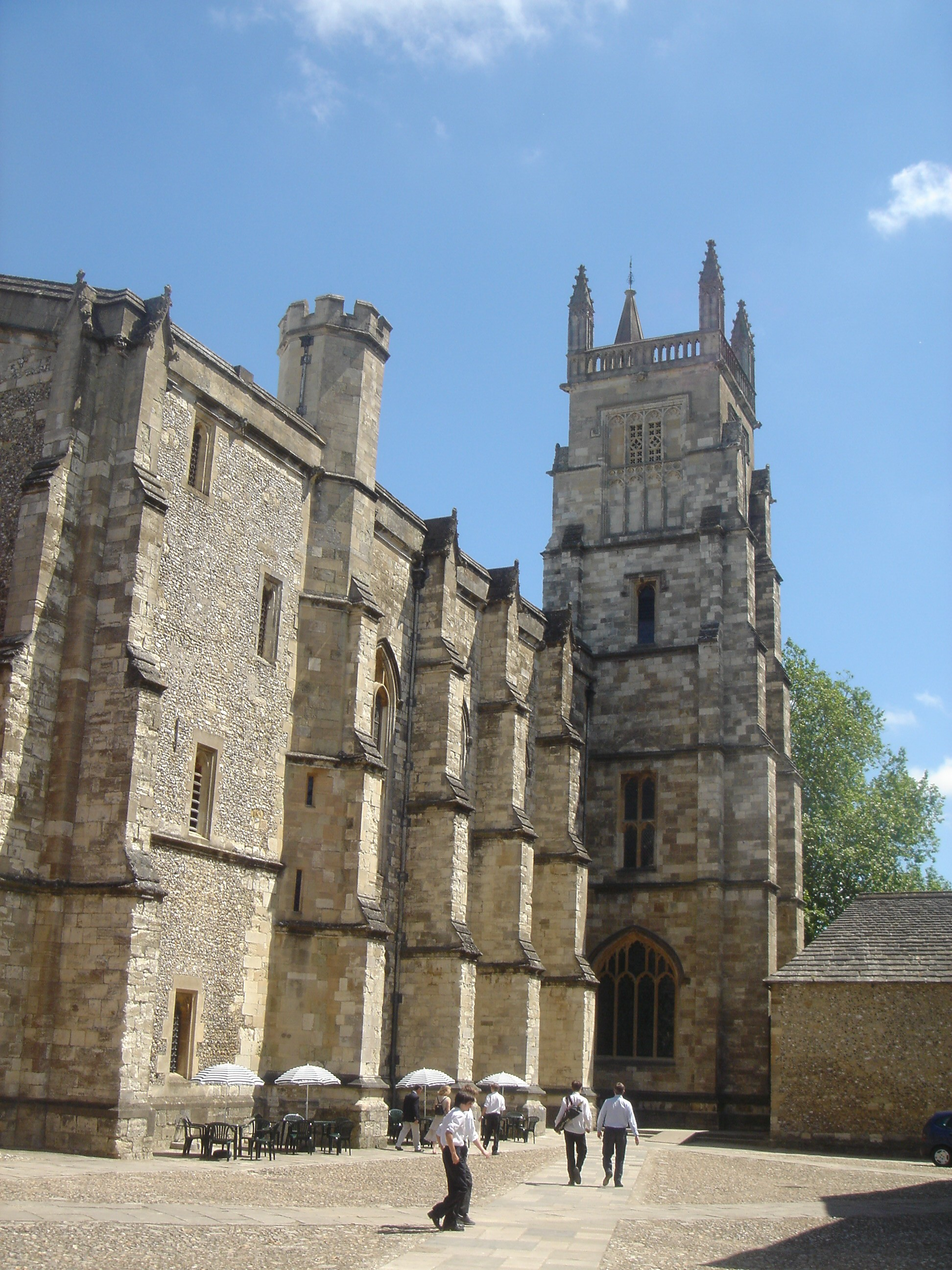
Winchester College

Theodore Dyke Acland was born on 14 November 1851 in Killerton, Devon, England. He was the third son of Sir Henry Wentworth Acland, 1st Baronet, and Sarah Cotton, and the grandson of Sir Thomas Dyke Acland, 10th Baronet.

Acland was educated at Winchester College and Christ Church, the University of Oxford, as well as the University of Leipzig, the University of Berlin and St. Thomas' Hospital.

He graduated from Oxford University with the degree of Master of Arts (MA).

== Medical career ==
Acland graduated from Oxford University with the degree of Doctor of Medicine (MD) in 1883. He was registered as a Licentiate (LRCP) of the Royal College of Physicians in London. In 1883, he was sent by the Foreign Office to deal with an outbreak of cholera in Egypt. He was then selected for service with the Egyptian Army, of which he became the Principal Medical Officer, and was awarded the Order of the Medjidie for his services. He was registered as a Member of the Royal College of Surgeons (MRCS) and later as a Fellow (FRCS). He gained the rank of Brevet Lieutenant Colonel in the Royal Army Medical Corps (Territorial Army). He was elected a Fellow of the Royal College of Physicians (FRCP) in 1889. In 1893 he was appointed physician to St Thomas' Hospital, London; he later was appointed a Consulting Physician and Governor of St Thomas' and the Royal Brompton Hospital, and was a Consultant to the Commercial Union Assurance Company, as well as numerous other boards, councils and advisory positions.

In 1900 Acland was appointed Medical Adviser to Reginald Wingate, the Sirdar and Governor-General of the Sudan and was asked to select medical personnel for the Sudanese Government. During World War I he served as consulting physician to the London district. In August 1931 Acland was posthumously awarded the Order of the Nile (2nd class) for his services to the Sudan Government.

His publications included The Future of the Tuberculous Soldier and A Collection of the Published Writings of William Withey Gull published by the New Sydenham Society (1894).

== Personal life ==
Acland married Caroline Cameron Gull (1855–1929), the daughter of Sir William Withey Gull and Susan Anne Lacy, on 12 April 1888. They had two children: Aimee Sarah Agnes Dyke Acland was born on 14 May 1889 and died in infancy later that year; and Theodore William Gull Acland was born on 7 November 1890. The family resided in Bryanston Square, London W1, England.

Acland was a governor of Gresham's School, where he sent his son.

== Death ==
Acland died on 16 April 1931 aged 79. His papers were donated to the Wellcome Library.

== Jack the Ripper ==
Acland became posthumously involved in the Jack the Ripper Royal conspiracy theory when Thomas E. A. Stowell suggested in a 1970 article in The Criminologist that Sir William Gull, the Royal doctor, attempted to certify Prince Albert Victor, Duke of Clarence and Avondale, as the Ripper. Stowell claimed that his main source was Gull's daughter Caroline, Acland's wife. Having studied under Acland Stowell referred to him as "one time my beloved Chief". Stowell was an executor of Acland's will.

Stephen Knight, in his 1976 book Jack the Ripper: The Final Solution went even further, claiming that Jack the Ripper was actually a three-man team, with Gull as the actual killer. Knight alleged that Gull was a Freemason and the killings were carried out according to Masonic ritual. Knight claims that Gull afterwards became insane and was certified in an asylum under the name "Thomas Mason" and a sham funeral service carried out in the pretence that he had died. Cited as evidence in support of the theory is the fact that Acland signed his father-in-law's death certificate. While Acland's actions were unusual and were not encouraged, they were not illegal.

Following Stowell's article, Colin Wilson disclosed that ten years before it was published, Stowell invited him to lunch at his club and tried to convince him that they were thinking along the same lines on the Ripper mystery. He told him, "Jack the Ripper was the Duke of Clarence." Later, Wilson said that he contacted Stowell to ask him if he might mention the theory in some articles that he was about to write and although Stowell refused, saying "Her Majesty might not approve", Wilson had the distinct impression that Stowell hoped that he would mention it. He said, "He (Stowell) had been sitting on this thing for 30 years and would have welcomed the chance to test public reaction."

In the 1988 mini-series Jack the Ripper, Acland was played by Richard Morant.
