= John Netley =

English cab driver, Jack the Ripper suspect

John Charles Netley

John Charles Netley (19 May 1860 – 20 September 1903) was an English cab driver who was later claimed to have been involved in the 'Whitechapel Murders' committed by the unidentified serial killer Jack the Ripper.

== Biography ==
Netley was born in Paddington in London, the second eldest of nine children; his twin brother William Henry Netley died in infancy. His father John Netley (1832–1912) was an omnibus conductor, and his mother was Mary Ann (née Terry) (1833–1886). From 1868, he attended Saint Matthew's National School in Westminster.

At time of death, John Netley was described as a "carman" (i.e. a goods wagon driver) in the census returns for the period which show him living with his father. He was employed by Messrs Thompson, McKay and Co., who described Netley as "very steady". Netley died, aged 43, in an accident when the wheel of his van hit an obelisk in London's Park Road, where it joins onto Baker Street, near to Clarence Gate in Regent's Park. He was thrown from his van under the hooves of the horses where his head was crushed by a wheel. The jury at his inquest returned a verdict of accidental death, with a recommendation that the drivers of vans should be offered safety straps.

== Whitechapel allegations ==
In 1888, John Netley was a Hackney carriage driver in London. In 1976, author Stephen Knight accused Netley of complicity in the Whitechapel murders in his book Jack the Ripper: The Final Solution.

Knight's theory originated from the story of Joseph Sickert, who claimed to be the illegitimate son of Walter Sickert, another 'Ripper' suspect. He related that after the killings had concluded, Netley was heavily involved in attempts on the life of the young Alice Crook (supposedly the illegitimate daughter of Annie Crook and Prince Albert Victor, Duke of Clarence and Avondale, the grandson of Queen Victoria), trying to run her down with his carriage.

Joseph Sickert claimed that he drowned after the attempt, having run to Westminster where he jumped off the pier. Sickert was wrong in this and therefore could not have based his story on any contemporary evidence, as has often been suggested. A newspaper report was found of a man who gave his name as "Nickley" being rescued from the river by the pier master, and later discharging himself from hospital. Nickley could have been a misheard Netley - or a quickly assumed name. Stephen Knight said that the Dictionary of British Surnames did not list Nickley.

=== Portrayals in fiction ===
Netley has been featured in several works based on the Jack the Ripper and the Royal Family conspiracy theory. In the film Murder by Decree (1979), Netley was renamed William Slade, and played by actor Peter Jonfield. In the made-for-TV film Jack the Ripper (1988), starring Michael Caine, Netley was played by actor George Sweeney. Netley was again portrayed as Gull's accomplice in the graphic novel From Hell. This version depicts Netley as semi-literate, and horrified by Gull's plans.

In the film adaptation of From Hell (2001), starring Johnny Depp, Netley was played by Jason Flemyng. Netley was featured in an episode of Sir Arthur Conan Doyle's The Lost World called "The Knife" that portrayed the Ripper murders as the collaborated work of Netley, Sir William Gull and a police inspector, Robert Anderson.
