= Jack the Ripper: The Final Solution =

1976 true crime book by Stephen Knight

- Cover of UK edition
- Author: Stephen Knight
- Language: English
- Subject: Jack the Ripper
- Publisher: George G. Harrap & Co Ltd, London (UK); McKay, New York (US)
- Publication date: 1976
- Media type: Print (hardcover)
- Pages: 284
- ISBN: 0-245-52724-9 (UK); ISBN 0-679-50711-6 (US)
- OCLC: 2646848

Jack the Ripper: The Final Solution is a book written by Stephen Knight first published in 1976. It proposed a solution to five murders in Victorian London that were blamed on an unidentified serial killer known as "Jack the Ripper".

Knight presented an elaborate conspiracy theory involving the British royal family, freemasonry and the painter Walter Sickert. He concluded that the victims were murdered to cover up a secret marriage between the second-in-line to the throne, Prince Albert Victor, Duke of Clarence and Avondale, and working class girl Annie Elizabeth Crook, and that the killer was physician William Gull, aided by coachman John Netley. There are many facts that contradict Knight's theory, and his main source, Joseph Gorman (also known as Joseph Sickert), later retracted the story and admitted to the press that it was a hoax.

Most scholars dismiss the theory, and the book's conclusion is now widely discredited. Nevertheless, the book was popular and commercially successful, going through 20 editions. It was the basis for the graphic novel From Hell and its film adaptation, as well as other dramatisations, and has influenced crime fiction writers, such as Patricia Cornwell and Anne Perry.

== Origins ==
Between August and November 1888, at least five brutal murders were committed in the Whitechapel district of London. Although Whitechapel was an impoverished area and violence there was common, these murders can be linked to the same killer through a distinctive modus operandi. All the murders took place within the distance of a few streets, late at night or in the early morning, and the victims were all women whose throats were cut. In four of the cases, their bodies were mutilated, or even eviscerated. The removal of internal organs from three of the victims led to contemporary proposals that "considerable anatomical knowledge was displayed by the murderer, which would seem to indicate that his occupation was that of a butcher or a surgeon." Media organisations and the police received many letters and postcards purportedly written by the killer, who was dubbed "Jack the Ripper" after one of the signatories. Most of the anonymous confessional letters were dismissed by the police as hoaxes but one, known as the "From Hell" letter after a phrase used by the writer, was treated more seriously; it was sent with a small box containing half of a preserved human kidney. It is not clear, however, whether the kidney truly came from one of the victims or was a medical specimen sent as part of a macabre joke.

Despite an extensive police investigation, the killer was never found and his identity is still a mystery. Both at the time and subsequently, many amateur and professional investigators have proposed solutions but no single theory is widely accepted.

=== Claims of Thomas Stowell ===
In 1970, British surgeon Thomas E. A. Stowell published an article entitled "Jack the Ripper – A Solution?" in the November issue of The Criminologist. In the article, Stowell proposed that the Ripper was an aristocrat who had contracted syphilis during a visit to the West Indies, that it had driven him insane, and that in this state of mind he had perpetrated the five canonical Jack the Ripper murders. Although Stowell did not directly name his suspect in the article, he described in detail the suspect's family and his physical appearance and nicknames, all of which pointed to Queen Victoria's grandson, Prince Albert Victor, Duke of Clarence and Avondale. Stowell wrote that following a double murder on 30 September 1888, his suspect was restrained by his own family in an institution in the south of England, but later escaped to commit a final murder on 9 November before ultimately dying of syphilis. To back up his theory, Stowell drew comparisons between the evisceration of the women and the disembowelment of deer shot by the aristocracy on their estates. Stowell said his information came from the private notes of Sir William Gull, a reputable physician who had treated members of the royal family. Stowell knew Gull's son-in-law, Theodore Dyke Acland, and was an executor of Acland's estate.

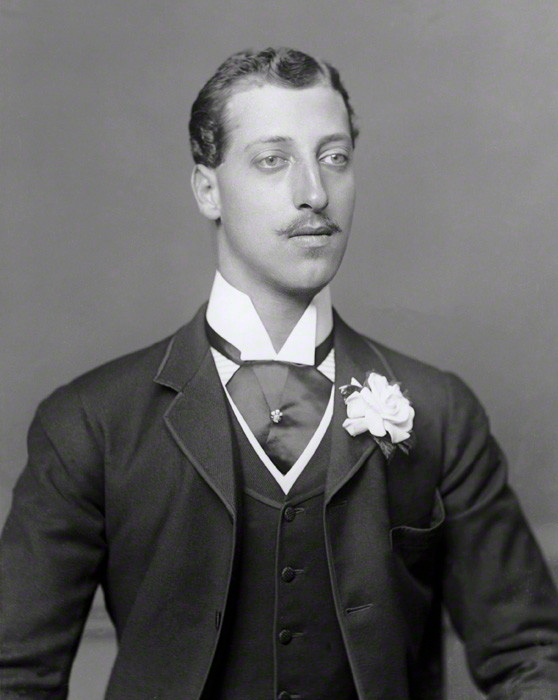
Prince Albert Victor, Duke of Clarence and Avondale, c. 1888

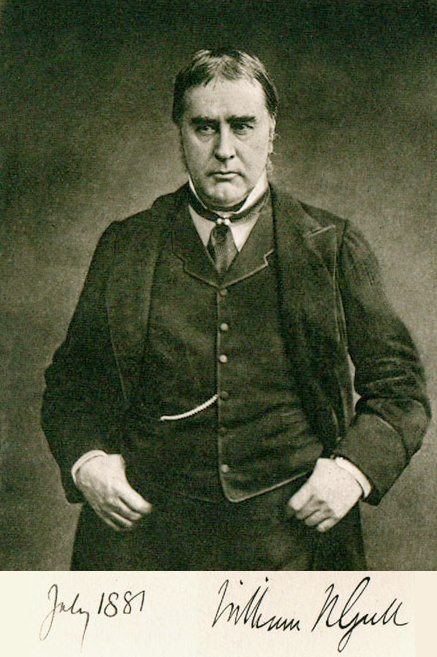
Sir William Gull was a notable physician who retired through ill health in 1887.

Stowell's article attracted intense attention, and placed Albert Victor among the most notable Ripper suspects, but his innocence was soon proven. Gull died before Albert Victor, and so could not have known about Albert Victor's death. All three doctors who were attending Albert Victor at his death in 1892 concurred that he had died of pneumonia, and given the timescale of syphilitic disease progression, it is highly improbable that Albert Victor had syphilis. The first symptoms of mental illness that arise from syphilitic infection tend to occur about 15 years from first exposure. While the timescale of disease progression is never absolute, for Albert Victor to have suffered from syphilitic insanity in 1888, he would probably have to have been infected at the age of nine in about 1873, six years before he visited the West Indies. Stowell claimed that his suspect had been incarcerated in a mental institution, when Albert Victor was serving in the British army, making regular public appearances, and visiting friends at country houses. Newspaper reports, Queen Victoria's diary, family letters, and official documents prove that Albert Victor was attending functions in public, or meeting foreign royalty, or hundreds of miles from London at the time of each of the five canonical murders. (Note: For example, on 30 September 1888, when Elizabeth Stride and Catherine Eddowes were killed in the early morning, Albert Victor was at Balmoral, the royal retreat in Scotland, over 500 miles (over 800 km) from London.)

On 5 November 1970, Stowell wrote to The Times denying that it was his intention to imply Prince Albert Victor was Jack the Ripper. The letter was published on 9 November, the day after the elderly Stowell's own death from natural causes. The same week, Stowell's son reported that he had burned his father's papers, saying "I read just sufficient to make certain that there was nothing of importance."

=== Claims of Joseph Gorman ===
Though Stowell's hypothesis was incorrect, his article rekindled interest in the Jack the Ripper case, and in 1973 the BBC launched a television series, Jack the Ripper, which investigated the Whitechapel murders. The series mixed documentary and drama; it featured real evidence but was hosted by fictional detectives Barlow and Watt, played by Stratford Johns and Frank Windsor, respectively. The series was made into a book, The Ripper File, by Elwyn Jones and John Lloyd in 1975. The sixth and final programme included a testimony by Joseph Gorman, who called himself Joseph Sickert and claimed to be the illegitimate son of noted painter Walter Sickert. Gorman claimed that Sickert had told him a story that implicated not only the royal family but also a host of other famous people in the murders. According to Gorman, Gull committed the murders with the help of accomplices. Stowell had mentioned rumours implicating Gull in his article, but had dismissed them as unfair and false.

Gorman said that his Catholic grandmother had secretly married Albert Victor, and that his mother, as the legitimate daughter of Albert Victor, was the rightful heir to the throne. He claimed that the Ripper murders were staged as part of a conspiracy to hush up any potential scandal by murdering anyone who knew of the birth. In the original television series, the story is depicted as the belief of Gorman but not of the detectives. Captivated by Gorman's story, journalist Stephen Knight decided to investigate the claims further, and eventually published his research as the book Jack the Ripper: The Final Solution in 1976.

== Content ==
=== Gorman's story ===
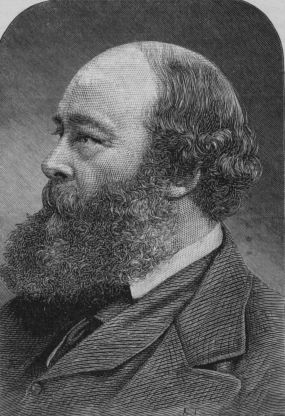
Lord Salisbury was Prime Minister at the time of the murders.

The book begins with Knight explaining how he came to meet Joseph Gorman, and then he tells Gorman's story which "did not come in clear, precise, chronological order but I had to glean it from rambling and sometimes vague discussion". Gorman says that Albert Victor's mother, Princess Alexandra, introduced Walter Sickert to her son in the hope that Sickert would teach Albert Victor about art. Gorman claims that Albert Victor met one of Sickert's models, Annie Elizabeth Crook, a Catholic shop girl, at Sickert's studio at 15 Cleveland Street, London. They had an affair, he says, and married in a secret ceremony with Sickert and Annie's friend, Mary Jane Kelly, acting as witnesses. Gorman alleges that Albert Victor and Annie's daughter, Alice Margaret Crook, was born on 18 April 1885, and that Albert Victor settled Annie and Alice into an apartment in Cleveland Street. In April 1888, Gorman continues, Queen Victoria and the British Prime Minister Lord Salisbury discovered Albert Victor's secret. Gorman accuses Salisbury of ordering a raid on the apartment because he was afraid that public knowledge of a potential Catholic heir to the throne would result in a revolution. Gorman claims that Albert Victor was placed in the custody of his family, while Annie was placed in the custody of Sir William Gull, who certified her insane; she spent the next 30 years drifting in and out of institutions before dying in 1920.

Meanwhile, Gorman alleges, Kelly was looking after the daughter, Alice, both during and after the raid. Gorman asserts that at first Kelly was content to hide the child, but then she, along with her friends Mary Ann Nichols, Annie Chapman and Elizabeth Stride, decided to blackmail the government. Gorman accuses Salisbury of conspiring with his fellow freemasons, including senior policemen in the London Metropolitan Police, to stop the scandal by staging the murders of the women. Gorman says Salisbury assigned the task to Gull, who lured the four women into a carriage individually where Gull murdered them with the assistance of coachman John Netley and Sir Robert Anderson, Assistant Commissioner of Scotland Yard. Gorman claims a fifth victim, Catherine Eddowes, was killed accidentally in a case of mistaken identity because she used the alias Mary Ann Kelly and was confused with Mary Jane Kelly. Gorman alleges that Netley tried to kill the young Alice twice but after the second unsuccessful attempt several witnesses chased Netley, who threw himself into the Thames and drowned. Gorman completes the story by saying that Alice lived well into old age, later becoming Walter Sickert's mistress, and that Alice and Walter Sickert are his parents.

=== Knight's investigation ===
Knight explains that at first he did not believe Gorman's sensational story, which seemed "arrant, if entertaining, nonsense", but was so entranced by it that he had to investigate further. In describing the progress of his investigation, Knight reveals a series of coincidences: both Albert Victor's mother and Alice Crook were deaf; both Albert Victor's mother and Walter Sickert were Danish; Sickert is obsessed by the Ripper; the murders ended with the death of Mary Kelly; there was growing republican sentiment at the time of the murders, as well as anti-Catholic prejudice; a woman named "Elizabeth Cook", who Knight claims could be Annie Elizabeth Crook misspelt, did live at 6 Cleveland Street; Annie Crook was institutionalised; rumours of the time link Prince Albert Victor to a scandal in Cleveland Street; Gull was fond of grapes, and one of the victims may have been eating some at the time of her death; Gull matches the description of an unnamed physician accused by clairvoyant Robert James Lees, who claimed to have identified the Ripper by using psychic powers.

Eventually, as the circumstantial coincidences build up, Knight becomes convinced that Gorman's story is true. The lack of tangible evidence, he claims, is due to a government cover-up and deliberate misdirection of the police investigation. To back up the claims of a masonic conspiracy, he notes supposed similarities between the Jack the Ripper killings and alleged masonic ritual murders, and accuses Sir Charles Warren, Commissioner of Police, of destroying evidence to protect his freemason cronies. (Note: When graffiti mentioning "Juwes" was found near the site of one of the murders, Warren ordered it washed away before it could be photographed. He later said he feared anti-Semitic riots if the words were reported. Knight claims that "Juwes" is not a misspelling of "Jews" but is a reference to "three apprentice Masons ... who are the basis of Masonic ritual".) Knight points out that Stowell, who was apparently the first person to suggest Albert Victor's and Gull's involvement in the murders, was a freemason.

== Critical reception ==
Reviewers at the time of first publication met the book with undisguised scepticism and satire, but felt that Knight presented his unlikely case with ingenuity. Quentin Bell wrote in The Times Literary Supplement: "[The book] begins bravely and fairly by presenting the greater part of the author's case and admitting at once that 'it all sounds terribly unlikely'. It does." Medical History stated: "Despite the author's ingenuity the case does not stand up to careful and critical analysis and is no more 'final' than its many predecessors." Since then, scholars from multiple disciplines have rejected Gorman's story as a ridiculous fantasy, and highlight many facts which contradict the version of events presented by Knight.

Annie Crook was a real person and did have a daughter, Alice, born on 18 April 1885 at St Marylebone Workhouse, and Joseph Gorman was Alice's son. However, there is no evidence in support of Gorman's claim that his father was Walter Sickert. Gorman was one of five children born within the marriage of Alice Margaret Crook and William Gorman. Furthermore, according to author Trevor Marriott, Alice "must have been conceived between 18 July and 11 August 1884". Albert Victor was in Heidelberg from June to August 1884; hence, he was not in London at the time of Alice's conception and could not have been her father. The name of Alice's father was left blank on her birth certificate, but in adulthood, Alice claimed her father was William Crook. William Crook was also the name of her grandfather. Ripper expert Don Rumbelow has suggested that the name of Alice's father was omitted from her birth certificate either because she was illegitimate or to conceal an incestuous relationship between her mother, Annie, and grandfather, William. There is no record of any marriage between Albert Victor and Annie Crook; even if such a marriage had taken place, it would have been invalid under British law due to the Royal Marriages Act 1772, which voids any marriage contracted by a member of the royal family without the consent of the Sovereign. Any child of an invalid marriage is deemed illegitimate and excluded from the line of succession. Gorman claimed that his grandmother was Catholic, although records prove this to be untrue. If she had been and if she had married Albert Victor, he and their child would be excluded from inheriting the throne under the Act of Settlement 1701, which excluded Catholics and Protestants who married Catholics from the line of succession.

There are further problems with Gorman's version of events. An apartment at 6 Cleveland Street could not have been raided in April 1888, since by that time Nos. 4–14 Cleveland Street had been demolished, and the house no longer existed. Annie and Alice were not supported by a wealthy patron, such as Albert Victor, but were paupers who occasionally lived in workhouses. Annie was not institutionalised for insanity but because of recurrent epilepsy. The Ripper victims were not known to be acquainted with each other or Annie Crook, who lived on the other side of Central London. Even if they had known her or her child, it is unlikely that their tale of royal illegitimacy would be believed, so any attempt by them to reveal the supposed scandal would merely have been dismissed. Gull retired from practice in 1887 after suffering a stroke, which left him temporarily partially paralysed and unable to speak. Gull did recover, but he suffered further attacks before his death in 1890. Furthermore, neither Lord Salisbury, nor Sir James Anderson, nor Sir William Gull were freemasons, and there is no documentary evidence linking Netley to the other suspects, nor did he drown in the Thames. He was actually killed in 1903 after falling under the wheels of his own van. The forensic evidence indicates that the bodies of the victims were not moved, and so were not dissected in a carriage and then moved to where they were discovered. Some of the streets where the victims were found were too narrow for a carriage. Sickert did not have a studio in Cleveland Street, and there is no proof that he knew the Princess of Wales. Anderson was in Switzerland at the time of the double murder, and so was not one of the perpetrators.

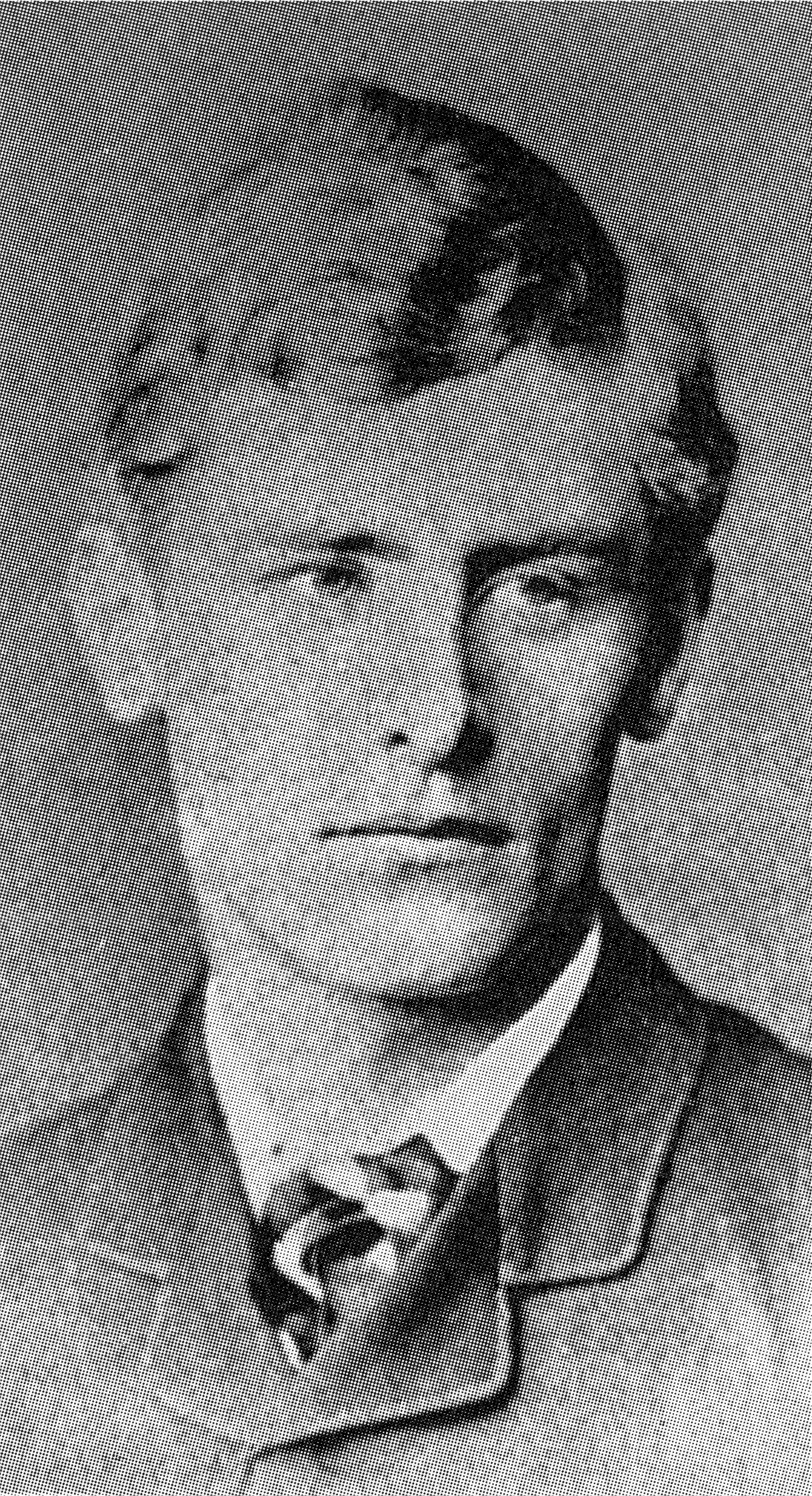
Walter Sickert, c. 1884

Knight appreciated that there were problems with Gorman's claims, but he "either misinterpreted, or deliberately ignored" them. Knight admitted that parts of Gorman's story were wrong but claimed that such mistakes were "stronger support of the fact that he was telling the truth". Realising that Anderson's absence in Switzerland meant that Anderson could not have been an accomplice, Knight considered Walter Sickert a much more likely culprit than Anderson, and suggested that he was the "third man" to participate in the crimes. This was not the first accusation made against Sickert. He had been previously mentioned as a potential suspect in Donald McCormick's 1959 book The Identity of Jack the Ripper. However, Sickert was in France with his mother and brother in the late summer of 1888, and is unlikely even to have been in London at the time of at least four of the murders. After Knight implicated Sickert, Joseph Gorman withdrew his testimony, admitting to The Sunday Times newspaper that "it was a hoax ... a whopping fib".

Knight's friend and fellow Ripper aficionado Colin Wilson thought the story was "obvious nonsense" but shortly after Knight's early death from a brain tumour he wrote in his defence: "he wrote the book with his tongue in his cheek, then found himself caught up in a success that prevented him from retracting or quietly disowning it."

== Influence ==
Despite its many inconsistencies, Knight's and Gorman's conspiracy theory has captured the imagination of other authors, who have made further modifications to the story. For example, Melvyn Fairclough's The Ripper and the Royals (London: Duckworth, 1991) asserted that Lord Randolph Churchill was the "third man", although Fairclough later disowned his own book and told reporters that "he no longer believes the theory". Andy Parlour, Sue Parlour and Kevin O'Donnell, authors of The Jack the Ripper Whitechapel Murders (St. Osyth, Essex: Ten Bells Publishing, 1997), supposed that Mary Jane Kelly was pregnant with Albert Victor's child instead of Annie Crook. These, and other books which promote Sickert from a knowing accomplice to being Jack the Ripper himself, such as Jean Overton-Fuller's Sickert and the Ripper Crimes (Oxford: Mandrake, 1990) and Patricia Cornwell's Portrait of a Killer (2002), are marketed as non-fiction books, but they are dismissed almost universally as derivative fantasies based on Knight's initial flawed analysis.

The conspiracy theory outlined in Jack the Ripper: The Final Solution is fictionalised in two plays: Doug Lucie's Force and Hypocrisy (1986) and Sherlock Holmes and the Ripper Murders by Brian Clemens. Four films have used elements of the theory: Murder by Decree, Jack the Ripper, The Ripper and the Hughes Brothers' From Hell, which was based on a graphic novel of the same name by Alan Moore and artist Eddie Campbell.

Knight's theory features in the final book of Philip José Farmer's Riverworld series, Gods of Riverworld, and novels utilising Knight's book as a base include Robin Paige's Death at Whitechapel (New York: Berkley Publishing Group, 2000) and Anne Perry's The Whitechapel Conspiracy (London: Headline, 2001).

== See also ==
- Jack the Ripper in fiction
- Jack the Ripper suspects
- Jack the Ripper's Bedroom, one of Sickert's paintings

== Sources ==
- Aronson, Theo (1994). Prince Eddy and the Homosexual Underworld. London: John Murray. ISBN 0-7195-5278-8.
- Begg, Paul (2003). Jack the Ripper: The Definitive History. Harlow, Essex: Pearson Education. ISBN 0-582-50631-X.
- Cook, Andrew (2006). Prince Eddy: The King Britain Never Had. Stroud, Gloucestershire: Tempus Publishing Ltd. ISBN 0-7524-3410-1.
- Cornwell, Patricia (2003). Portrait of a Killer: Jack the Ripper Case Closed. London: Time Warner Paperbacks. ISBN 0-7515-3359-9.
- Evans, Stewart P.; Skinner, Keith (2000). The Ultimate Jack the Ripper Companion: An Illustrated Encyclopedia. New York: Carroll & Graf. ISBN 0-7867-0768-2.
- Fairclough, Melvyn (1991). The Ripper and the Royals. London: Duckworth. ISBN 0-7156-2362-1.
- Fido, Martin (1987). The Crimes, Detection and Death of Jack the Ripper. London: Weidenfeld & Nicolson. ISBN 0-297-79136-2.
- Harrison, Michael (1972). Clarence: The life of H.R.H. the Duke of Clarence and Avondale (1864–1892). London and New York: W. H. Allen. ISBN 0-491-00722-1.
- Hyde, H. Montgomery (1976). The Cleveland Street Scandal. London: W. H. Allen. ISBN 0-491-01995-5.
- Knight, Stephen (1976; rev. 1984; repr. 2000). Jack the Ripper: The Final Solution. London: Bounty Books. ISBN 0-7537-0369-6.
- Marriott, Trevor (2005). Jack the Ripper: The 21st Century Investigation. London: John Blake. ISBN 1-84454-103-7.
- Meikle, Denis (2002). Jack the Ripper: The Murders and the Movies. Richmond, Surrey: Reynolds and Hearn Ltd. ISBN 1-903111-32-3.
- Ridley, Jasper (2008) [1999]. A Brief History of the Freemasons. London: Robinson. ISBN 978-1-84529-678-0.
- Roland, Paul (2006). The Crimes of Jack the Ripper. London: Arcturus Publishing. ISBN 978-0-572-03285-2.
- Rumbelow, Donald (2004). The Complete Jack the Ripper: Fully Revised and Updated. London: Penguin Books. ISBN 0-14-017395-1.
- Trow, M. J. (1997). The Many Faces of Jack the Ripper. Chichester, West Sussex: Summersdale. ISBN 1-84024-016-4.
- Wilson, Colin; Odell, Robin; edited by Gaute, J. H. H. (1987). Jack the Ripper: Summing up and Verdict. London and New York: Bantam Press. ISBN 0-593-01020-5.
