= From Hell (film) =

2001 film by Albert Hughes and Allen Hughes

- Theatrical release poster
- Directed by: The Hughes Brothers
- Screenplay by: Terry Hayes; Rafael Yglesias
- Based on: From Hell by Alan Moore; Eddie Campbell
- Produced by: Don Murphy; Jane Hamsher
- Starring: Johnny Depp; Heather Graham; Ian Holm; Robbie Coltrane; Ian Richardson; Jason Flemyng
- Cinematography: Peter Deming
- Edited by: George Bowers; Dan Lebental
- Music by: Trevor Jones
- Production company: Underworld Pictures
- Distributed by: 20th Century Fox
- Release date: October 19, 2001
- Running time: 122 minutes
- Countries: United States; United Kingdom; Czech Republic
- Language: English
- Budget: $35 million
- Box office: $74.6 million

From Hell is a 2001 historical slasher film directed by the Hughes Brothers and written by Terry Hayes and Rafael Yglesias. It is loosely based on the graphic novel From Hell by Alan Moore and Eddie Campbell about the Jack the Ripper murders. The film stars Johnny Depp as Frederick Abberline, the lead investigator of the murders, and Heather Graham as Mary Kelly, a prostitute targeted by the Ripper. Other cast members include Ian Holm, Robbie Coltrane, Ian Richardson and Jason Flemyng. It was an international co-production between the United Kingdom, the United States and Czech Republic. From Hell was theatrically released in the United States on October 19, 2001, by 20th Century Fox, to mixed reviews. It grossed over $74 million worldwide.

== Plot ==
In 1888, Mary Kelly and a small group of London prostitutes trudge through unrelenting daily misery. Their friend Ann Crook is a former prostitute now married to a wealthy painter named Albert, and she has recently given birth to a daughter, Alice. When Ann is kidnapped, the women are drawn into a conspiracy with links to high society. Ann's kidnapping is followed by the gruesome murder of another one of the women, and it soon becomes apparent that each of the prostitutes are being hunted, murdered and mutilated post-mortem by a killer called Jack the Ripper.

The prostitute murders grab the attention of Whitechapel police inspector Frederick Abberline, a brilliant yet troubled man whose police work is often aided by his psychic "visions". Abberline is still grieving the death of his wife during childbirth two years earlier. His colleague Sergeant Peter Godley tries to grasp Abberline's strange theories. Abberline's investigations reveal that an educated person, likely knowledgeable in human anatomy, is responsible for the murders because of the highly precise, surgical methods used.

Ann is soon located in a workhouse after being lobotomized because doctors deemed her violent and insane. It is implied that the operation was performed in order to silence her.

Abberline consults Sir William Gull, a physician to the royal family, drawing on his experience and knowledge of medicine. During this meeting, Gull deduces that Abberline is struggling with opium addiction. Gull's findings point Abberline to a darker, more organized conspiracy than he had originally suspected. Abberline becomes deeply involved with the case, which takes on personal meaning when he falls in love with Mary.

Abberline deduces that Masonic influence is involved in the murders. His superior, a high-ranking Freemason, opposes Abberline's methods and suspends him from the case. Thereafter, Abberline persists and discovers that Gull is the killer. Gull was instructed to dispose of all witnesses to the forbidden marriage of painter Walter Sickert to Ann Crook, the mother of his legitimate daughter, Alice. Sickert is revealed to be Prince Albert, grandson of the reigning Queen Victoria. Albert is dying of syphilis, which makes baby Alice the soon-to-be heiress to the British throne. (Note: In real life the Royal Marriages Act 1772 would make Albert's marriage legally null and void and Alice a bastard, because he did not get his grandmother's approval. If he did get approval, he would have instead disinherited himself by marrying a Catholic in contravention of the Act of Settlement 1701 before the article banning such marriages was removed by the Succession to the Crown Act 2013, but in that case Alice would have succession rights if not raised as or ever becoming a Catholic (like Lady Amelia Windsor).) Gull boasts to Abberline that he will be remembered in history for giving "birth to the 20th century". Abberline draws his gun, vowing that Gull will never see the 20th century, but before he is able to shoot Gull, he is knocked out by Ben Kidney, another Freemason.

The Freemasons try to eliminate Abberline without leaving any witnesses, but Abberline fights back and kills one of the assassins by overturning a carriage. Next, he rushes to save Mary but arrives too late, and blames his superior for not helping him or Godley on the cases. Going through the gruesome murder scene, Abberline discovers a brunette lock of hair differing from Mary's red, and conceals this evidence to protect her. Gull's increasingly sinister behaviour lends insight into his murderous, but calculating, mind. Rather than publicly charge Gull, the Freemasons lobotomize him to protect themselves and the royal family from the scandal. Gull defiantly states he has no equal among men, remaining unrepentant until the surgery, which renders him an invalid like Ann.

Abberline goes to the Ten Bells Tavern in Whitechapel and receives a mysterious letter from Mary. It is revealed that Gull had mistaken another prostitute, Ada, for Mary and killed her instead. Cautious of being watched closely by Freemasons, Abberline decides not to look for her despite knowing she's out there. He burns Mary's letter, knowing that he can never have a normal life with her. Sergeant Godley later finds Abberline dead of an opium overdose. Distraught, Godley places two coins over Abberline's eyes and mournfully says, "Good night, sweet prince."

Years later, Mary is shown to have adopted Alice, and the two are living in a cottage on a cliff by the sea in Ireland.

== Cast ==
- Johnny Depp as Inspector Frederick Abberline, a sympathetic police officer who investigates the Ripper murders. The consumption of drugs makes him dream scenes from the murders, but he nevertheless conducts the investigation in a rational way.
- Heather Graham as Mary Kelly, a young prostitute, who builds up a relationship with Abberline and eventually falls in love with him.
- Ian Holm as Sir William Gull, a retired surgeon and physician-in-extraordinary to Queen Victoria, teaching at the Royal London Hospital.
- Robbie Coltrane as Sergeant Peter Godley, the humorous and literary-minded subordinate assistant and friend of Abberline.
- Ian Richardson as Sir Charles Warren, a stiff bureaucrat and Abberline's superior.
- Jason Flemyng as John Netley, the coachman and stooge of the Ripper.
- Samantha Spiro as Martha Tabram, prostitute.
- Annabelle Apsion as Polly Nichols, prostitute.
- Katrin Cartlidge as Annie Chapman, prostitute.
- Susan Lynch as Liz Stride, prostitute.
- Lesley Sharp as Kate Eddowes, prostitute.
- Estelle Skornik as Ada, an old friend of Liz Stride from Brussels.
- Terence Harvey as Benjamin Kidney, the leader of London police's Special Branch.
- Paul Rhys as Dr. Ferral, an ambitious young doctor and specialist in the treatment of dementia.
- Vincent Franklin as George Lusk - chairman of the Whitechapel Vigilance Committee.
- Ian McNeice as coroner Robert Drudge
- David Schofield as McQueen
- Sophia Myles as Victoria Abberline, Frederick Abberline's late wife.
- Joanna Page as Ann Crook, Mary Kelly's friend, who was kidnapped.
- Mark Dexter as Prince Albert Victor aka Albert Sickert.
- Peter Eyre as Lord Hallsham.
- Anthony Parker as Joseph Merrick, The Elephant Man.

== Production ==
From Hell took several years to reach production, and two studios had owned the property before it found its home at 20th Century Fox. The Hughes Brothers originally wanted Daniel Day-Lewis to play Abberline. In a 1997 interview, Alan Moore stated that Sean Connery had been cast in the role. When Connery dropped out, the Hughes Brothers met with Brad Pitt and Jude Law before deciding to cast Johnny Depp. The Hughes Brothers were hired to direct From Hell after choosing not to work on Planet of the Apes.

Principal photography began on June 5, 2000 in and around Prague, Czech Republic and at Barrandov Studios on a massive backlot set recreating the 19th-century Whitechapel district of London. Additional exteriors were filmed in the United Kingdom, including at Crackington Haven, Boscastle in Cornwall and Goldings estate in Hertfordshire.

Nigel Hawthorne was originally cast as Sir William Gull, but on July 26, 2000, it was announced that Hawthorne had withdrawn from the role because of his terminal cancer. He was replaced by Ian Holm. The disparity in height between Hawthorne and the much shorter Holm forced some of the scenes to be altered. Hawthorne died two months after the film's release.

As some critics considered the film to be too violent and gory, it was edited in order to avoid an NC-17 rating by the Motion Picture Association of America. Eventually, it received an R rating due to "strong violence/gore, sexuality, language and drug content".

From Hell's premiere took place at the Toronto International Film Festival in September 2001. During the September 11 attacks, Graham was flying to New York City for a number of meetings with film directors when she saw smoke coming from the World Trade Center.

Marilyn Manson originally intended to work with the film's composer Trevor Jones to remix portions of the score for use within the film. It proved impossible to do this work before the film's release date, so Manson instead contributed a remixed version of his song The Nobodies, which plays over the film's end credits.

== Reception ==
=== Critical response ===
On Rotten Tomatoes, 56% of 151 critics gave the film a positive review. The site's critic consensus reads: "Visually impressive, but this latest Ripper tale is dull and far from scary." On Metacritic, the film has a weighted average score of 54 out of 100, based on 32 critics, indicating "mixed or average" reviews. Audiences polled by CinemaScore gave the film an average grade of "B−" on an A+ to F scale.

E! Online stated that the film is "two hours of gory murders, non-sequitur scenes, and an undeveloped romance" and gave the film a C−. The New York Post called it a "gripping and stylish thriller". Roger Ebert gave the film three stars out of four. Leonard Maltin gave the film three stars, calling it "colorful and entertaining; an impressive showing for the Hughes Brothers." Joe Leydon of The San Francisco Examiner gave the film a scoring of three stars, saying "Much like Sleepy Hollow, From Hell will delight movie buffs with key elements of its lavish production design". Michael Sragow of The Baltimore Sun gave it a one-and-a-half star rating, stating that "a visionary sort of horror movie should ponder three words: Bram Stoker's Dracula". Robert W. Butler of The Kansas City Star described the film as "delivered with a visual flourish that puts even Tim Burton to shame".

Empire's Kim Newman awarded the film four out of five stars, praising the "range of squirmingly superior British acting talent" although noting that "the script can't quite sell its Jack as at once a purposeful assassin and a mad killer." Philip French was impressed by the film, praising Depp's "very good" performance as well as those who played the Ripper's victims. French also praised the production design and cinematography, which evoked representations of London by the artists Whistler and John Atkinson Grimshaw.

The original comic's writer, Alan Moore, despite praising the directors, criticized the replacement of his "gruff" version of Frederick Abberline with an "absinthe-swilling dandy".

=== Box office ===
From Hell grossed $31.6 million in the United States and a total of $74.6 million worldwide.

During its opening weekend, the film earned $11 million and finished in first place at the box office, beating Training Day, Riding in Cars with Boys and The Last Castle. It dropped into third place in its second weekend behind K-PAX and Thirteen Ghosts with $6.3 million. When Monsters, Inc. was released on its third weekend, From Hell would hold on with a 38% drop, ranking in seventh place and earning $3.7 million.

In the United Kingdom, From Hell made $1.2 million in its opening weekend, putting the film in sixth place behind Monsters, Inc., The Lord of the Rings: The Fellowship of the Ring, Shallow Hal, Vanilla Sky and Gosford Park.

== Home media ==
From Hell was released by 20th Century Fox Home Entertainment on DVD and VHS on May 14, 2002. The DVD release consists of single-disc and two-disc directors' limited-edition versions. These versions are both THX-certified and the disc menus contain hidden Easter eggs. There is also a DTS 5.1 audio track on the DVD. On the limited edition release, the first disc features an audio commentary to listen during the movie and several deleted scenes. The second disc includes an interactive documentary called Jack the Ripper: 6 Degrees of Separation, an HBO special called A View From Hell, trailers for the film itself and Unfaithful, behind-the-scenes featurettes and more. On October 9, 2007, the film was released on Blu-ray.

== See also ==
- From Hell letter
- Murder by Decree
- Jack the Ripper

== Notes ==
Preceded by Training Day	Box office number-one films of 2001 (USA); October 21	Succeeded by K-PAX
