= The Criminologist (magazine) =

British crime magazine

The Criminologist was a crime magazine, published quarterly in the United Kingdom between 1967 and 1998. It was edited by writer Nigel Morland, who worked as a crime journalist and also as a writer of crime fiction, creating the detective Palmyra Pym in 1935.

The Criminologist is known for publishing an article in its November 1970 issue by Thomas Stowell titled Jack the Ripper - A solution? The article was the original source for the Jack the Ripper royal conspiracy theories by appearing to implicate Prince Albert Victor, Duke of Clarence and Avondale, in the 1888 "Jack the Ripper" Whitechapel murders.
