= Theodore Acland =

English educationist & clergyman (1890-1960)

Theodore William Gull Acland (7 November 1890 – 13 October 1960) was an English educationist who in later life became a clergyman of the Church of England.

== Background and early life ==
Acland was the son of Theodore Dyke Acland and his wife Caroline Cameron Gull. He was the grandson of Sir Henry Acland, 1st Baronet and of Sir William Gull, 1st Baronet. His great-grandfather, Sir Thomas Dyke Acland, 10th Baronet (1787–1871), had been a member of parliament, one of the Devonshire Aclands, an old family. Acland had one sister, Aimee Sarah Agnes Dyke Acland, who died in infancy in 1889.

He was educated at Gresham's School, Holt, King's College, Cambridge (where he was an exhibitioner), and the University of Berlin. At Cambridge, in 1912 and 1913, he took a First in both parts of the Natural Sciences Tripos, specializing in Chemistry at Part II. In 1913, he headed the list of Cambridge Firsts awarded in Natural Sciences.

== Career ==
Completing his education just as the First World War broke out, Acland was commissioned into the London Electrical Engineers as a second lieutenant in October 1914, then seconded for technical duties with the Department of Explosives Supplies and in 1915 with the Munitions Inventions Department. From 1920 to 1922 he served on the technical staff of Brunner, Mond & Co., then for a year with Garton & Co. From 1923 to 1930 he was a master at Stowe School, in Buckinghamshire, where he became a housemaster in 1924. He was then Headmaster of King Edward VI School, Norwich, from 1930 to 1943.

Acland was also a member of the Court of Governors, of St Thomas's Hospital, London, from 1931 to 1948, and of the Grand Committee, from 1945 until his death. He was honorary secretary of the Clergy Widows' Fund for the Diocese of London, and was Diocesan Officer from 1944 to 1946, member of the Standing Committee of the Society for Promoting Christian Knowledge from 1946 to 1952, of the Board of Governors of the Federation for Animal Welfare, 1946 to 1951, of the Council of St Katharine's Training College, Tottenham, 1945 to 1948, of the London Diocesan Conference, 1946 to 1949, of the Central Advisory Council of Training for the Ministry, 1943 to 1953, of the Central Council for Women's Church Work, 1948 to 1953, of the Council of Bishops College, Cheshunt, 1946 to 1959, of the Council of the Missions to Seamen, of the Board of the Church Army and of the Christian Evidence Society. He represented St Thomas's Hospital on the governing body of St Olave's and St Saviour's Grammar School, Orpington.

He was ordained a deacon in 1953 and a priest in 1957 and served as honorary curate of St Bartholomew, Hyde, Winchester, from 1953 to 1955, and of St Luke, Stanmore, Winchester, from 1955.

== Private life ==
Acland married Mary, the daughter of Robert Maxwell Moffat, on 24 May 1944, but they had no children. In Who's Who, he gave his recreation as 'travelling' and his clubs as the Athenaeum and the Royal Commonwealth Society. He died on 13 October 1960, at the age of sixty-nine.
