= Gull baronets =

Baronetcy in the Baronetage of the United Kingdom

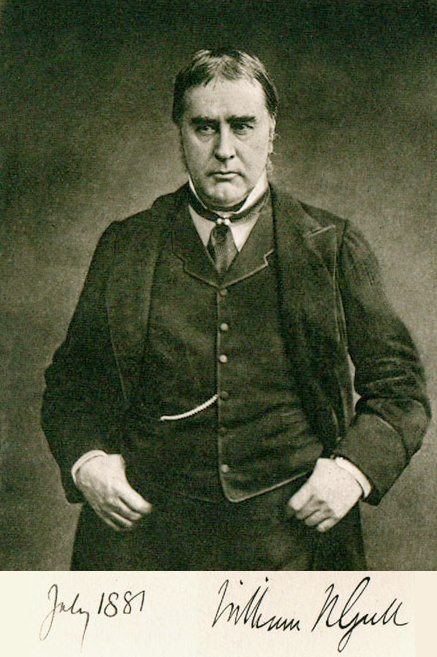
Sir William Gull, 1st Baronet

The Gull Baronetcy, of Brook Street in the parish of St George Hanover Square in the County of Middlesex, is a title in the Baronetage of the United Kingdom. It was created on 8 February 1872 for the physician William Gull. The baronetcy was conferred on him for his services to the Prince of Wales during his severe illness in the winter of 1871. The second Baronet represented Barnstaple in the House of Commons as a Liberal Unionist from 1895 to 1900.

== Gull baronets, of Brook Street (1872) ==
- Sir William Withey Gull, 1st Baronet (1816–1890)
- Sir William Cameron Gull, 2nd Baronet (1860–1922)
- Sir Richard Cameron Gull, 3rd Baronet (1894–1960)
- Sir Michael Swinnerton Cameron Gull, 4th Baronet (1919–1989)
- Sir Rupert William Cameron Gull, 5th Baronet (born 1954)

The heir presumptive is Angus William John Gull (born 1963), a cousin of the present holder.
