= George Godley =

British police officer

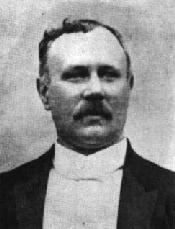
George Godley

George Albert Godley (31 October 1857 – 20 July 1941) was a police officer of the Metropolitan Police who was involved in the hunt for Jack the Ripper in 1888.

Born at East Grinstead in Sussex in 1857, the third eldest of 11 children born to George Godley (1829–1900), a sawyer, and Elizabeth (née Howard, born 1830), like his father, George Albert Godley initially worked as a sawyer. He then joined the Metropolitan Police on 26 February 1877, and was assigned warrant number 61230. At the time of the Jack the Ripper murders in 1888 Godley was a Sergeant in London's J Division (Bethnal Green). He transferred to H Division (Whitechapel) where he assisted Inspector Frederick Abberline in the hunt for the killer. The Times of 12 November 1888 reported:

"Since the murders in Berner Street, St. Georges, and Mitre Square, Aldgate, on September 30th, Detective Inspectors Reid, Moore and Nairn, and Sergeants Thick, Godley, M'Carthy and Pearce have been constantly engaged, under the direction of Inspector Abberline (Scotland Yard), in prosecuting inquiries, but, unfortunately, up to the present time without any practical result. As an instance of the magnitude of their labours, each officer has had, on average, during the last six weeks to make some 30 separate inquiries weekly, and these have had to be made in different portions of the metropolis and suburbs. Since the two above-mentioned murders no fewer than 1,400 letters relating to the tragedies have been received by the police, and although the greater portion of these gratuitous communications were found to be of a trivial and even ridiculous character, still each one was thoroughly investigated. On Saturday (10th November) many more letters were received, and these are now being inquired into."

When Godley arrested poisoner George Chapman in 1902 the then retired Inspector Abberline allegedly said "You have caught Jack the Ripper at last" or similar words.

Godley retired on 20 January 1908 by which time he was an Inspector in K Division. He died in July 1941 aged 83.

In 1881 he married Emma Adeline Mitchell (1863–1936). They had three children: Albert George Godley (1892–1972), Arthur Godley (born 1894) and Ella Adeline Godley (born 1897). His cousin was Sidney Frank Godley who won the Victoria Cross during World War I.

== In film and fiction ==
In the 1988 TV miniseries Jack the Ripper starring Michael Caine Godley was played by Lewis Collins and in the 2001 film From Hell, the character 'Peter Godley' played by Robbie Coltrane was based on George Godley.
