= From Hell =

Graphic novel by Alan Moore and Eddie Campbell

- From Hell collected edition

Publication information
- Publisher: United States: Eddie Campbell Comics; Top Shelf Productions; United Kingdom: Knockabout Comics
- Publication date: 1999 (collected edition)

Creative team
- Written by: Alan Moore
- Artist: Eddie Campbell

Collected editions
- Master Edition: ISBN 1603094695

From Hell is a graphic novel written by Alan Moore and illustrated by Eddie Campbell, originally published in serial form from 1989 to 1998. The full collection was published in 1999 by Top Shelf Productions.

Set during the Whitechapel murders of the late Victorian era, the novel speculates upon the identity and motives of Jack the Ripper. The novel depicts several true events surrounding the murders, although portions have been fictionalised, particularly the identity of the killer and the precise nature and circumstances of the murders.

The title is taken from the first words of the "From Hell" letter, which some authorities believe was an authentic message sent from the killer in 1888. The collected edition is 572 pages long. The 2000 and later editions are the most common prints. The comic was loosely adapted into a film, released in 2001. In 2000, the graphic novel was banned in Australia for several weeks after customs officers seized copies of the seventh issue from a shipment intended for Quality Comics.

== Development ==
Moore began developing the plot for From Hell in the late 1980s. Writer Neil Gaiman recalled Moore calling him up to discuss a television documentary he had just seen about Jack the Ripper, and then asking for Gaiman's help tracking down "rare and forgotten biographies of possible Ripper suspects at the British Museum".

From Hell takes as its premise Stephen Knight's theory that the Jack the Ripper murders were part of a conspiracy to conceal the birth of an illegitimate royal baby fathered by the royal heir Prince Albert Victor ("Eddy"), slightly modified: the involvement of Walter Sickert is reduced, and Knight's allegation that the child's mother was a Catholic has been dropped. Knight's theories have been described as "a good fictional read" whose "conclusions have been disproved numerous times".

== Publication history ==
From Hell was originally serialized as one of several features in Taboo, an anthology comic book published by Steve Bissette's Spiderbaby Grafix. After running in Taboo #2–7 (1989–1992), Moore and Campbell moved the project to its own series, published first by Tundra Publishing, then by Kitchen Sink Press. The series was published in ten volumes between 1991 and 1996, and an appendix, From Hell: The Dance of the Gull-catchers, was published in 1998. The entire series was collected in a trade paperback and published by Eddie Campbell Comics in 1999; trade paperback and hardcover versions were published by Top Shelf Productions in the United States and Knockabout Comics in the UK. A fully colorized Master Edition was serialized starting in September 2018.

== Plot ==
Prince Albert Victor, Duke of Clarence, also known as Prince Eddie, secretly marries and fathers a child with Annie Crook, a shop girl in London's East End. Prince Eddie had visited the area under an assumed name and Annie is unaware of her husband's royal position. Queen Victoria becomes aware of the marriage and has Albert separated forcibly from his wife, whom she places in an asylum. Victoria then instructs her royal physician Sir William Gull to impair Annie's sanity, which he does by damaging or impairing her thyroid gland. The prince's daughter is taken to Annie's parents by the artist Walter Sickert, a friend of Eddie's who had accompanied him on his trips to the East End. Annie's father believes the child to be his through an incestuous relationship with his daughter. Sickert reluctantly leaves the child with Annie's parents.

The potentially scandalous matter is resolved, until a group of prostitutes – Annie's friends Mary Kelly, Polly Nichols, Anne Chapman, and Liz Stride – who are aware of the illegitimate child and its royal connections, attempt to blackmail Sickert. After Queen Victoria learns of the blackmail attempt, Gull is enlisted to silence the group of women. The police are granted prior knowledge of Gull's intentions, and are adjured not to interfere until the plot is completed.

Gull, a high-ranking Freemason, murders the four women in Whitechapel with the aid of a carriage driver, John Netley. While he justifies the murders by claiming they are a Masonic warning to an apparent Illuminati threat to the throne, the killings are, in Gull's mind, part of an elaborate mystical ritual to ensure male societal dominance over women. While targeting Kelly, Gull also kills Catherine Eddowes, who was using Kelly's name as an alias. As the killings progress, Gull becomes psychologically unhinged and has a vision of the future while murdering a woman he believes to be Kelly.

Gull takes Netley on a tour of London landmarks, expounding on their hidden mystical significance. Later, Gull forces the semi-literate Netley to write the infamous From Hell letter. Following this, several people write letters to the police claiming to be the murderer, and the nickname "Jack the Ripper" becomes a household name.

Inspector Frederick Abberline, who once patrolled Whitechapel as a police officer, investigates the Ripper crimes without success. He meets Robert James Lees, a fraudulent psychic who acts as a spiritual advisor to Queen Victoria. Lees, acting on a personal grudge against Gull who had slighted him upon a previous encounter, contacts Abberline and identifies Gull as the murderer. Abberline and Lees confront Gull, who instantly confesses. Abberline reports the confession to his superiors at Scotland Yard, who cover up the discovery. The police inform both Abberline and Lees that Gull was operating alone and was gripped by insanity. Abberline later discovers Gull's intentions to cover up the matter of the royal "bastard" fathered by the Duke of Clarence. He resigns from the Metropolitan Police in protest of the official cover-up of the murders, and contemplates leaving England to join the Pinkertons.

Gull is tried by a secret Masonic council, which determines he is insane. Gull refuses to submit to the council, informing them that because of his accomplishments and his visions, no man amongst them may be counted as his peer and cannot judge the "mighty work" he has wrought. A phony funeral is staged, and Gull is imprisoned under a pseudonym "Thomas Mason." The Freemasons frame boarding school teacher Montague Druitt as a suspect, killing him and making his death look like suicide. Years later, and moments before his death, Gull has an extended mystical experience, where his spirit travels through time, observing the crimes of the London Monster, instigating or inspiring a number of other killers (Peter Sutcliffe, Ian Brady), causing Netley's death, as well as serving as the inspiration for both Robert Louis Stevenson's Strange Case of Dr Jekyll and Mr Hyde and William Blake's painting The Ghost of a Flea. The last experience his spirit undergoes before it "becomes God" is visiting a woman living in Ireland. The woman has four children who are named after the women murdered by Gull in Whitechapel. She is apparently able to see Gull's spirit, and abjures him to begone "back to Hell."

== Interpretations and themes ==
From Hell was partly inspired by the title of Douglas Adams' novel Dirk Gently's Holistic Detective Agency, in that it explores the notion that to solve a crime holistically, one would need to solve the entire society in which it occurred.

From Hell also explores Moore's ideas on the nature of time. Early on, Gull's friend James Hinton discusses his son Howard's theory of the "fourth dimension", which proposes that time is a spatial dimension. All time co-exists, and it is only the limits of our perception that make it appear to progress. Sequences of related events can be seen as shapes in the fourth dimension: history can "be said to have an architecture", as Gull puts it. Gull's experiences seem to confirm this: he has visions of the 20th century during the murders, and as he is dying he experiences, and appears to influence, past and future events. Moore had earlier explored similar ideas in Watchmen, where Doctor Manhattan perceives past, present and future simultaneously, and describes himself as "a puppet who can see the strings".

Critic Gary Groth says the most elaborate theme in From Hell stems from Moore's statement that "the Ripper murders – happening when they did and where they did – were almost like an apocalyptic summary of... that entire Victorian age."

== Awards ==
From Hell won several Eisner Awards, including "Best Serialized Story" (1993), "Best Writer" (1995, 1996, 1997), and "Best Graphic Album – Reprint" (2000). It won the 1995 Harvey Award for Best Continuing or Limited Series, and the collected edition won the 2000 Harvey Award for Best Graphic Album of Previously Published Work.

The book also won the 2000 Eagle Award for Favourite Trade Paperback/Reprint Collection, and the "Prix de la critique" at the Angoulême International Comics Festival in 2001, for the French edition published by Éditions Delcourt.

The collected edition was a top vote getter for the Comics Buyer's Guide Fan Award for Favorite Reprint Graphic Album in 1999.

During its initial serialization, From Hell received the 1996 International Horror Guild Award for Graphic Story/illustrated Narrative, and the 1997 Ignatz Award for Outstanding Story.

== Film adaptation ==
A film, loosely based on the series, was made by the Hughes brothers in 2001, starring Johnny Depp, Heather Graham, and Ian Holm. It received mixed reviews from critics, with a rating of 57% on review aggregator website Rotten Tomatoes.
