= Murder by Decree =

1979 film by Bob Clark

- Theatrical release poster
- Directed by: Bob Clark
- Screenplay by: John Hopkins
- Based on: The Ripper File by John Lloyd; Elwyn Jones; Sherlock Holmes characters by Sir Arthur Conan Doyle
- Produced by: Bob Clark; René Dupont
- Starring: Christopher Plummer; James Mason; David Hemmings; Susan Clark; Anthony Quayle; John Gielgud; Frank Finlay; Donald Sutherland; Genevieve Bujold
- Cinematography: Reginald H. Morris
- Edited by: Stan Cole
- Music by: Paul Zaza; Carl Zittrer
- Production companies: CFDC; Famous Players
- Distributed by: AVCO Embassy Pictures (in the United Kingdom through Columbia-EMI-Warner Distributors); Ambassador Film Distributors (Canada)
- Release dates: 1 February 1979 (University Theatre, Toronto)
- Running time: 124 minutes
- Countries: Canada; United Kingdom
- Language: English
- Budget: $5 million
- Box office: $1.9 million (Canada)

Murder by Decree is a 1979 mystery thriller film directed by Bob Clark. It features the Sherlock Holmes and Dr. John Watson characters created by Sir Arthur Conan Doyle, who are embroiled in the investigation surrounding the real-life 1888 Whitechapel murders committed by Jack the Ripper. Christopher Plummer plays Holmes and James Mason plays Watson. Though it features a similar premise, it is somewhat different in tone and result to A Study in Terror. It is loosely based on The Ripper File by Elwyn Jones and John Lloyd.

The film's premise of the plot behind the murders is influenced by the book Jack the Ripper: The Final Solution (1976), by Stephen Knight, who theorised that the killings were part of a Masonic plot. The original script contained the names of the historical suspects, Sir William Gull and John Netley. In the actual film, they are represented by fictional analogues: Thomas Spivey (Gull) and William Slade (Netley). This plot device was later used in other Jack the Ripper-themed fiction, including the graphic novel From Hell.

== Plot ==
After the Metropolitan Police fail to apprehend the serial killer Jack the Ripper, Sherlock Holmes is approached to investigate the recent murders of prostitutes in the Whitechapel district of London. Helped by Dr. John Watson and the medium Robert Lees, Holmes discovers that all the victims were companions of Annie Crook, a woman locked in a mental institution.

Members of the police hierarchy and several politicians, all Freemasons, seem to be protecting one of their own. Furthermore, Inspector Foxborough, the policeman who is in charge of the case, is in fact the secret leader of the radicals, a political movement waiting for the British government to fall because of its inability to solve the Whitechapel murders. Holmes must rely on his skills to find and confront the murderer.

== Cast ==
- Christopher Plummer as Sherlock Holmes
- James Mason as Dr. John Watson
- David Hemmings as Inspector Foxborough
- Susan Clark as Mary Kelly
- Frank Finlay as Inspector G. Lestrade
- Anthony Quayle as Sir Charles Warren
- Donald Sutherland as Robert Lees
- Geneviève Bujold as Annie Crook
- John Gielgud as Lord Salisbury
- Peter Jonfield as William Slade
- Roy Lansford as Sir Thomas Spivey
- Ron Pember as Makins

== Production ==
The film was directed by Bob Clark and written by playwright John Hopkins, who scripted the James Bond film Thunderball (1965). The script partially was inspired by Elwyn Jones's book The Ripper File. Hopkins referenced Sir Arthur Conan Doyle's work, particularly Sherlock Holmes' deduction and science skills but downplayed other aspects of the characters, such as Holmes' drug use, in favour of making them more likeable and human.

The film stars Christopher Plummer and James Mason as Holmes and Dr. John Watson respectively, and presents a largely different version of Holmes from the Basil Rathbone movies of the 1940s, with the aesthete still prevailing, yet tinged with humanity and emotional empathy. Plummer stated that he tried to make Holmes more human and caring, saying "This is a passionate and caring Holmes." Mason's Watson is also a departure from previous incarnations; although he may appear at first to resemble the bumbling Nigel Bruce version of the character, he soon shows his level head and scientific and medical training to be as valuable assets as they were in the original stories. Like Plummer, Mason wanted to play up Watson's skills and avoid the buffoonish way the character had been portrayed before. Mason received especially good reviews for his performance. Plummer had earlier portrayed Holmes in 1977's Silver Blaze.

The supporting cast includes Donald Sutherland, Susan Clark, John Gielgud, Anthony Quayle, David Hemmings and Geneviève Bujold. Frank Finlay plays Inspector G. Lestrade, a part he had portrayed in the similar film A Study in Terror (1965), in which Quayle also played a supporting role. Finlay continued his association with Holmes by appearing in an episode of Granada TV's Sherlock Holmes, starring Jeremy Brett.

The film was shot on location in London in 1978. The interior sets, including a vast Victorian era street, were created at Elstree Studios. The docks set was built at Shepperton Studios.

$3 million of the budget came from Canada, $2 million from the UK.

== Reception ==
Vincent Canby of The New York Times called the film "a good deal of uncomplicated fun, not in a class with Nicholas Meyer's The Seven Percent Solution, but certainly miles ahead of many other current movies that masquerade as popular entertainment". A review in Variety called it "probably the best Sherlock Holmes film since the inimitable pairing of Basil Rathbone and Nigel Bruce in the 1940s series at Universal. Unfortunately, it also shares some of the defects of those films, i.e. slow pacing, an improbable story line, and an undue emphasis on odd characters." Gene Siskel of the Chicago Tribune gave the film two-and-a-half stars out of four and wrote that its "biggest problem is its script, which runs on for a full 120 minutes with no place to go. We see a couple of murders, meet a psychic (Donald Sutherland) and a long-suffering woman trapped in a psychiatric prison (Genevieve Bujold), then the story doubles back with recapitulation after recapitulation. The film has at least two false endings. I mistakenly put on my coat with one reel to go. All of this is a shame, because the cast is excellent." Kevin Thomas of the Los Angeles Times wrote, "Unfortunately, under Bob Clark's uninspired, plodding direction, Hopkins' elaborations make for a slow and ponderous film, despite a starry cast and some scary moments. Not helping matters is Christopher Plummer's rather colorless Sherlock Holmes. The one real joy in the film is James Mason's warm, loyal, sometimes dense Dr. Watson." Lawrence O'Toole of Maclean's declared, "If you were to look for the right word to describe Murder By Decree you would have to go into the archives, lift it lightly from its resting place, and dust it off. The word? Splendid." Gary Arnold of The Washington Post stated, "While never as playful or ingenious as Nicholas Meyer's screenplay for The Seven Per-Cent Solution, Hopkins' mystery is crisp and chilling right up to the denouement. At that point it might be wise to edge toward the exits, since the solution leaves much to be desired." David Ansen of Newsweek wrote that the film was "not a new idea" but declared it "a decided success. Christopher Plummer and James Mason seize their roles like a couple of happy musicians handed prize antique instruments: their duets are by turns droll, lyric and touching."

The film was nominated for eight Genie Awards at the 1st Genie Awards in 1980, of which it won five, including Best Achievement in Direction (Bob Clark), Best Performance by an Actor in a Leading Role (Christopher Plummer), Best Performance by an Actress in a Supporting Role (Geneviève Bujold), Best Achievement in Film Editing and Outstanding Musical Score. It was also nominated for Best Achievement in Cinematography, Best Achievement in Sound Editing and Best Achievement in Sound.

The film was the fourth highest-grossing film ever in Canada, with a gross of $1.9 million. On Rotten Tomatoes, it holds a rating of 81% from 16 reviews.

== See also ==
- Dust and Shadow: An Account of the Ripper Killings by Dr. John H. Watson
- The Last Sherlock Holmes Story
