= Thomas E. A. Stowell =

British physician (1885–1970)

Thomas Edmund Alexander Stowell

Thomas Edmund Alexander Stowell CBE, FRCS (1885 – 8 November 1970) was a British physician.

Stowell was educated at St Paul's School, followed by St Thomas' Hospital. From 1910, he took clinical training at St Thomas's Hospital, Grimsby and District Hospital, and the Royal Southern Hospital, Liverpool. He qualified as a Fellow of the Royal College of Surgeons in 1912. In 1927, he gained a Doctorate in Medicine, and in 1954 he received the Diploma in Industrial Health honoris causa from the Worshipful Society of Apothecaries.

Stowell was descended from William Scott, 1st Baron Stowell. In 1913, he married Lillian Elizabeth Wagner. Their son, Eldon Stowell, was also a doctor. Their only daughter died in an accident in 1958.

His clinical appointments included assistant ophthalmic surgeon at St Andrew's Hospital, Bromley-by-Bow, and Battersea General Hospital; surgeon at St Mary's Hospital, Sidcup; honorary surgeon at Northwich Infirmary; senior honorary surgeon and radiologist at the Mid Cheshire Orthopaedic Clinic, Northwich; and consulting surgeon in the Emergency Medical Service.

He was chief medical officer to Imperial Chemical Industries, traumatic surgeon to Brunner Mond, and a founder of the Association of Industrial Medical Officers (now the Society of Occupational Medicine). He served as chair of the Council of Industrial Medicine, the medical advisory committee of the Industrial Welfare Society, the British Committee of International Congresses on Industrial Health and Safety, and the British Organizing Council for the IX International Council of Industrial Health in London in 1948. For his work in the latter appointment, he was appointed a Commander of the Order of the British Empire in 1949.

Outside of medicine, Stowell entered the public eye just a few days before his death because of an article he had published in the November 1970 issue of The Criminologist. Stowell appeared to indicate that he either possessed or had seen evidence implicating Prince Albert Victor, Duke of Clarence and Avondale, in the notorious "Jack the Ripper" murders eighty years before. During an appearance on the BBC current affairs programme 24 Hours on 2 November, Stowell "seemed to accept tacitly" that the Duke was the Ripper. However, on 5 November 1970 Stowell wrote to The Times newspaper, "I have at no time associated His Royal Highness, the late Duke of Clarence, with the Whitechapel murderer." The letter was published on 9 November, the day after Stowell's own death. The same week, Stowell's son reported that he had burned his father's papers, saying "I read just sufficient to make certain that there was nothing of importance." Stowell's article awakened public interest in the Ripper murders, and the supposed connection of Prince Albert Victor to the murders was later developed by other writers, such as Stephen Knight in Jack the Ripper: The Final Solution.

Stowell's other interests included Freemasonry. He privately published The Centenary History of Cornubian Lodge 450 of Free and Accepted Masons in 1950.

Stowell's obituary in the British Medical Journal described him as "a tall elegant figure, with an intellectual face and sporting a monocle. Naturally witty, he was gifted with a fine sense of humour and a sense of fun. All this considered, and given that he was a splendid raconteur, he made an admirable companion."
