= Stephen Knight (author) =

British journalist and author

- Stephen Knight c.1976
- Born: 26 September 1951; Hainault, Essex, England
- Died: 25 July 1985 (aged 33); Carradale, Argyll, Scotland
- Occupation: Journalist
- Spouse: Margot Kenrick (1976–1980)
- Children: 1
- Writing career
- Period: 1976–1984
- Subject: Crime
- Notable works: Jack the Ripper: The Final Solution; The Brotherhood

Stephen Knight (26 September 1951 – 25 July 1985) was a British journalist and author. He is best remembered for the books Jack the Ripper: The Final Solution (1976) and his anti-Masonic exposé, The Brotherhood (1984).

== Life and works ==
Born in Hainault in Essex as Stephen Victor Knight, he attended West Hatch Technical High School, at nearby Chigwell. He was not successful academically, and after leaving school at 16 Knight went to work as a salesman for the London Electricity Board in Chigwell. At 18 he got a job as a reporter on the Ilford Pictorial before moving to the Hornchurch Echo.

His book Jack the Ripper: The Final Solution (1976) suggested that the Ripper murders were part of a conspiracy between Freemasons and the British royal family, a claim which is not accepted by historians. Nevertheless, the book became a bestseller, and was the inspiration for several works of fiction, among them the film Murder by Decree (1979) by Bob Clark and the graphic novel From Hell by Alan Moore and Eddie Campbell. In 1980, he appeared in a documentary film based on his book, produced by R.W.B. Production Australia.

The Brotherhood (1984) was published at a time when Freemasonry was coming under increasing scrutiny in the United Kingdom. Knight's last book before his death was The Killing of Justice Godfrey, exploring the death of Edmund Berry Godfrey in 1678, which had caused widespread anti-Catholic sentiment in England.

In 1983 he became a religious follower of Bhagwan Shree Rajneesh and, as a part of this interest, took the name Swami Puja Debal. He began to experience epileptic seizures in 1977, and in 1980 was discovered to have a brain tumour while taking part in a documentary for the Horizon television series. The tumour was removed, but returned in 1984.

Knight died from a brain tumour in July 1985 at the age of 33 while staying with friends at Carradale in Argyllshire. He was buried there.

== Private life ==
In 1976 he married Margot Kenrick; they had a daughter. The couple later separated, and in November 1980 Knight announced that, when his divorce came through, he would marry Lesley Newson, a researcher on Horizon. However, the couple later also separated. His partner during his last years was Barbara Mary Land.

== Works ==
=== Non-fiction ===
- Jack the Ripper: The Final Solution (1976)
- The Brotherhood (1984)
- The Killing of Justice Godfrey: an investigation into England's most remarkable unsolved murder (1984)

=== Fiction ===
- Requiem at Rogano (1979)

=== Film ===
- Jack the Ripper: The Final Solution (1980)
