= Aaron Kosminski =

Polish barber and Jack the Ripper suspect (1865-1919)

- Born: Aron Mordke Kozmiński; 11 September 1865; Kłodawa, Congress Poland, Russian Empire
- Died: 24 March 1919 (aged 53); Leavesden Hospital, Hertfordshire, England
- Occupation: Hairdresser
- Known for: Jack the Ripper suspect

Aaron Kosminski (born Aron Mordke Kozmiński; 11 September 1865 – 24 March 1919) was a Polish barber who is a suspect in the Jack the Ripper murders of 1888.

Kosminski was a Polish Jew who emigrated from Congress Poland to England in the 1880s. He worked as a hairdresser in Whitechapel in the East End of London, where a series of murders ascribed to an unidentified person nicknamed "Jack the Ripper" were committed in 1888. Beginning in 1891, Kosminski was institutionalised after he threatened his sister with a knife. He was first held at the Colney Hatch Lunatic Asylum and then transferred to the Leavesden Asylum.

Police officials from the time of the murders named one of their suspects as "Kosminski" (the forename was not given) and described him as a Polish Jew in an insane asylum. Almost a century after the final murder, the suspect "Kosminski" was identified as Aaron Kosminski. Still, there was little evidence to connect him with the "Kosminski" who was suspected of the murders, and their dates of death were different. Possibly, Kosminski was confused with another Polish Jew of the same age named Aaron or David Cohen (real name possibly Nathan Kaminsky), who was a violent patient at the Colney Hatch Asylum.

In September 2014, author Russell Edwards claimed in the book Naming Jack the Ripper to have proved Kosminski's guilt. In 2007, he bought a shawl, which he believed to have been left at a murder scene, and gave it to biochemist Jari Louhelainen to test for DNA. A peer-reviewed article on the DNA analysis was published in the Journal of Forensic Sciences in 2019. Scientists from Innsbruck Medical University criticised the paper and its conclusions, substantiating that there were mistakes and (mis)assumptions made by its authors, and the journal printed an expression of concern.

== Life ==
Aaron Kosminski was born in Kłodawa in Congress Poland, then part of the Russian Empire. His parents were Abram Józef Kozmiński, a tailor, and his wife Golda née Lubnowska. He may have been employed in a hospital as a hairdresser or orderly for a time. Kosminski emigrated from Poland to England, arriving in or around 1881. He probably accompanied his brother Woolf and his sister Matilda and brother-in-law Morris Lubnowski, who arrived in London in June 1881 (Woolf having married at Klodawa in May 1881, and the Lubnowskis having lived in Germany in the late 1870s). Woolf and Aaron may have left Poland as a result of the April 1881 pogroms following the assassination of Tsar Alexander II, the impetus for many other Jews to emigrate. His mother, who was listed as a widow, apparently did not emigrate with the family immediately, but had joined them by 1894. His father died in 1874.

In London, the family settled in Whitechapel, an impoverished district in London's East End that had become home to many Jewish refugees who were fleeing economic hardship in Eastern Europe and pogroms in Tsarist Russia. English records describe him as a hairdresser, but he may have worked only sporadically: it was reported that he had "not attempted any kind of work for years" by 1891. He presumably relied on his siblings for financial support, and is known to have lived with his brother Woolf at 3 Sion Square in 1890 and his sister Matilda at 16 Greenfield Street in 1891, indicating that his siblings possibly shared responsibility for caring for him and he alternated living between their family homes.

On 14 December 1889, Aaron was fined 10 shillings at the City of London Summons Court for having a dog unmuzzled in Cheapside. He was also accused of having given the police a false name and address. Apparently he had given his name as Abrahams rather than Kosminski, and in court he explained that "II goes by the name of Abrahams sometimes, because Kosmunski [sic] is hard to spell", and called his brother as a witness to confirm this. According to one report, he refused to pay the fine on Saturday because it was the Sabbath, and was given until Monday to pay.

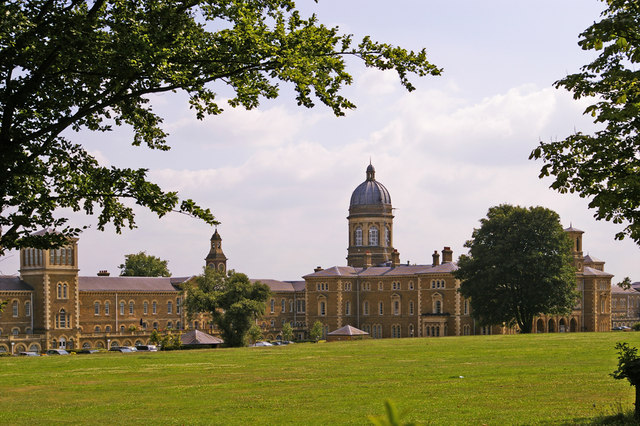
Colney Hatch Lunatic Asylum, North London. Kosminski was an inmate from 1891 to 1894.

On 12 July 1890, Kosminski was placed in Mile End Old Town workhouse due to his worsening mental illness, with his brother Woolf certifying the entry, and was released three days later. On 4 February 1891, he was returned to the workhouse, possibly by the police, and on 7 February, he was transferred to Colney Hatch Lunatic Asylum. A witness to the certification of his entry, recorded as Jacob Cohen, gave some basic background information and stated that Kosminski had threatened his sister with a knife. It is unclear whether this meant Kosminski's sister or Cohen's. Kosminski remained at the Colney Hatch Lunatic Asylum for the next three years until he was admitted on 19 April 1894 to Leavesden Asylum. Case notes indicate that Kosminski had been ill since at least 1885. His insanity took the form of auditory hallucinations, a paranoid fear of being fed by other people that drove him to pick up and eat food dropped as litter, and a refusal to wash or bathe. The cause of his insanity was recorded as "self-abuse", which is thought to be a euphemism for masturbation. His poor diet seems to have kept him in an emaciated state for years; his low weight was recorded in the asylum case notes. By February 1919, he weighed just 96 pounds (44 kg). He died the following month, aged 53.

== Jack the Ripper suspect ==
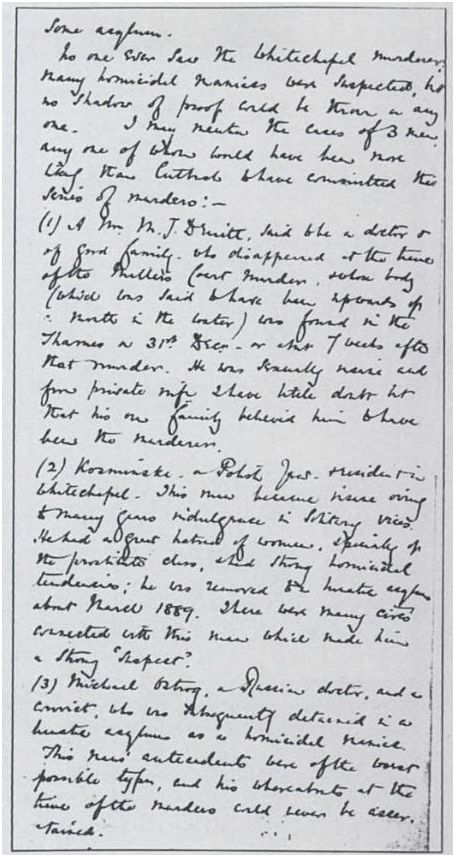
The 1894 memorandum written by Sir Melville Macnaghten, Assistant Chief Constable of the London Metropolitan Police, naming "Kosminski" as one of three suspects in the Jack the Ripper case. The other two suspects he named were Montague Druitt and Michael Ostrog.

Between 1888 and 1891, the deaths of 11 women in or around the Whitechapel district of the East End of London were linked in a single police investigation known as the "Whitechapel murders". Seven of the victims suffered a slash to the throat, and in four cases the bodies were mutilated after death. Five of the cases, between August and November 1888, show such marked similarities that they are generally agreed to be the work of a single serial killer, known as "Jack the Ripper". Despite an extensive police investigation, the Ripper was never identified, and the crimes remained unsolved. Years after the end of the murders, documents were discovered that revealed the suspicions of police officials against a man referred to as "Kosminski".

An 1894 memorandum written by Sir Melville Macnaghten, the Assistant Chief Constable of the London Metropolitan Police, names one of the suspects as a Polish Jew called "Kosminski" (without a forename). Macnaghten's memo was discovered in the private papers of his daughter, Lady Aberconway, by television journalist Dan Farson in 1959, and an abridged version from the archives of the Metropolitan Police was released to the public in the 1970s. Macnaghten stated that there were strong reasons for suspecting "Kosminski" because he "had a great hatred of women ... with strong homicidal tendencies".

In 1910, Assistant Commissioner Sir Robert Anderson claimed in his memoirs The Lighter Side of My Official Life that the Ripper was a "low-class Polish Jew". Chief Inspector Donald Swanson, who led the Ripper investigation, named the man as "Kosminski" in notes handwritten in the margin of his presentation copy of Anderson's memoirs. He added that "Kosminski" had been watched at his brother's home in Whitechapel by the police, that he was taken with his hands tied behind his back to the workhouse and then to Colney Hatch Asylum, and that he died shortly after. The copy of Anderson's memoirs containing the handwritten notes by Swanson was donated by his descendants to New Scotland Yard's Crime Museum in 2006.

In 1987, Ripper author Martin Fido searched asylum records for any inmates called Kosminski, and found only one: Aaron Kosminski. At the time of the murders, Aaron apparently lived either on Providence Street or Greenfield Street, both of which are close to the sites of the murders. The addresses given in the asylum records are in Mile End Old Town, just on the edge of Whitechapel. The description of Aaron Kosminski's symptoms in the case notes indicates that he had paranoid schizophrenia. Macnaghten's notes say that "Kosminski" indulged in "solitary vices", and in his memoirs Anderson wrote of his suspect's "unmentionable vices", both of which may match the claim in the case notes that Aaron Kosminski committed "self-abuse". Swanson's notes match the known details of Aaron Kosminski's life in that he reported that the suspect went to the workhouse and then to Colney Hatch, but the last detail about his early death does not match Aaron Kosminski, who lived until 1919 (see below).

Anderson claimed that the Ripper had been identified by the "only person who had ever had a good view of the murderer", but that no prosecution was possible because both the witness and the culprit were Jews and Jews were not willing to offer testimony against fellow Jews. Swanson's notes state that "Kosminski" was identified at "the Seaside Home". It has been suggested that this was the Police Convalescent Home in Hove near Brighton, though other possibilities have been proposed. Some authors express scepticism that this identification ever happened, while others use it as evidence for their theories. For example, Donald Rumbelow thought the story unlikely, but fellow Ripper authors Martin Fido and Paul Begg thought there was another witness, perhaps Israel Schwartz, Joseph Lawende, or a policeman. In his memorandum, however, Macnaghten stated that "no-one ever saw the Whitechapel murderer", which directly contradicts Anderson's and Swanson's recollection. Sir Henry Smith, Acting Commissioner of the City of London Police at the time of the murders, scathingly dismissed Anderson's claim that Jews would not testify against one another in his own memoirs written later in the same year, calling it a "reckless accusation" against Jews. Edmund Reid, the initial inspector in charge of the investigation, also challenged Anderson's opinion. There is no record of Aaron Kosminski in any surviving official police documents except Macnaghten's memo.

In Kosminski's defence, he was described as harmless in the asylum. He had originally been taken into custody for threatening either his sister or the sister of a witness to his admittance with a knife, and brandished a chair at an asylum attendant in January 1892, but these two incidents are the only known indications of violent behaviour. In the asylum, Kosminski preferred to speak his native language, Yiddish, which indicates that his English may have been poor, and that he was unable to persuade English-speaking victims into dark alleyways, as the Ripper was supposed to do. However, the "canonical five" killings that are most frequently blamed on the Ripper concluded in 1888; Kosminski's movements were not restricted until 1891.

== DNA evidence claims ==
=== 2014 Louhelainen study ===
On 7 September 2014, Jari Louhelainen, an expert in historic DNA analysis, announced that he had been commissioned by British author Russell Edwards to study a shawl said to have been found with victim Catherine Eddowes and that he had extracted mitochondrial DNA that matches female line descendants of Eddowes, and mitochondrial DNA that matches female line descendants of Kosminski's sister from the shawl. Louhelainen stated: "The first strand of DNA showed a 99.2 percent match, as the analysis instrument could not determine the sequence of the missing 0.8 percent fragment of DNA. On testing the second strand, we achieved a perfect 100 percent match."

In his book Naming Jack The Ripper, Edwards names Kosminski as Jack the Ripper. Edwards was inspired to try to solve the case after the release of From Hell, the 2001 Johnny Depp film about the Whitechapel murders. He bought the shawl at auction and commissioned Louhelainen, with Dr. David Miller assisting, to analyse it for forensic DNA evidence. Edwards states that Kosminski was on a list of police suspects, but there was never enough evidence to bring him to trial at the time. Kosminski died at the age of 53 of gangrene of the leg in a London mental hospital in 1919. He said that the DNA samples proved that Kosminski was "definitely, categorically, and absolutely" the person responsible for the Whitechapel murders committed by Jack the Ripper. He told The Independent, "I've got the only piece of forensic evidence in the whole history of the case." He continued, "I've spent 14 years working on it, and we have definitively solved the mystery of who Jack the Ripper was. Only non-believers that want to perpetuate the myth will doubt. This is it now—we have unmasked him."

Criticism of the report included complaints that the findings first appeared in Britain's tabloid Daily Mail newspaper. One critic, Susannah L. Bodman of The Oregonian, said, "The Daily Mail's reporting on science and scientific evidence is—let's say—not known to be robust." Other criticisms include questions about "the chain of evidence or provenance on the shawl", that publishing the information in the press "is not the same as reporting and publishing your methods in a peer-reviewed journal", and concerns regarding the entire recent body of Jack the Ripper investigative and historical forensic work in general, notably how often the work of mediums and clairvoyants, human interest angles, recycled evidence from coroner's courts and other sources, and the general acceptance of misinformation and urban myth as fact have undermined and hobbled previous efforts to conduct objective, scientific investigations.

Professor Alec Jeffreys, the forensic scientist who invented DNA fingerprinting in 1984, initially commented that the find was "an interesting but remarkable claim that needs to be subjected to peer review, with detailed analysis of the provenance of the shawl and the nature of the claimed DNA match with the perpetrator's descendants and its power of discrimination". Jeffreys and others later stated that a claim presented in the book as a statistically significant match with the DNA from Eddowes's descendant—a sequence variation described as 314.1C and claimed to be rare—was the result of an error in nomenclature for the common sequence variation 315.1C, which is present in more than 99% of people of European descent.

The shawl is said to have been found at the site of the murder of Catherine Eddowes and to have been passed down in the family of Amos Simpson, who was a police officer at the time of the murder. According to the family tradition, first recorded in 1988 – 100 years after the murder – Amos Simpson obtained the shawl after discovering Catherine Eddowes's body. This is certainly incorrect, as the body was discovered by PC Edward Watkins. The murder took place in the City of London, which had its own police force, separate from the Metropolitan Police. The subsequent events were recorded at the inquest, including the names of the other police officers who attended the scene, and no officers from other forces were mentioned. Amos Simpson was a Metropolitan Police officer, and in 1888 he was stationed in Cheshunt in Hertfordshire, about 14 miles from the scene of the murder.

As former City of London Police officer and crime historian Donald Rumbelow has noted, following the discovery of Catherine Eddowes's body, the police compiled a complete inventory of the clothing and other items found on the body, including descriptions of each garment and notes of bloodstains. It did not include any item resembling the shawl.

Mitochondrial DNA expert Peter Gill said the shawl "is of dubious origin and has been handled by several people who could have shared that mitochondrial DNA profile". The shawl or other material could have been contaminated before or while DNA was being tested; two of Eddowes's descendants are known to have been in the same room as the shawl for three days in 2007, and in the words of one critic, "The shawl has been openly handled by loads of people and been touched, breathed on, spat upon". Despite the criticisms, Louhelainen continued to defend his work.

=== 2019 Louhelainen study ===
Louhelainen's 2014 findings were criticised as they had not been subject to peer review by other scientists or investigators. In March 2019, the Journal of Forensic Sciences published a study analysing the mitochondrial DNA from cells extracted from a shawl claimed to have been found near the body of victim Catherine Eddowes, as well as samples from maternal relations of the victim and suspect (Kosminski). This study, conducted by scientists at Liverpool John Moores University and the University of Leeds, stated in its conclusion that "the presence of mtDNA on the shawl matches the female victim's mtDNA derived from stains on it and that mtDNA also on the shawl matches the suspect candidate's mtDNA"; however, Figure 7 of the same paper shows two differences between the suspect candidate's mtDNA sequence and the sequence obtained from the shawl, and in their conclusion the authors state, "According to the SWGDAM 2013 guidelines, if samples have two or more nucleotide position differences, they can be excluded as coming from the same source or maternal lineage, except when heteroplasmy is encountered." There is no suggestion that heteroplasmy is present. The journal later printed an expression of concern after the study was criticised and the authors were unable to produce the original data.

Russell Edwards tried unsuccessfully to get permission to exhume Aaron Kosminski's body in 2012, before the publication of his book, and again in 2016. He then applied unsuccessfully for a new inquest to be held on Catherine Eddowes in 2019 and again in 2021. In 2025 it was reported that Edwards and his legal team were seeking a new inquest for a third time. This aim has been supported by living descendants of Catherine Eddowes and one relation of Aaron Kosminski.

== Kosminski and "David Cohen" ==
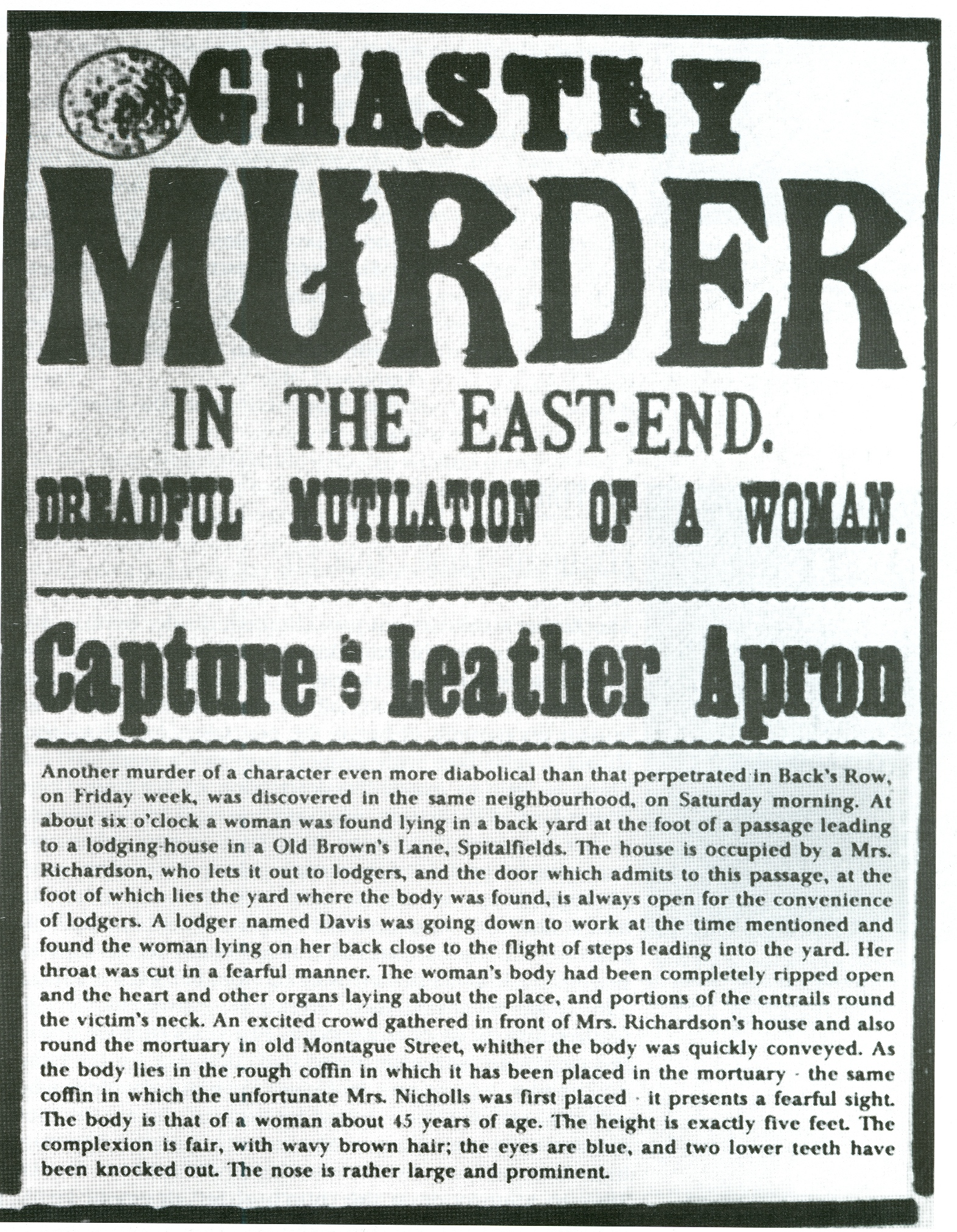
Newspaper broadsheet referring to the Whitechapel murderer as "Leather Apron", September 1888

Another Polish Jew proposed as a suspect in the Jack the Ripper murders was Aaron Davis Cohen or David Cohen, whose incarceration at Colney Hatch Lunatic Asylum roughly coincided with the end of the murders. He was committed on 12 December 1888, about one month after the murder of Mary Jane Kelly on 9 November. He was described as violently antisocial, exhibited destructive tendencies while at the asylum, and had to be restrained. He was the same age as Kosminski, and died at the asylum in October 1889. Author Martin Fido suggested in his book The Crimes, Detection and Death of Jack the Ripper (1987) that the name "David Cohen" was used by the asylum as a simple name for an inmate whose true name (Kosminski or Kaminsky) was too difficult to spell or easily misunderstood. Fido identified Cohen with "Leather Apron", a Polish Jewish bootmaker blamed for the murders in local gossip, and speculated that Cohen's true identity was Nathan Kaminsky, a bootmaker living in Whitechapel who had been treated at one time for syphilis. Fido was unable to trace Kaminsky after May 1888, and records of Cohen began that December. Fido suggested that police officials confused the name Kaminsky with Kosminski, resulting in the wrong man coming under suspicion. As with Kosminski, the asylum case notes say he spoke only Yiddish.

The implication is that Kaminsky's syphilis was not cured in May 1888 but in remission, and he began to kill prostitutes as an act of revenge because it had affected his brain. However, Cohen's death certificate makes no mention of syphilis but gives the cause of death as "exhaustion of mania" with phthisis, a then prevalent form of pulmonary tuberculosis, as the secondary cause. Kaminsky might have died as an "unknown" as hundreds of people did each year in the late 19th century. That would account for Fido's inability to find a record of his death in England and Wales during the probable period of his life.

Nigel Cawthorne dismissed Cohen as a likely suspect because in the asylum his assaults were undirected, and his behaviour was wild and uncontrolled, whereas the Ripper seemed to attack specifically and quietly. In contrast, former FBI criminal profiler John Douglas said in his 2000 book The Cases That Haunt Us that behavioural clues gathered from the murders all point to a person "known to the police as David Cohen ... or someone very much like him".

== See also ==
- Joseph Silver
