= Joseph Lawende =

Witness in the Jack the Ripper case (1847–1925)

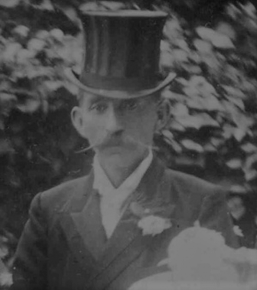
- Lawende, pictured in 1899
- Born: 9 February 1847; Warsaw, Congress Poland
- Died: 9 January 1925 (aged 77); Islington, London, England
- Occupation: Cigarette salesman
- Known for: Witness to a murder by Jack the Ripper
- Spouse: Annie Lowenthal (m. 1873)
- Children: 12

Joseph Lawende (9 February 1847 – 9 January 1925) was a Polish-born British cigarette maker and salesman who is believed to have witnessed serial killer Jack the Ripper in the company of his fourth victim, Catherine Eddowes, approximately nine minutes before the discovery of her body on 30 September 1888.

Lawende provided a detailed description of the Ripper to investigators; he was later described by the Assistant Commissioner of the Metropolitan Police, Robert Anderson, as "the only person who ever had a good view of the murderer."

== Biography ==
Lawende was born in Warsaw, Poland (then in the Russian Empire), to Jewish parents Hersch "Henry" Lawende and Zirle Lawende. He came to Britain in 1871, and was married to Annie Lowenthal in a London synagogue on 22 January 1873. His brother Leopold had married Annie's sister Fanny the previous year. He and his wife would have twelve children. At the time of his marriage, he was a cigarette maker living at 3 Tenter Street South.

On 11 December 1876, Lawende gave evidence at the Old Bailey at the trial of Isaac Marks for the murder of Frederick Barnard. He was described as a cigarette maker of 3 Lenton Street, Goodman's Fields. He had known Marks for a year as a customer of the Camperdown Hotel, where he dined on Sundays, and had also played dominoes with him. He gave evidence regarding the accused's strange behaviour.

In 1881, he is again listed as a cigarette maker, with his family living on 2 Tenter Street South. Around 1885, he moved to 45 Norfolk Road in Dalston. He is also known to have had commercial premises for the manufacture of cigarettes in St Mary Axe.

== Mitre Square ==
In the early morning hours of 30 September 1888, two murders attributed to Jack the Ripper took place. The second victim, Catherine Eddowes, was murdered in Mitre Square. That night, Lawende and two Jewish companions, Joseph Hyam Levy, a butcher, and Henry Harris, a furniture dealer, attended the Imperial Club in Duke's Place. They were delayed from leaving by rain. After the rain subsided, they left just after 1:30 a.m., the time having been checked by the club clock and by Lawende's pocket watch. They began to walk along Duke Street towards Aldgate.

Approximately fifteen yards from the club, at the narrow entrance to Church Passage, which led to Mitre Square, they saw a man and a woman talking in hushed tones. The woman had her hand on the man's chest, though not in a manner suggestive to Lawende as to her resisting him. Lawende would later identify the woman as Eddowes by her clothing when he was later shown her clothing at the mortuary.

Lawende walked slightly apart from his two friends, and was the only one to take any notice of the man's appearance, having glanced at him briefly from a distance of approximately nine feet (2.7 m). He described the man as being of average build and looking rather like a sailor, wearing a pepper-and-salt-coloured loose-fitting jacket, a grey cloth cap with a matching peak, and a reddish neckerchief. Lawende said that the man was aged about 30, with a fair complexion and moustache, being about 5 feet 7 inches (1.70 m) to 5 feet 8 inches (1.73 m) tall. He did not believe he would be able to identify the man again. The Times newspaper claimed that Lawende had said that the man was about 5 feet 9 inches (1.75 m) tall and was of a shabby appearance.

The Metropolitan Police clearly regarded Lawende as an important witness, because they kept him away from the press and, at the inquest into Eddowes' murder, City Solicitor Homewood Crawford said, "Unless the jury wish it, I have special reason for not giving details as to the appearance of this man" (i.e. the killer). The coroner agreed and Lawende merely provided a description of the man's clothes.

Major Henry Smith of the City of London Police, in whose area Eddowes had been killed, was impressed by the fact that Lawende was uninterested in the previous 'Ripper' murders, and would not be drawn with leading questions. Smith believed him to be a credible witness.

== Later life ==
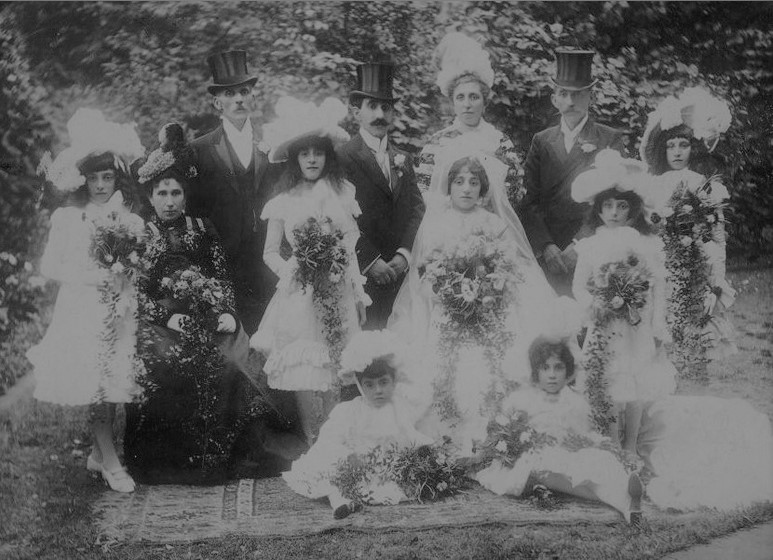
Joseph Lawende (upper right), pictured at the wedding of his daughter Rose in 1899

Lawende was naturalised as a British citizen in April 1889. According to the 1891 census, by 1891 Lawende and his wife Annie and their children (all of whom up to that point had been born in Whitechapel) had moved to Islington and Lawende had anglicised his name to Lavender, a spelling which is continued in the 1901 census. In September 1894, when the birth of his daughter Ruby was announced in The Jewish Chronicle, the family had moved to 116 Mildmay Road, Mildmay Park.

There are two known photographs of Lawende/Lavender. In 1899, he was photographed at the wedding of his daughter Rose, and the photograph was reproduced with the permission of a descendant. In 1923 Lawende/Lavender, was photographed seated for a portrait with his family. This photograph was reproduced for the first time in the online magazine Ripperologist in its January 2008 issue.

Lawende died in London on 9 January 1925, a month shy of his 78th birthday. He and his wife were buried at East Ham Cemetery.

== Anderson and Swanson ==
Lawende has been identified by some Ripperologists as the witness described by Robert Anderson of Scotland Yard as "the only person who ever had a good view of the murderer." The annotations written by Chief Inspector Donald Swanson (the ‘Swanson Marginalia’) in his copy of Anderson's memoirs, The Lighter Side of My Official Life, published in 1910, states that the witness was a Jewish man who would not give evidence against the suspect, namely Kosminski, because it would have caused the death of a fellow Jew,

"...because the suspect was also a Jew and also because his evidence would convict the suspect, and witness would be the means of murderer being hanged which he did not wish to be left on his mind...And after this identification which suspect knew, no other murder of this kind took place in London...after the suspect had been identified at the Seaside Home where he had been sent by us with great difficulty in order to subject him to identification, and he knew he was identified. On suspect's return to his brother's house in Whitechapel he was watched by police (City CID) by day & night. In a very short time the suspect with his hands tied behind his back, he was sent to Stepney Workhouse and then to Colney Hatch and died shortly afterwards - Kosminski was the suspect - DSS"

However, neither Anderson nor Swanson actually name the witness, who could also be Israel Schwartz.

== Media portrayals ==
In the episode 'What Use Our Work' of the BBC One series Ripper Street (2013) Lawende/Lavender was played by Linal Haft.

== See also ==
- Cold case
- List of proposed Jack the Ripper suspects
- Unsolved murders in the United Kingdom

== Cited works and further reading ==
- Begg, Paul (2003). Jack the Ripper: The Definitive History. London: Pearson Education. ISBN 0-582-50631-X
- Begg, Paul (2004). Jack the Ripper: The Facts. Barnes & Noble Books. ISBN 978-0-760-77121-1
- Bell, Neil R. A. (2016). Capturing Jack the Ripper: In the Boots of a Bobby in Victorian England. Stroud: Amberley Publishing. ISBN 978-1-445-62162-3
- Cook, Andrew (2009). Jack the Ripper. Stroud, Gloucestershire: Amberley Publishing. ISBN 978-1-84868-327-3
- Eddleston, John J. (2002). Jack the Ripper: An Encyclopedia. London: Metro Books. ISBN 1-84358-046-2
- Evans, Stewart P.; Rumbelow, Donald (2006). Jack the Ripper: Scotland Yard Investigates. Stroud, Gloucestershire: Sutton Publishing. ISBN 0-7509-4228-2
- Evans, Stewart P.; Skinner, Keith (2000). The Ultimate Jack the Ripper Sourcebook: An Illustrated Encyclopedia. London: Constable and Robinson. ISBN 1-84119-225-2
- Evans, Stewart P.; Skinner, Keith (2001). Jack the Ripper: Letters from Hell. Stroud, Gloucestershire: Sutton Publishing. ISBN 0-7509-2549-3
- Fido, Martin (1987). The Crimes, Death and Detection of Jack the Ripper. Vermont: Trafalgar Square. ISBN 978-0-297-79136-2
- Gordon, R. Michael (2000). Alias Jack the Ripper: Beyond the Usual Whitechapel Suspects. North Carolina: McFarland Publishing. ISBN 978-0-786-40898-6
- Harris, Melvin (1994). The True Face of Jack the Ripper. London: Michael O'Mara Books Ltd. ISBN 978-1-854-79193-1
- Holmes, Ronald M.; Holmes, Stephen T. (2002). Profiling Violent Crimes: An Investigative Tool. Thousand Oaks, California: Sage Publications, Inc. ISBN 0-761-92594-5
- Honeycombe, Gordon (1982). The Murders of the Black Museum: 1870-1970. London: Bloomsbury Books. ISBN 978-0-863-79040-9
- Lynch, Terry; Davies, David (2008). Jack the Ripper: The Whitechapel Murderer. Hertfordshire: Wordsworth Editions. ISBN 978-1-840-22077-3
- Marriott, Trevor (2005). Jack the Ripper: The 21st Century Investigation. London: John Blake. ISBN 1-84454-103-7
- Rumbelow, Donald (2004). The Complete Jack the Ripper: Fully Revised and Updated. Penguin Books. ISBN 0-14-017395-1
- Rutt, Peter (2013). Jack the Ripper: From the Cradle to the Grave. Author House Publishing. ISBN 978-1-481-79895-2
- Sugden, Philip (2002). The Complete History of Jack the Ripper. Carroll & Graf Publishers. ISBN 0-7867-0276-1
- Waddell, Bill (1993). The Black Museum: New Scotland Yard. London: Little, Brown and Company. ISBN 978-0-316-90332-5
- Whittington-Egan, Richard; Whittington-Egan, Molly (1992). The Murder Almanac. Glasgow: Neil Wilson Publishing. ISBN 978-1-897-78404-4
- Whittington-Egan, Richard (2013). Jack the Ripper: The Definitive Casebook. Stroud: Amberley Publishing. ISBN 978-1-445-61768-8
- Wilson, Colin; Odell, Robin (1987) Jack the Ripper: Summing Up and Verdict. Bantam Press. ISBN 0-593-01020-5
