= Donald Swanson =

British police officer (1848–1924)

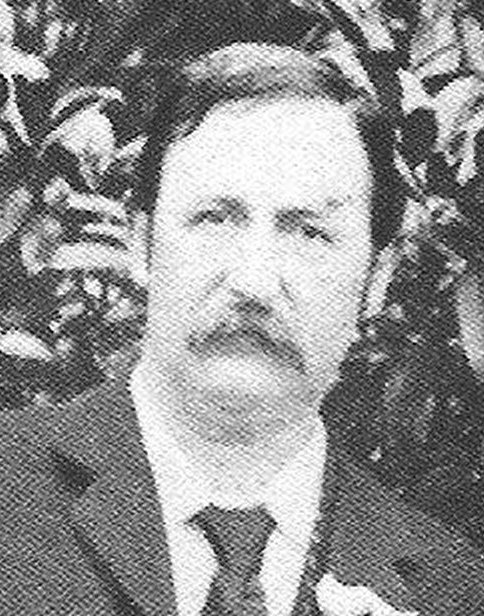
Chief Inspector Donald Swanson

Chief Inspector Donald Sutherland Swanson (12 August 1848 – 24 November 1924) was a senior police officer in the Metropolitan Police in London during the notorious Jack the Ripper murders of 1888.

== Early life ==
The son of John Swanson, a brewer, Swanson was born at Geise, where his father operated a distillery, before the family moved in 1851 to Thurso. Donald was a good scholar and on leaving school he worked for a period as a teacher, but realising that that career offered him few prospects, he decided instead to move to London, where two of his sisters had settled after marriage, and in 1867 found work as a city clerk. When his employer decided to retire from business early the following year Swanson spotted an advertisement in The Daily Telegraph by the Metropolitan Police appealing for new applicants.

== Police career ==
Swanson joined the Metropolitan Police on 27 April 1868, and was given the warrant number 50282. He married his wife Julia Ann Nevill (born in Hoxton in 1854 to a licensed victualler) on 23 May 1878 at All Saints Church, West Ham in Essex. By November 1887 Swanson was Chief Inspector of the CID in the Commissioner's Office at Scotland Yard. He was promoted to Superintendent in 1896. Swanson was involved in preventing Fenian terrorist attacks in London during the 1880s. Other cases he was involved in include recovering the stolen jewels of the Earl of Bective's wife and the stolen Portrait of Georgiana, Duchess of Devonshire by Thomas Gainsborough, as well as acting against 'rent boys', blackmailing homosexual prostitutes in 1897, and in preventing the Jameson Raid from starting a war in South Africa. He arrested Percy Lefroy Mapleton, the railway murderer, in 1881. Swanson retired in 1903.

Swanson died on 24 November 1924, aged 76, at 3 Presburg Road, New Malden, Surrey, where his wife also died eleven years later. They were both buried at Kingston Cemetery.

== Jack the Ripper ==
On 15 September 1888 Sir Charles Warren, the Commissioner of Police of the Metropolis, issued a memorandum to Dr. Robert Anderson, Assistant Commissioner of the Metropolitan Police and Chief of the Criminal Investigation Department (CID), placing Swanson in overall charge of the investigation into the 8 September murder of Annie Chapman in Hanbury Street, Spitalfields. Swanson was freed from all other duties and given his own office at Scotland Yard from which to coordinate inquiries. With his new assignment, he was given permission to see "every paper, every document, every report [and] every telegram" concerning the investigation. As subsequent murders were committed in the Whitechapel Murders series Swanson remained ‘in situ’ - gaining a cornucopia of knowledge and information about the killings.

== The 'Swanson Marginalia' ==
Although he declined to write his own memoirs following his retirement, Swanson did collect a small number of published reminiscences by his contemporaries. Among these were two books by his former superior, Dr. Robert Anderson, the Assistant Commissioner of Police - Criminals and Crime (1906) and The Lighter Side of My Official Life (1910). In the latter Swanson wrote pencilled notes, or annotations, which were discovered by his grandson, James Swanson, in 1981. In these notes Swanson names a "Kosminski" (widely thought to be Aaron Kosminski) as the Polish Jew that Anderson had hinted at in his book as being a suspect. Anderson wrote that the only person to get a close look at Jack the Ripper identified him "the moment he was confronted with him" but refused to testify. Swanson clarified this by writing -

"...because the suspect was also a Jew and also because his evidence would convict the suspect, and witness would be the means of murderer being hanged which he did not wish to be left on his mind...And after this identification which suspect knew, no other murder of this kind took place in London...after the suspect had been identified at the Seaside Home where he had been sent by us with difficulty in order to subject him to identification, and he knew he was identified. On suspect's return to his brother's house in Whitechapel he was watched by police (City CID) by day & night. In a very short time the suspect with his hands tied behind his back, he was sent to Stepney Workhouse and then to Colney Hatch and died shortly afterwards - Kosminski was the suspect - DSS"

While it is true that Aaron Kosminski lived with his brother in Whitechapel, and that he was an inmate at Colney Hatch, he in fact did not die shortly after being transferred there, as Swanson states; in fact, Kosminski died in 1919, and therefore was still alive when Swanson probably wrote his annotations. Nor is it likely that an identified and homicidal criminal would have been simply and quietly released into his brother's care. Also, by stating that after Kosminski's identification as the Whitechapel Murderer "no other murder of this kind took place in London" Swanson overlooks the series of Ripper-like killings that took place after Kosminski's incarceration, including that of Frances Coles in February 1891, only six days after Kosminski had been admitted to Colney Hatch, possibly inferring that he did not accept those murders as being by the same hand.

The identity of the Jewish witness is in doubt. As far as is known, there were two, Israel Schwartz and Joseph Lawende. Schwartz saw the third victim Elizabeth Stride being attacked at the place where fifteen minutes later her body was found, but he ran off when the attacker called out "Lipski", an antisemitic taunt of the time. Israel Lipski was a Jewish murderer who had been hanged in 1887 and some Gentiles had taken to insulting Jews by shouting his name at them. The implication, perhaps erroneous, is that Stride's attacker was an antisemitic Gentile and therefore not Kosminski. Lawende saw a man and woman together near Mitre Square, Aldgate, a few minutes before the fourth victim Catherine Eddowes was found there but told Swanson that he was doubtful he would recognise the man if he saw him again.

"Kosminski" is also mentioned in Sir Melville Macnaghten's Memoranda in a list of three individuals who were suspected of being the Ripper. Macnaghten, however, thought that Montague Druitt was more likely to be the killer, and he did not mention anything about any alleged identification of Kosminski that had been withdrawn by a witness. That was strange because Macnaghten was an Assistant Chief Constable in the Criminal Investigation Department and Anderson was in charge of that department. Aaron Kosminski was sent to Colney Hatch Asylum, via the Mile End Old Town asylum, in February 1891, and we may suppose that the identification at the "seaside home" took place a little earlier, perhaps in January of that year. Macnaghten went to Scotland Yard in 1889 and so would have been there when the identification took place, if it did indeed involve Aaron Kosminski. Quite obviously he was not told about it and, if Anderson was confident that Kosminski had been the Ripper, he would have thought that there was no reason for Macnaghten to compile his memorandum, speculating about the Ripper's identity. Of the three men suspected at the time of the murders, Macnaghten thought Druitt was the most likely but in 1972, two years before she died, Macnaghten's daughter Christabel, Lady Aberconway, told her friend Michael Thornton that in nominating Druitt her father was "only following the official line. The truth could make the throne totter." Thornton reported this in the Sunday Express in 1992.
