= Cutbush (surname) =

Cutbush is a surname. Notable people with the surname include:

- Edward Cutbush (1772–1843), surgeon, US Navy officer, professor of chemistry
- James Cutbush (1788–1823), American chemist
- John Cutbush (born 1949), English footballer
- John Cutbush (cricketer) (fl. 1740s), English cricketer
- Thomas Hayne Cutbush (1866–1903), London clerk, accused of being Jack the Ripper
