= Israel Schwartz =

Eyewitness to a murder attributed to Jack the Ripper

Israel Schwartz was a witness during the Whitechapel murders in 1888. He claimed to have witnessed an assault on a London woman on 30 September. The victim seen by Schwartz was identified as Elizabeth Stride, the third of the canonical five, potentially making Schwartz one of the few people who might have had a good look at Jack the Ripper.

== Background ==
During police questioning, Schwartz gave his address as 22 Ellen Street, located at Back Church Lane at the end of Berner Street (now Henriques Street). According to both police and journalists, Schwartz was a Jewish immigrant and spoke no or poor English. Police made no mention of his origin, describing him only as a foreigner, but a contemporary article of The Star referred to Schwartz as Hungarian. The same article says that Schwartz had recently moved and the night of the incident, he had been on his way to check if his wife had already arrived at the new lodgings.

=== Census records ===
The name Israel Schwartz appeared once in the 5 April 1891 census. The entry lists him as living on 22 Samuel Street, working as a tailor's presser and aged 27, with the birthplace Poland. The 31 March 1901 census subsequently lists an Israel Shwartz as living on 21 Jubilee Street, working as a provision dealer and aged 36, with the birthplace Russia. Both entries also registered a wife, Eva/Hava Serel Radzenovich, and children, initially two and later five. The birth records of the children spell the father's name as Ysral Schwatz, Israel Swartz, and Ysrael Schwartz.

The periodical Ripperologist wrote that the given information points towards Schwartz having been born in Russian Empire-controlled Congress Poland, but spending a significant amount of time in Austrian Galicia, a majority Polish region under Austria-Hungary, prior to emigrating to England. He may have given his origin as Hungarian rather than Polish due to negative attitudes towards Polish Jews in London at the time.

== Schwartz's statement ==
On the evening of 30 September, Schwartz appeared at Leman Street police station. His testimony was made through a friend acting as a translator.

In the early morning of 30 September, at around 12:45 am, Schwartz had walked down Commercial Road (mistakenly transcribed as Commercial Street) and turned into Berner Street when he saw a man stop and speak to a woman who was standing in the gateway of Dutfield's Yard. Schwartz stated that the man then threw the woman to the ground. Schwartz crossed the street and reported seeing another man smoking a pipe on this side. The attacker turned to Schwartz and the other man, calling out the name "Lipski", after which the pipe smoking man started walking behind Schwartz, prompting him to run away. Schwartz told The Star that he saw a knife in the second man's hand, but told police only of a pipe.

=== Descriptions ===
Schwartz described the possible murderer as being around thirty years old with a height of around 5 feet 5 inches (1.65 m), fair complexion, dark hair, small brown moustache, with a full face and broad shouldered. He wore a dark jacket, trousers, and a black peaked cap, holding nothing in his hands.

Schwartz also described the second man, the pipe smoker, as around 35 years old with a height of around 5 feet 11 inches (1.80 m), "fresh" complexion, light brown hair and moustache. He wore a dark overcoat and a black wide-brimmed hard felt hat, holding a clay pipe in one hand. Schwartz was unable to say whether the attacker and the pipe smoker knew each other or had been working together.

On 5 October, a local man, William Marshall of 64 Berner Street, gave similar descriptions of a woman and a man, the latter also wearing a coat, trousers and peaked cap of dark colour, walking towards Dutfield's Yard between 11:30 pm and 11:45 pm. Constable William Smith, whose patrol route passed through Berner Street, also said he saw a couple loitering in front of Dutfield's Yard at 12:35 am. A passerby, James Brown of 35 Fairclough Street, said he saw a woman and a man of the same description kissing opposite of Dutfield's Yard between 12:35 and 12:45 am. All described the man as wearing a dark coat and trousers, though Marshall and Brown said that he wore a peaked cap, while Smith described it as a deerstalker.

=== "Lipski" ===
According to Chief Inspector Frederick Abberline, the term "Lipski" is believed to have been an antisemitic insult local to the Whitechapel district, related to Israel Lipski's murder of his lessor Miriam Angel the year before. The murder had occurred in Angel's residence on Batty Street, which was parallel to Berner Street. A different explanation was that the utterance was not the name Lipski, but rather a misheard command directed at the pipe smoking man to follow Schwartz.

=== Connection to the Jack the Ripper case ===
At 1:00 am, around 15 minutes after Schwartz's reported encounter, the body of Elizabeth Stride was found at Dutfield's Yard. That same day Schwartz identified Stride's body as that of the woman he had seen attacked and gave testimony to the police about what he had seen. Marshall and Brown also identified Stride as the woman they had seen earlier in the night.

Several years after the crimes, Commissioner Robert Anderson claimed in his autobiography The Lighter Side of My Official Life that the Ripper had been identified by "the only person who ever had a good view of the murderer." Chief Inspector Donald Swanson, in marginalia found in his personal copy of Anderson's book, stated that the witness in question was Jewish. Some Ripperologists have concluded that Schwartz was most likely the man being referred to, although a number of other people, primarily Joseph Lawende, have also been suggested. Swanson speculated that the witness had identified but then refused to testify against "Kosminski"—understood to be Aaron Kosminski, a Jewish barber—because it would likely have caused the death of a fellow Jew. This speculation has never been verified.

== Bibliography ==
- Shellenberger, Kyli Lynn (1 April 2003). Edmonds, Anthony (ed.). Unsolved Mysteries: The Identity of Jack the Ripper and His Century-Long Legacy (PDF) (Honors thesis). Muncie, Indiana: Ball State University.

== See also ==
- List of proposed Jack the Ripper suspects
