= Montague Druitt =

English barrister, schoolteacher, cricketer, and Jack the Ripper suspect (1857–1888)

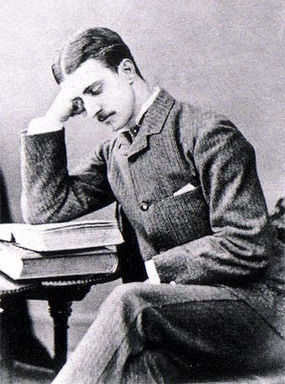
- Druitt c. 1879
- Born: 15 August 1857; Wimborne Minster, Dorset, England
- Died: Early December 1888 (aged 31)
- Body discovered: River Thames, near Thornycroft's torpedo works, Chiswick, on 31 December 1888
- Resting place: Wimborne Cemetery
- Education: New College, Oxford (BA); Inner Temple
- Occupations: Teacher and barrister
- Employer(s): George Valentine's school, Blackheath
- Known for: Suspect in the Jack the Ripper murders

Montague John Druitt (15 August 1857 – early December 1888) was an English barrister and educator who is known for being a suspect in the Jack the Ripper murders of 1888.

Druitt came from an upper-middle-class English background, and studied at Winchester College and the University of Oxford. After graduating, he was employed as an assistant schoolmaster at a boarding school and pursued a parallel career in the law, qualifying as a barrister in 1885. His main interest outside work was cricket, which he played with many leading players of the time, including Lord Harris and Francis Lacey.

In November 1888, Druitt lost his post at the school for reasons that remain unclear. One month later his body was discovered drowned in the River Thames. His death, which was found to be a suicide, roughly coincided with the end of the murders attributed to Jack the Ripper. Private suggestions in the 1890s that he could have committed the crimes became public knowledge in the 1960s and led to the publication of books that proposed him as the murderer. The evidence against him was entirely circumstantial, however, and many writers from the 1970s onwards have rejected him as a likely suspect.

== Early life ==
Montague Druitt was born in Wimborne Minster, Dorset, England. He was the second son and third child of prominent local surgeon William Druitt, and his wife Ann (née Harvey). William Druitt was a justice of the peace, a governor of the local grammar school, and a regular worshipper at the local Anglican church, the Minster. Six weeks after his birth, Montague Druitt was christened at the Minster by his maternal great-uncle, Reverend William Mayo. The Druitts lived at Westfield House, which was the largest house in the town, and set in its own grounds with stables and servants' cottages. Druitt had six brothers and sisters, including an elder brother William who entered the law, and a younger brother Edward who joined the Royal Engineers.

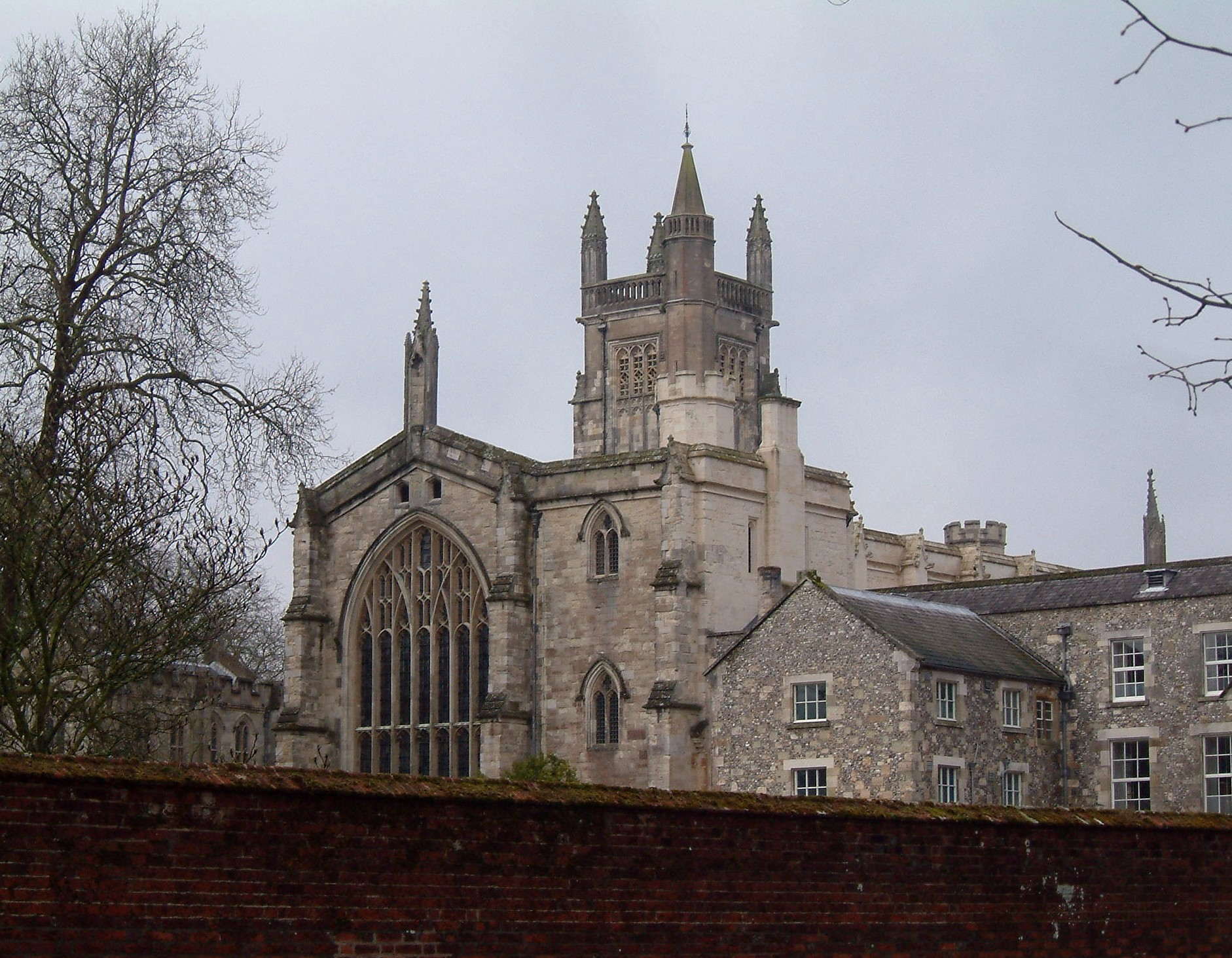
Winchester College Chapel

Druitt was educated at Winchester College, where he won a scholarship at the age of 13, and excelled at sports, especially cricket and fives. He was active in the school's debating society, an interest that might have spawned his desire to become a barrister. In debates, he spoke in favour of French republicanism, compulsory military service, and the resignation of Benjamin Disraeli, and against the Ottoman Empire, the influence of Otto von Bismarck, and the conduct of the government in the Tichborne case. He defended William Wordsworth as "a bulwark of Protestantism", and condemned the execution of King Charles I as "a most dastardly murder that will always attach to England's fair name as a blot". In a light-hearted debate, he spoke against the proposition that bondage to fashion is a social evil.

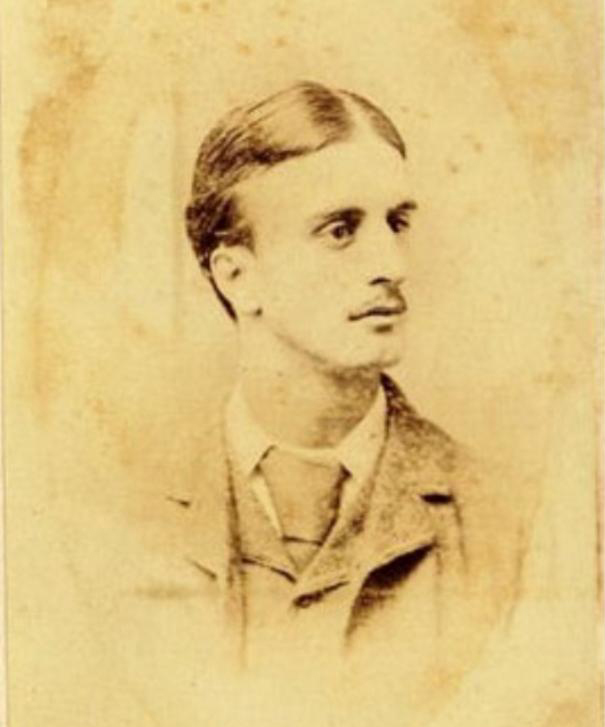
Druitt c. 1875–76

In his final year at Winchester, 1875–76, Druitt was Prefect of Chapel, treasurer of the debating society, school fives champion, and opening bowler for the cricket team. In June 1876, he played cricket for the school team against Eton College, which won the match with a team including cricketing luminaries Ivo Bligh and Kynaston Studd, as well as a future Principal Private Secretary at the Home Office Evelyn Ruggles-Brise. Druitt bowled out Studd for four. With a glowing academic record, he was awarded a Winchester Scholarship to New College, Oxford.

At New College, Druitt was popular with his peers and was elected Steward of the Junior Common Room. He played cricket and rugby for the college team, and was the winner of both double and single fives at the university in 1877. In a seniors' cricket match in 1880, he bowled out William Patterson, who later captained Kent County Cricket Club.

Druitt gained a second class in Classical Moderations in 1878 and graduated with a third class Bachelor of Arts degree in Literae Humaniores (Classics) in 1880. His youngest brother, Arthur, entered New College in 1882, just as Druitt was following in his eldest brother William's footsteps by embarking on a career in law.

== Career ==
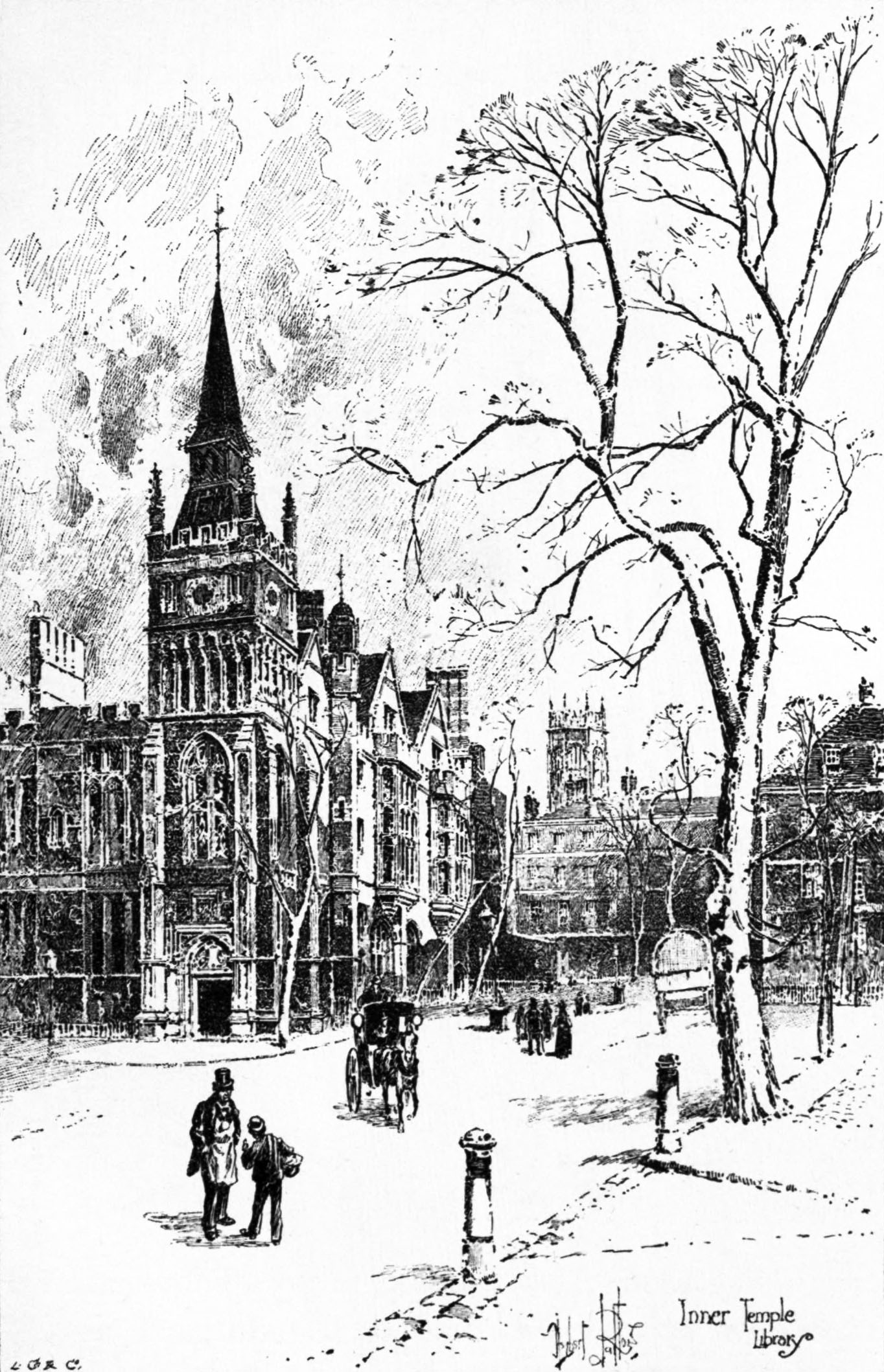
The Inner Temple, 1895 Sketch by Herbert Railton

On 17 May 1882, two years after graduation, Druitt was admitted to the Inner Temple, one of the qualifying bodies for English barristers. His father had promised him a legacy of £500 (equivalent to £52,000 today), and Druitt paid his membership fees with a loan from his father secured against the inheritance. He was called to the bar on 29 April 1885, and set up a practice as a barrister and special pleader.

Druitt's father died suddenly from a heart attack in September 1885, leaving an estate valued at £16,579 (equivalent to £1,842,000 today). In a codicil, Druitt senior instructed his executors to deduct the money he had advanced to his son from the legacy of £500. Montague received very little money, if any, from his father's will, although he did receive some of his father's personal possessions. Most of Dr. Druitt's estate went to his wife Ann, three unmarried daughters (Georgiana, Edith and Ethel), and eldest son William.

Druitt rented barristers' chambers at 9 King's Bench Walk in the Inner Temple. In the late Victorian era, only the wealthy could afford legal action and only one in eight qualified barristers was able to make a living from the law. While some of Druitt's biographers claim his practice did not flourish, others suppose that it provided him with a relatively substantial income on the basis of his costly lease of chambers and the value of his estate at death. He is listed in the Law List of 1886 as active in the Western Circuit and Winchester Sessions, and for 1887 in the Western Circuit and Hampshire, Portsmouth, and Southampton Assizes.

To supplement his income and help pay for his legal training, Druitt worked as an assistant schoolmaster at George Valentine's boarding school, 9 Eliot Place, Blackheath, London, from 1880. The school had a long and distinguished history; Benjamin Disraeli had been a pupil there in the 1810s, and boys from the school had been playmates of a younger son of Queen Victoria, Prince Arthur, Duke of Connaught, who as a boy in the 1860s had lived nearby at Greenwich Park. Druitt's post came with accommodation in Eliot Place, and the long school holidays gave him time to study the law and to pursue his interest in cricket.

== Cricket ==
In Dorset, Druitt played for the Kingston Park Cricket Club and the Dorset County Cricket Club. He was particularly noted for his skill as a bowler. In 1882 and 1883 he toured the West Country with a gentleman's touring team called the Incogniti. One of Druitt's fellow local players was Francis Lacey, the first man knighted for services to cricket. Druitt played for another wandering team, the Butterflies, on 14 June 1883, when they drew against his alma mater Winchester College. The team included first-class cricketers A. J. Webbe, J. G. Crowdy, John Frederick, and Charles Seymour.

While working at Blackheath, Druitt joined the local cricket club, Blackheath Morden, and became the club's treasurer. It was a well-connected club: the president was politician Sir Charles Mills and one of its players was Stanley Christopherson, who later became president of the Marylebone Cricket Club. After the merger of the club with other local sports associations to form the Blackheath Cricket, Football and Lawn Tennis Company, Druitt took on the additional roles of company secretary and director.

The inaugural game of the new club was played against George Gibbons Hearne's Eleven, which included many members of the famous cricketing Hearne family. Hearne's team won by 21 runs. On 5 June 1886, in a match between Blackheath and a gentleman's touring team called the Band of Brothers, led by Lord Harris, Druitt bowled Harris for 14 and took three other wickets. Blackheath won by 178 runs. Two weeks later, he dismissed England batsman John Shuter, who was playing for Bexley Cricket Club, for a duck, and Blackheath won the game by 114 runs. The following year, Shuter returned to Blackheath with Surrey County, a team that included Walter Read, William Lockwood, and Bobby Abel, whom Druitt bowled out for 56. Surrey won by 147 runs.

On 26 May 1884, Druitt was elected to the Marylebone Cricket Club (MCC) on the recommendation of his fellow Butterflies player Charles Seymour, who proposed him, and noted fielder Vernon Royle, who seconded his nomination. One of the minor matches he played for MCC was with England bowler William Attewell against Harrow School on 10 June 1886. The MCC won by 57 runs. Druitt also played against MCC for Blackheath: on 23 July 1887, he bowled out Dick Pougher for 28 runs, but he only made 5 runs before bowled out by Arnold Fothergill with a ball caught by Pougher. The MCC won by 52 runs.

In June 1888, Lord Harris played twice for Blackheath with Druitt and Stanley Christopherson; Blackheath won both matches easily, but Druitt was out of form and contributed neither runs nor wickets in either match. In August 1888, Druitt played for the Gentlemen of Bournemouth against the Parsees cricket team during their tour of England, and took five wickets in the visitors' first innings. Nevertheless, the Parsees won. On 8 September 1888, the Blackheath Club played against the Christopherson brothers. Druitt was bowled out by Stanley Christopherson, who was playing with his brothers instead of for Blackheath, and in reply Druitt bowled out Christopherson. Blackheath won by 22 runs.

In addition to cricket, Druitt also played field hockey.

== Death ==
On Friday 30 November 1888, Druitt was dismissed from his post at the Blackheath boys' school. The reason for his dismissal is unclear. One newspaper, quoting his brother William's inquest testimony, reported that he was dismissed because he "had got into serious trouble" but did not specify any further. In early December 1888 he disappeared, and on 21 December the Blackheath Cricket Club's minute book records that he was removed as treasurer and secretary in the belief that he had "gone abroad".

On 31 December 1888, Druitt's body was found floating in the River Thames, off Thornycroft's torpedo works, Chiswick, by a waterman named Henry Winslade. Stones in Druitt's pockets had kept his body submerged for about a month. He was in possession of a return train ticket to Hammersmith dated 1 December, a silver watch, a cheque for £50 and £16 in gold (equivalent to £5,600 and £1,800 today). It is not known why he should have carried such a large amount of money, but it could have been a final payment from the school.

Some modern authors suggest that Druitt was dismissed because he was a homosexual or pederast and that may have driven him to suicide. One speculation is that the money found on his body was going to be used for payment to a blackmailer. Others, however, think that there is no evidence of homosexuality and that his suicide was instead precipitated by a hereditary psychiatric illness. His mother suffered from depression and was institutionalised from July 1888. She died in an asylum in Chiswick in 1890. His maternal grandmother committed suicide while insane, his aunt attempted suicide, and his eldest sister committed suicide in old age. A note written by Druitt and addressed to his brother William, who was a solicitor in Bournemouth, was found in Druitt's room in Blackheath. It read, "Since Friday I felt that I was going to be like mother, and the best thing for me was to die."

As was usual in the district, the inquest was held at the Lamb Tap public house, Chiswick, by the coroner Dr Thomas Bramah Diplock, on 2 January 1889. The coroner's jury concluded that Druitt had committed suicide by drowning while in an unsound state of mind. He was buried in Wimborne Cemetery the next day. At probate, his estate was valued at £2,600 (equivalent to £292,200 today).

It is not known why Druitt committed suicide in Chiswick. One suggested link is that one of his university friends, Thomas Seymour Tuke of the Tuke family, lived there. Tuke was a psychiatric doctor with whom Druitt played cricket, and Druitt's mother was committed to Tuke's asylum in 1890. Another suggestion is that Druitt knew Harry Wilson, whose house, "The Osiers", lay between Hammersmith station and Thornycroft's wharf, where Druitt's body was found.

== Jack the Ripper suspect ==
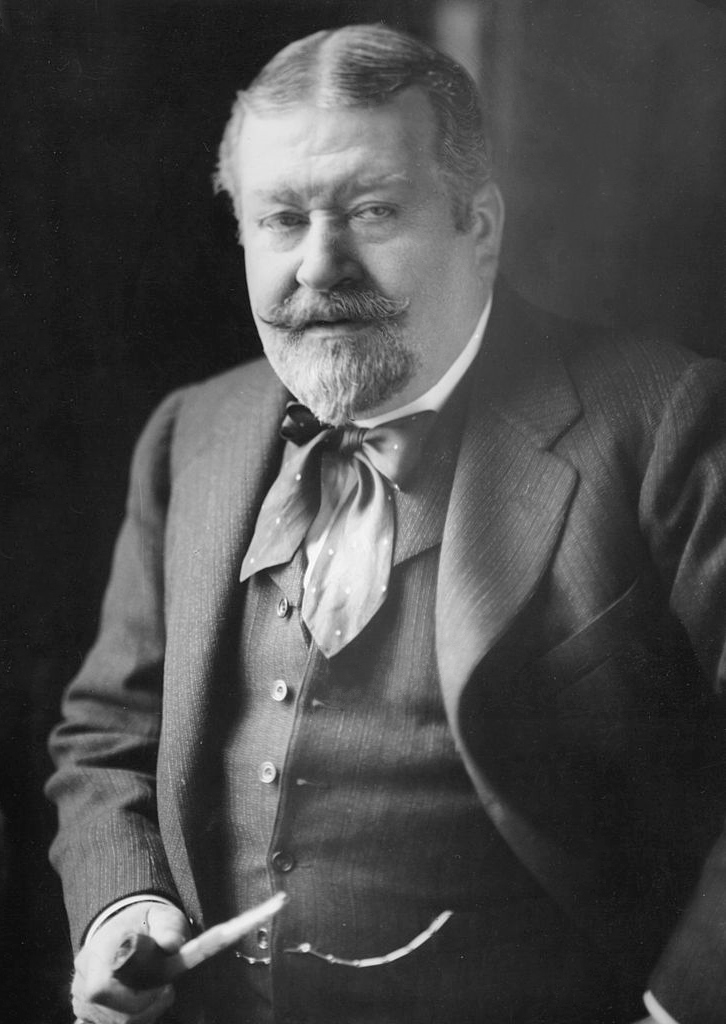
George R. Sims appears to identify Druitt with the Ripper, albeit obliquely, in his autobiography.

On 31 August 1888, Mary Ann Nichols was found murdered in the impoverished Whitechapel district in the East End of London, with her throat slashed. During September, three more women (Annie Chapman on the 8th, and Elizabeth Stride and Catherine Eddowes on the 30th) were found dead with their throats cut. On 9 November 1888, the body of Mary Jane Kelly was discovered. Her throat had been severed down to the spine. In four of the cases the bodies were mutilated after death. The similarities between the crimes led to the supposition that they were committed by the same assailant, who was given the nickname "Jack the Ripper". Despite an extensive police investigation into the five murders, the Ripper was never identified and the crimes remain unsolved.

Shortly after Kelly's murder, stories that the Ripper had drowned in the Thames began to circulate. In February 1891, the member of parliament for West Dorset, Henry Richard Farquharson, announced that Jack the Ripper was "the son of a surgeon" who had committed suicide on the night of the last murder. Although Farquharson did not name his suspect, the description resembles Druitt. Farquharson lived 10 miles (16 km) from the Druitt family and was part of the same social class. The Victorian journalist George R. Sims noted in his memoirs, The Mysteries of Modern London (1906): "[the Ripper's] body was found in the Thames after it had been in the river for about a month". Similar comments were made by Sir John Moylan, Assistant Under-Secretary of the Home Office: "[the Ripper] escaped justice by committing suicide at the end of 1888" and Sir Basil Thomson, made Assistant Commissioner of the CID in 1913: "[the Ripper was] an insane Russian doctor [who] escaped arrest by committing suicide in the Thames at the end of 1888". Neither Moylan nor Thomson was involved in the Ripper investigation.

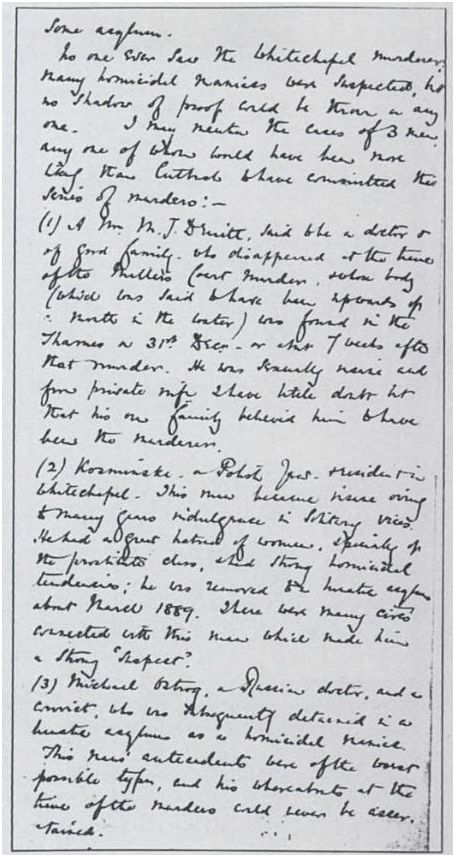
A page from Melville Macnaghten's 1894 memorandum in which Druitt and two other suspects in the Jack the Ripper murders are named

Assistant Chief Constable Sir Melville Macnaghten named Druitt as a suspect in the case in a private handwritten memorandum of 23 February 1894. Macnaghten highlighted the coincidence between Druitt's disappearance and death shortly after the last of the five murders on 9 November 1888, and claimed to have unspecified "private information" that left "little doubt" Druitt's own family believed him to have been the murderer. Macnaghten's memo was eventually discovered in his personal papers by his daughter, Lady Aberconway, who showed them to British broadcaster Dan Farson. A slightly different abridged copy of the memo found in the Metropolitan Police archive was released to the public in 1966. Farson first revealed Druitt's initials "MJD" in a television programme in November 1959.

In 1961, Farson investigated a claim by an Australian that Montague's cousin, Lionel Druitt, had published a pamphlet in Australia entitled "The East End Murderer – I knew him", but the claim has never been substantiated. Journalist Tom Cullen revealed Druitt's full name in his 1965 book Autumn of Terror, which was followed by Farson's 1972 book Jack the Ripper. Before the discovery of Macnaghten's memo, books on the Ripper case, such as those written by Leonard Matters and Donald McCormick, poured scorn on stories that the Ripper had drowned in the Thames because they could not find a suicide that matched the description of the culprit. Cullen and Farson, however, supposed that Druitt was the Ripper on the basis of the Macnaghten memorandum, the near coincidence between Druitt's death and the end of the murders, the closeness of Whitechapel to Druitt's rooms in the Inner Temple, the insanity that was acknowledged by the inquest verdict of "unsound mind", and the possibility that Druitt had absorbed the rudimentary anatomical skill supposedly shown by the Ripper through observing his father at work.

Since the publication of Cullen's and Farson's books, other Ripper authors have argued that their theories are based solely on flawed circumstantial evidence, and have attempted to provide Druitt with alibis for the times of the murders. On 1 September, the day after the murder of Nichols, Druitt was in Dorset playing cricket. On the day of Chapman's murder, he played cricket in Blackheath, and the day after the murders of Stride and Eddowes, he was in the West Country defending a client in a court case. While writers Cullen and Andrew Spallek argue that Druitt had the time and opportunity to travel by train between London and his cricket and legal engagements, or use his city chambers as a base from which to commit the murders, others dismiss that as "improbable". Many experts believe that the killer was local to Whitechapel, whereas Druitt lived miles away on the other side of the River Thames. His chambers were within walking distance of Whitechapel, and his regular rail journey would almost certainly have brought him to Cannon Street station, a few minutes' walk from the East End. It seems unlikely, however, that he could have travelled the distance in blood-stained clothes unnoticed, and a clue discovered during the investigation into the murder of Eddowes (a piece of her blood-stained clothing) indicates that the murderer travelled north-east from where she was murdered, whereas Druitt's chambers, and the railway station, were to the south-west.

Macnaghten incorrectly described Druitt as a 41-year-old doctor and cited allegations that he "was sexually insane" without specifying the source or details of the allegations. Macnaghten did not join the force until 1889, after the murder of Kelly and the death of Druitt, and was not involved in the investigation directly. Macnaghten's memorandum named two other suspects ("Kosminski" and Michael Ostrog) and was written to refute allegations against a fourth, Thomas Hayne Cutbush. The three Macnaghten suspects – Druitt, Kosminski and Ostrog – also match the descriptions of three unnamed suspects in Major Arthur Griffiths' Mysteries of Police and Crime (1898); Griffiths was Inspector of Prisons at the time of the Ripper murders.

Inspector Frederick Abberline, who was the leading investigative officer in the case, appeared to dismiss Druitt as a suspect on the basis that the only evidence against him was the coincidental timing of his suicide shortly after the fifth murder. Other officials involved in the Ripper case, Metropolitan Police Commissioner James Monro and pathologist Thomas Bond, believed that the murder of Alice McKenzie on 17 July 1889, seven months after Druitt's death, was committed by the same culprit as the earlier murders. The inclusion of McKenzie among the Ripper's victims was contested by Abberline and Macnaghten among others, but if she was one of his victims, then Druitt clearly could not be the Ripper. Another murder occasionally included among the Ripper cases is that of Martha Tabram, who was viciously stabbed to death on 7 August 1888. Her death coincided with the middle of Bournemouth Cricket Week, 4–11 August, in which Druitt was heavily involved, and was during the school holidays which Druitt spent in Dorset. In the words of one of his biographers, "It scarcely left time for a 200-mile round dash to fit in a murder."

== Legacy ==
Druitt was a favoured suspect in the Ripper murders throughout the 1960s, until the advent of theories in the 1970s that the murders were not the work of a single serial killer but the result of a conspiracy involving the British royal family and Freemasonry. These theories, widely condemned as ridiculous, implicate Prince Albert Victor, Duke of Clarence and Avondale, his tutor James Stephen, and their doctor Sir William Gull to varying degrees. One version of the conspiracy promoted by Stephen Knight in his 1976 book Jack the Ripper: The Final Solution supposed that Druitt was a scapegoat, chosen by officialdom to take the blame for the murders. Martin Howells and Keith Skinner followed the same line in their 1987 book The Ripper Legacy, which was panned by one critic as being based on "no evidence whatever".

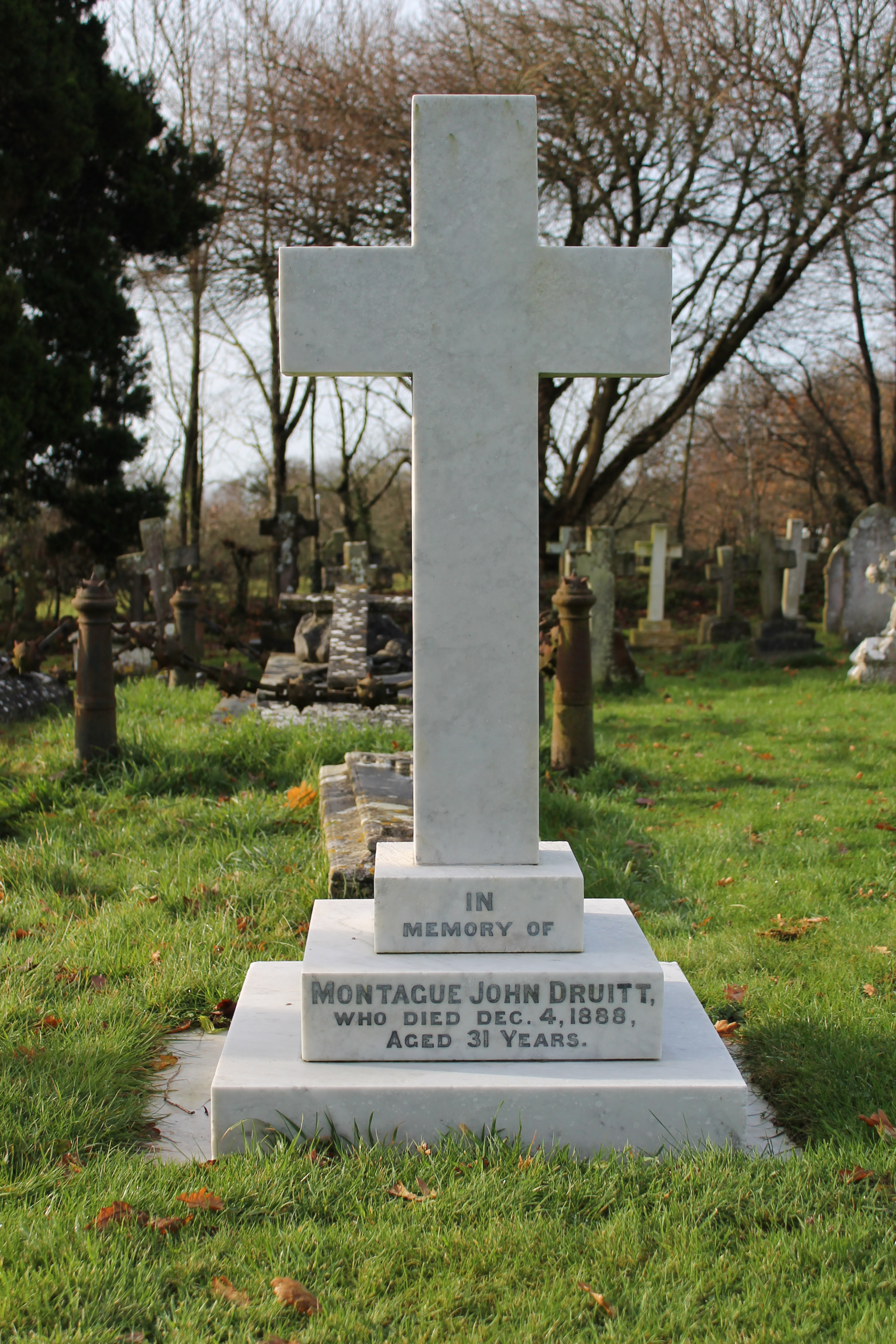
Memorial to Montague John Druitt at Wimborne Cemetery, stating the death date as 4 December 1888

The theories attempted to link Druitt with Clarence, Gull and Stephen through a network of mutual acquaintances and possible connections. Reginald Acland, the brother of Gull's son-in-law, had legal chambers in King's Bench Walk near Druitt's, as did Harry Stephen, who was James Stephen's brother. Harry Stephen was good friends with Harry Wilson, who had a house in Chiswick, "The Osiers", near to where Druitt's body was found. Wilson and James Stephen were close friends of Clarence, and were both members of an exclusive society called the Cambridge Apostles. As a schoolboy, Druitt had played cricket against two of Wilson's friends, Kynaston Studd and Henry Goodhart, who was also one of the Apostles. Another potential connection between Druitt and Wilson is through John Henry Lonsdale. Lonsdale's name and Blackheath address are written in a diary belonging to Wilson now in the possession of Trinity College, Cambridge. Lonsdale's address is a few yards from the school at which Druitt worked and lived, and Lonsdale had been a barrister and had also rented legal chambers in King's Bench Walk. In 1887, Lonsdale entered the church and was assigned as curate to Wimborne Minster, where the Druitt family worshiped. Lonsdale and Macnaghten were classmates at Eton, and so theorists argue that Lonsdale might have been in a position to provide "private information" to Macnaghten regarding Druitt. The connections between the Apostles and Druitt led to the suggestion that he was part of the same social set. Druitt, his mother, and his sister Georgiana, were invited to a ball in honour of Clarence at the home of Lord Wimborne on 17 December 1888, although they did not attend because by that time Montague was dead, his mother was in an asylum, and his sister was expecting her second child. Clarence, Stephen, Wilson, Studd, and Goodhart are suggested to have been homosexual, although this is contested by historians. John Wilding's 1993 book Jack the Ripper Revealed used the connections between Druitt and Stephen to propose that they committed the crimes together, but reviewers considered it an "imaginative tale ... most questionable", an "exercise in ingenuity rather than ... fact", and "lack[ing] evidential support".

In his 2005 and 2006 biographies of Druitt, D. J. Leighton concluded that Druitt was innocent, but repeated some of Knight's and Wilding's discredited claims. Leighton suggested that Druitt could have been murdered, either out of greed by his elder brother William or, as previously suggested by Howells and Skinner, out of fear of exposure by Harry Wilson's homosexual cronies. The propensity of some theorists to associate Ripper suspects with homosexuality has led scholars to assume that such notions are based on homophobia rather than evidence.

The accusations against Clarence, Stephen, Gull and Druitt also draw on cultural perceptions of a decadent ruling class, and depict a high-born murderer or murderers preying on lower-class victims. Because Druitt and the other upper-middle-class and aristocratic Ripper suspects were wealthy, there is more biographical material on them than on the residents of the Whitechapel slums. Consequently, it is easier for writers to construct solutions based on a wealthy culprit rather than one involving a Whitechapel resident. There is no direct evidence against Druitt, and since the 1970s, the number of Jack the Ripper suspects has continued to grow, with the result that there are now over 100 different theories about the Ripper's identity.

In fiction, Druitt is depicted as the murderer in the musical Jack the Ripper by Ron Pember and Denis de Marne. In John Gardner's Sherlock Holmes story The Return of Moriarty, Professor Moriarty's criminal exploits are hampered by increased police activity as a result of the Jack the Ripper murders. He discovers that Druitt is the murderer and so fakes his suicide in the hope that the police will lose interest once the murders cease. In Alan Moore's graphic novel From Hell, Druitt is portrayed as a patsy for the royal family, made to look guilty of the Ripper murders in order to protect the real killer, Sir William Gull.
