= Melville Macnaghten =

British police commissioner (1853–1921)

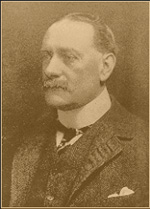
Sir Melville Macnaghten

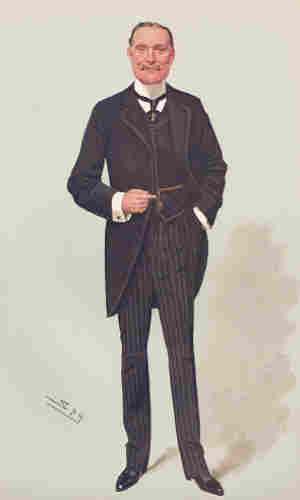
Macnaghten caricatured by Spy for Vanity Fair, 1908

Sir Melville Leslie Macnaghten CB KPM (16 June 1853, Woodford, London −12 May 1921) was Assistant Commissioner (Crime) of the London Metropolitan Police from 1903 to 1913. A highly regarded and famously affable figure of the late Victorian and Edwardian eras he played major investigative roles in cases that led to the establishment and acceptance of fingerprint identification. He was also a major player in the pursuit and capture of Dr. Crippen, and of the exoneration of a wrongly convicted man, Adolph Beck, which helped lead to the creation of the Court of Criminal Appeal in 1907.

When he prematurely retired in 1913 due to illness, Macnaghten claimed to journalists that he knew the exact identity of Jack the Ripper, the nickname of the unknown serial killer of poor prostitutes in London's impoverished East End during the late Victorian era. The police chief called the killer "that remarkable man", but refused to name him or divulge details that might identify him, except to reveal that he had taken his own life at the end of 1888. Macnaghten further claimed that he had destroyed the relevant papers to keep forever secret the deceased killer's identity. Since 1965, the public has known that Macnaghten's suspect was Montague John Druitt, a country doctor's son and young barrister who inexplicably drowned himself in the River Thames in early December 1888. The source of Macnaghten's alleged "private information" about Druitt has two candidates, both only uncovered in the early 21st century. One is a Tory politician, H. R. Farquharson, who lived near the Druitts and also went to Eton with Macnaghten, and the other is Colonel Sir Vivian Majendie.

Since 1959, Macnaghten has been known for a major report written in the 1890s on the Ripper case, naming three possible Jack the Ripper suspects. There are two versions of this document, one that was filed in the archives of Scotland Yard. It was, however, a copy of the privately held version in the possession of his daughter, Christabel, Lady Aberconway – the version which strongly advocated "M. J. Druitt" as the likeliest suspect to have been the Whitechapel assassin – that was revealed in 1959. Macnaghten's opinion that the case was likely solved, and that it was a "Protean" maniac who had taken his own life, had already been confirmed in his 1914 memoir, "Days of My Years" (London, Edward Arnold) though Druitt was not named (and no other suspects are mentioned as possibilities).

More recently, French writer Sophie Herfort has argued that Macnaghten himself was responsible for the Jack the Ripper murders.

== Early life and marriage ==
The youngest of fifteen children of Elliot Macnaghten, the last Chairman of the British East India Company, Macnaghten was educated at Eton. In his memoirs he describes his schooldays as the happiest of his life, even going so far as to write that he knew this to be so as he lived them. After leaving school in 1872, he went to India to run his father's tea estates in Bengal and remained there until 1888, albeit with occasional visits back home. In 1881 he was assaulted by Indian land rioters and as a result, became a friend of James Monro, who was District Judge and Inspector-General in the Bombay Presidency at the time.

On 3 October 1878 he married Dora Emily Sanderson, the daughter of a canon from Chichester. They had two sons and two daughters, among them Christabel, Lady Aberconway, who married the MP and industrialist Henry Duncan McLaren.

== Career in the Criminal Investigation Department ==
Upon his return to England, Macnaghten was offered the post of first Assistant Chief Constable (CID) in the Metropolitan Police by Monro, who by that time had become the first Assistant Commissioner (Crime); however this appointment was opposed by Charles Warren, the Commissioner of Police of the Metropolis, allegedly due to the beating he took by "the Hindoos" back in Bengal; but the real reason seemed to be that Warren and Monro did not get along well from the beginning. Warren's rejection of Macnaghten widened the rift between the two men, resulting in Monro's resignation and his transfer to Special Branch by the Home Secretary, Henry Matthews.

However, due to the continuous disagreements with Home Secretary Matthews, Commissioner Warren chose to resign on 9 November 1888. Monro was brought in to succeed him as Commissioner. With this turn of events, Macnaghten was brought in with the position of Assistant Chief Constable in June 1889; he was later promoted to Chief Constable in 1890, following the unexpected death of the first incumbent, Adolphus Williamson.

=== Macnaghten and Jack the Ripper ===
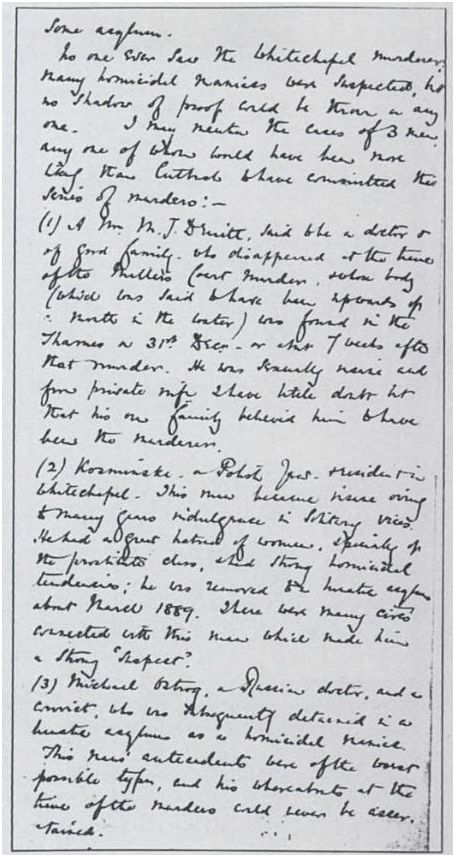
A page from the Macnaghten memorandum of 1894, in which he names three suspects

Even though he missed being on the police force during the Ripper killings of 1888, Macnaghten was actively involved in the investigation of the murders of Whitechapel prostitutes between 1889 and 1891. Crimes that were initially believed by some at Scotland Yard, and certainly by the tabloid press, to be by the same perpetrator. In his memoir, Macnaghten claimed that information received "some years after" the final murder of 1888 led him to the belief that Jack the Ripper was a man who had taken his own life at the end of that year. The source of these "certain facts" that led to this "conclusion" is unidentified, though he implies in his book that it was the murderer's "own people", e.g. his relations who supposedly lived with him) who must have privately briefed the Chief Constable.

In February 1891 a Conservative MP, Henry Richard Farquharson, the member for West Dorset, was telling people in London that he knew the murderer to have been a surgeon's son who had committed suicide. This story leaked to the press, though it never became a sensation. According to Macnaghten, Druitt's own family "believed" he was Jack the Ripper. Due to speculation in the press about another madman, Macnaghten wrote a confidential report dated 23 February 1894 naming Druitt as a Ripper suspect and placed it on file. This document, in its entirety, was not publicly available until 1975 (the section mentioning only the suspects had been published in 1966). The alternate version of this same document, believed by many to be a draft, has never been sighted by a researcher and is thought to be lost. Instead a copy of this second version was made by Macnaghten's daughter Christabel, Lady Aberconway, who allowed some of its contents to be publicly broadcast by television presenter Daniel Farson in 1959. The name of the chief suspect was not revealed until 1965, by the American journalist and author Tom Cullen. Why Macnaghten composed two versions remains the subject of controversy, speculation and historical debate among writers on the Ripper mystery (some have argued that the so-called Aberconway version is a rewrite of the 1894 original). This report proved influential for Jack the Ripper research, for it popularised the idea that the Ripper only had five true victims and also named three possible suspects.

Macnaghten, in writing from memory, committed many factual errors in his report. For example, he inaccurately described Druitt as a 41-year-old doctor who vanished immediately after the final murder on 9 November 1888. In fact, Druitt was functioning normally, at least outwardly, at his places of work and play until the end of November 1888. This document also says that his family only "suspected" he was the Ripper. Years later Druitt came to his attention due to information received that was judged, by Macnaghten, to be so credible that post-1888 murders could not exonerate the barrister.

In the filed version of Macnaghten's report he wrote that M. J. Druitt was "said to be a doctor", whilst affirming that the suspect was definitely "sexually insane" and his family "believed" he was the killer. Frederick Abberline, the field detective who led the investigation, did not believe that Druitt was the Ripper. Macnaghten also makes a mistake in describing the drowned suspect a "young doctor" or "medical student" (some writers have wondered if Abberline was perhaps confusing Druitt with a Whitechapel suspect in 1888 who was a young, medical student, named John Sanders). The second of Macnaghten's three suspects was identified only as "Kosminski," presumably Aaron Kosminski, a Polish Jew who lived in Whitechapel and was committed to an insane asylum in 1891. While not on the top of Macnaghten's list, Kosminski was suspected by Sir Robert Anderson, the man who succeeded Monro as Assistant Commissioner, with apparent confirmation by Chief Inspector Donald Swanson, Anderson's desk officer. As with Druitt, definitive evidence is lacking to support this allegation, and both Anderson and Swanson also made errors about Kosminski, their preferred suspect (the most significant of which was to claim "Kosminski" was long deceased when he was still alive; they also claim he was positively identified by a Jewish witness who refused to testify, often thought to be Israel Schwartz, a claim publicly and explicitly rejected by police chief Major Henry Smith, and implicitly by Macnaghten via his proxies and in his memoirs).

The third suspect in Macnaghten's report was a man named Michael Ostrog, a Russian-born thief and con man who affected several aliases and disguises and was detained in asylums on several occasions. There is little to support this suspicion against Ostrog: records sho that he was imprisoned in France during the murders.

=== Later career, including as Assistant Commissioner ===
In 1900 Macnaghten served in the Belper Committee to inquire about "the working of the method of Identification of Criminals by Measurement and Fingerprints". As the committee recommended the use of fingerprints as a means of identification over bertillonage, largely due to the testimony of Edward Henry on their respective merits.

When Henry was appointed Commissioner in 1903, succeeding Sir Edward Bradford, Macnaghten was appointed Assistant Commissioner (Crime) and became involved in many of the most famous cases in the history of the Metropolitan Police, including the Hawley Harvey Crippen case and the Farrow double murder case, which resulted in the conviction and hanging of Albert and Alfred Stratton largely on the basis on fingerprint evidence. He also claimed in his memoirs to have found the critical female witness who exonerated the falsely convicted Adolf Beck, a notorious mis-carriage of justice which led to the creation of the Court of Criminal Appeal.

Macnaghten was knighted in the 1907 King's Birthday Honours List. In the 1912 New Years Honours List, he was appointed Companion of the Order of the Bath (CB). He was awarded the King's Police Medal (KPM) in the 1913 New Years Honours List. He was also a Knight Commander of the White Military Order of Spain and a Commander of the Order of the Dannebrog.

== Retirement and later life ==
However, in 1911 Macnaghten was experiencing the first signs of ill-health; even a trip to Australia the following year failed to improve matters. He was forced to retire from his job in 1913. Macnaghten's successor at Scotland Yard was Basil Thomson who had attended New College, Oxford at the same time as Montague John Druitt, Macnaghten's preferred Ripper suspect.

In 1914 he published his memoirs Days of My Years. He also made a translation of Horace's Ars Poetica into English verse, an effort to which he devoted the last ten years of his life.

Macnaghten died on 12 May 1921 at Queen Anne's Mansions, Westminster.

== Macnaghten in fiction ==
Macnaghten appears in The Adventures of Inspector Lestrade (1985), ISBN 0-333-38447-4, the first of the Inspector Lestrade novels by M. J. Trow. The book deals with the aftermath of the Ripper case and with Macnaghten's report. Trow misspells Macnaghten's name as "McNaghten" in his book and presents a fictional version of Macnaghten's daughter.

Macnaghten also features prominently in the later chapters of Alan Moore's seminal graphic novel From Hell, and in Kevin Morris' serialized novel The Ripper Lives, a sequel that continues the story of Jack the Ripper after the Canonical Five.

== Footnotes ==
Police appointments
Preceded by Adolphus Williamson	Chief Constable (CID), Metropolitan Police; 1890–1903	Succeeded by Frederick Shore Bullock
Preceded by Edward Henry	Assistant Commissioner (Crime), Metropolitan Police; 1903–1913	Succeeded by Basil Thomson
