= Martin Fido =

British writer (1939–2019)

- Born: 18 October 1939; Penzance, United Kingdom
- Died: 2 April 2019 (aged 79); North Falmouth, Massachusetts, United States
- Occupations: University lecturer, writer and broadcaster
- Known for: True crime writing and broadcasting
- Notable work: Murder After Midnight, LBC

Martin Austin Fido (18 October 1939 – 2 April 2019) was a university professor, true crime writer and broadcaster. His many books include The Crimes, Detection and Death of Jack the Ripper, The Krays: Unfinished Business, The Official Encyclopedia of Scotland Yard, Serial Killers, and The Murder Guide to London. He is also one of the authors of The Complete Jack the Ripper A to Z.

Martin Fido was born in Heamoor, Penzance, Cornwall on 18 October 1939, to Austin Harry and Enid Mary (Hobrough) Fido. He attended Truro School and later Lincoln College, Oxford, where he earned a Bachelor of Arts in 1961. He pursued a Master’s degree on the novels of Benjamin Disraeli at Balliol College, Oxford.

On 21 June 1961, Fido married Judith Mary Spicer, and the couple had two daughters. After leaving college in 1966, where he had been a junior research fellow in English, he went to the University of Leeds where he lectured in English until 1973. In 1971, he spent a year as a visiting associate professor a Michigan State University in the USA. Following his divorce from Judith in 1972, he married his second wife Norma Elaine Wilson on 16 December 1972.

In 1973, he became a reader in English Literature and head of the English department at the University of the West Indies, Cave Hill Campus, Barbados. In the West Indies he was active in theatre and educational broadcasting, and during this time he had a son. After he separated from his wife (they divorced in 1984), he resigned from his job to write a book about science, philosophy and 19th-century literature, but he lost seven years of work in a fire.

In 1983 he returned to England, moved into a block of flats previously occupied by the Kray twins, and became a freelance writer and broadcaster, specialising in true crime. While researching for his book Murder Guide to London (1986), Fido examined the memoirs of several senior Scotland Yard officials. One official, Sir Robert Anderson, claimed that Jack the Ripper's identity was known to police and described the killer as a "poor Polish Jew." Fido initially identified the suspect as a man named "Kosminski." However, further investigation revealed inconsistencies in the records relating to Aaron Kosminski, leading Fido to conclude that the details aligned more closely with another individual: an inmate known as "David Cohen." Fido theorized that Cohen, a violently disturbed man institutionalized around the time the murders stopped, may have been the person actually referred to in police documents, with "Kosminski" possibly resulting from clerical confusion or misidentification. He ultimately identified David Cohen as the most likely suspect and published his conclusions in The Crimes, Detection and Death of Jack the Ripper (1987). Former FBI criminal profiler John E. Douglas later supported this theory in his book The Cases That Haunt Us (2000), stating that behavioural evidence pointed to "a person known to the police as David Cohen ... or someone very much like him."

From 1987 to 2001, Fido broadcast a weekly segment called Murder After Midnight on Clive Bull's LBC Radio series Through The Night, in which he detailed a famous true crime case in each episode. Several of these segments were produced and released commercially on cassette and CD by his friend (and fellow LBC broadcaster) Paul Savory, and edited versions of many of the scripts were released in book form. During this time, Fido also regularly led tours of the Jack the Ripper murder locations around London, and was caricatured as the tour guide Rowan Rover in Sharyn McCrumb's 1991 novel Missing Susan.

Beyond true crime, he has written illustrated biographies of Charles Dickens, William Shakespeare, Rudyard Kipling and Oscar Wilde, and books on Agatha Christie, and Sherlock Holmes. He also translated Louis Cazamian's Le Roman Social en Angleterre, and his play Let's Go Bajan! was performed successfully in Barbados and London.

On 17 December 1994, Fido married Karen Lynn Sandel, and in 2000, with his three children all adults, he settled in Cape Cod, Massachusetts, USA, to help Karen (who died on 29 October 2013) nurse her parents through their terminal illnesses. From 2001 until his death, he taught writing and research at Boston University, including a course called “Sympathy for the Devil”. He was himself a practicing Quaker.

Martin Fido, who was suffering from cancer in his later years, died on 2 April 2019 of complications resulting from a fall.

== Selected bibliography ==
- Charles Dickens (1968)
- Charles Dickens: An Authentic Account of His Life and Times (1970)
- Oscar Wilde (1973)
- Rudyard Kipling (1974)
- Shakespeare (1978)
- Oscar Wilde: An Illustrated Biography (1985)
- Shakespeare (1985)
- Murder Guide to London (1986)
- The Crimes, Detection and Death of Jack the Ripper (1987)
- Bodysnatchers: A History of the Resurrectionists, 1742–1832 (1989)
- Murders after Midnight (1990)
- The Peasenhall Murder (with K. Skinner, 1990)
- Rudyard Kipling: An Illustrated Biography (1988)
- The Complete Jack the Ripper A to Z (with P. Begg & K. Skinner, 1991, multiple editions)
- The Chronicle of Crime: The Infamous Felons of Modern History and Their Hideous Crimes (1993)
- Deadly Jealousy (1993)
- Great Crimes and Trials of the Twentieth Century (with P. Begg, 1994)
- Twentieth Century Murder (1995)
- The World's Worst Medical Mistakes (with K. Fido, 1996)
- Our Family (with K. Fido, 1997)
- The World of Charles Dickens: The Life, Times and Works of the Great Victorian Novelist (1997, updated 2012)
- The World of Sherlock Holmes (1998)
- The World of Agatha Christie (1999)
- The Official Encyclopedia of Scotland Yard (1999)
- A History of British Serial Killing (2002)

== Plays ==
- Let's Go Bajan! (1983)
