= James Monro =

Scottish lawyer, Commissioner of Police London

James Monro CB
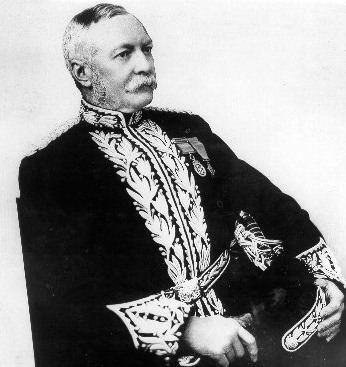

Commissioner of Police of the Metropolis
- In office 1888–1890
- Preceded by: Charles Warren
- Succeeded by: Edward Bradford

Assistant Commissioner of Police of the Metropolis (Crime)
- In office 1884–1888

Personal details
- Born: 1838 Edinburgh, Scotland
- Died: 28 January 1920 (aged 81–82)

James Monro CB (1838 – 28 January 1920) was a lawyer who became the first Assistant Commissioner (Crime) of the London Metropolitan Police and also served as Commissioner of Police of the Metropolis from 1888 to 1890.

== Early career ==
Monro was born in Edinburgh, the son of George Monro, a solicitor. He was educated at Edinburgh High School, the University of Edinburgh and the University of Berlin. In 1857, he joined the Legal Branch of the Indian Civil Service. He served successively as Assistant Magistrate, Collector and District Judge in the Bombay Presidency. He then became Inspector-General of Police in the Presidency.

In 1863, Monro married Ruth Littlejohn, an Aberdeen woman.

== Assistant Commissioner ==
In 1884, Monro resigned from the Indian Civil Service and returned to Britain, being appointed the first Assistant Commissioner (Crime) in London. He succeeded Howard Vincent, whose title had been Director of Criminal Investigation, as head of the Criminal Investigation Department (CID). Vincent had answered directly to the Home Secretary and not to the Commissioner, and thus had had the status, but not the title, of Assistant Commissioner. Monro, however, did answer to the Commissioner.

Monro's immediate problem on his appointment was the Fenian bombing campaign. He managed to bring it under control by 1887. He forged a close alliance with Robert Anderson, the Home Office adviser who controlled the spies infiltrating the Fenians. The two men shared religious beliefs, with both being Protestant Millenariarists. Their greatest achievement was in 1887, when they foiled an attempted bombing of Westminster Abbey during Queen Victoria's Golden Jubilee celebrations.

Monro politicked behind the scenes to assert his primacy over the Home Office in the secret world of spying against the Fenians. Eventually, he was successful and Special Branch, under his control, became the sole force in charge of covert security in the United Kingdom. He even retained personal control over it when he became Commissioner.

In 1886, Sir Charles Warren became Commissioner. He and Monro never saw eye-to-eye. Monro had been widely tipped to succeed as Commissioner, and was disappointed not to do so. Warren also tried to assert his authority over CID, which his predecessor, Sir Edmund Henderson, had left almost entirely in Monro's hands. Warren was not particularly interested in detective work, but unlike Henderson he did not like Monro working directly for the Home Secretary without his approval. In 1888, the last straw came when Warren vetoed Monro's choice of Melville Macnaghten as first Chief Constable (CID). Both Monro and Warren threatened to resign. Home Secretary Henry Matthews accepted Monro's resignation in September and replaced him with Anderson. However, he retained Monro as head of Special Branch (which was outside the Commissioner's control) and gave him the title of Head of Detectives, with an office in the Home Office. Anderson and his senior CID officers continued to consult with him behind Warren's back, particularly during the Jack the Ripper case, with Matthews's complete connivance. Monro refused to accept a salary.

Monro was appointed a Companion of the Bath (CB) in June 1888.

== Commissioner ==
Worn out by constant criticism, Warren resigned in November 1888, and Matthews appointed Monro to replace him as Commissioner. Monro was extremely popular within the force, and his appointment was welcomed. However, with a tenure of only eighteen months, he was to be the shortest-serving Commissioner in the Met's history.

Monro immediately clashed with the Home Office and the Receiver, the force's chief financial officer. He complained that he had a shortage of men and that the uniform boots and trousers were of extremely inferior quality. In 1890, Assistant Commissioner Richard Pearson died suddenly. Monro wanted to replace him with Chief Constable Charles Howard, but the Home Office preferred Evelyn Ruggles-Brise, one of its own high-flyers. Monro refused, saying that his force had been promised promotions from below. This was compounded by Monro's backing of his men's grievances over pay and pensions. Matthews announced a bill to improve them, but Monro said it was too little. When Matthews refused to budge, Monro offered his resignation, which was accepted on 12 June 1890, to take effect on 21 June. On 17 June, the bill was published, and met Monro's demands. Howard was also appointed Assistant Commissioner. There was speculation in the press that Matthews had been playing dirty tricks on Monro. Monro got some sort of revenge on 18 July by chairing a meeting of all his superintendents which rejected all of the proposals which he himself had demanded! He left the Met as a hero to both the police and the press.

In 1995 Monro's grandson, Christopher Monro, disclosed that Monro had been convinced that Montague Druitt had been Jack the Ripper but was prevented from saying so. William Druitt, brother of Montague, had threatened that if his brother was named, he would reveal that there were homosexuals in high positions in Parliament, the Bar, the Army and the Church. Christopher Monro was told this by his father Douglas Monro, who had examined Monro's papers after his death.

== Missionary ==
Monro returned to India in 1890 as a missionary, founding and running Ranaghat Christian Medical Mission in the far north of the country. In 1903, he retired to England, living in Chiswick.

== Media portrayals ==
In BBC One's Ripper Street (2013), Monro was played by Michael McElhatton.

== Footnotes ==
Police appointments
Preceded by Howard Vincent; Director of Criminal Investigation	Assistant Commissioner (Crime), Metropolitan Police; 1884–1888	Succeeded by Robert Anderson
Preceded by Sir Charles Warren	Commissioner of Police of the Metropolis; 1888–1890	Succeeded by Sir Edward Bradford
