= Samuel Lee Anderson =

Irish Crown administrator and secret service officer

Sir Samuel Lee Anderson KCB
- Born: 14 June 1837
- Died: 1 December 1886 (aged 49); Dublin, Ireland
- Education: Bachelors Law degree, Trinity College Dublin; MA, Trinity College Dublin
- Occupations: Crown Lawyer, Secret Service Officer, Intelligence Officer, Theologian, Writer
- Years active: 1865–1884
- Known for: Anti-Fenian activity, establishment of a permanent Secret Service department in Dublin Castle
- Title: Crown Lawyer for the Counties of Waterford and Kilkenny, Marshall of Court of the Admiralty of Ireland
- Spouse: Elizabeth Barcroft
- Parent: Matthew Anderson
- Awards: Knight Commander of the Order of the Bath (KCB)

Sir Samuel Lee Anderson KCB (14 June 1837 – 1 December 1886) was an Irish Crown Lawyer and Secret Service Officer working with the Dublin Castle administration in Ireland. He worked on anti-Fenian and criminal cases in Ireland from 1865 to 1884. He was also an intelligence officer, theologian and writer.

His working life was based on being an intelligence officer and Crown Lawyer in Dublin working alongside his brother Sir Robert Anderson, who was also a lawyer and intelligence officer. Robert collated intelligence sent from the British Consul in America. He was eventually seconded to London to work for the Secret Service Department of the British Crown in the Irish Office in London.

== Irish Secret Service ==
Anderson was appointed by Richard Bourke, 6th Earl of Mayo, the then Chief Secretary for Ireland, to undertake certain confidential work at Dublin Castle and became a specialist in anti-Fenian activity in Ireland. He built an effective intelligence network working alongside his brother, Sir Robert Anderson, by creating a dedicated Irish "Secret Service" of which up till then was not a dedicated or permanent operational office. The Secret Service operation was mainly controlled by "The Irish office" run from London. Assisted by John Rose and joined by his brother Robert, he built up a substantial permanent secret service department in Dublin Castle re-organising files and briefs that were not indexed or collated. Lee Anderson and his brother had a significant impact on against Fenian activity for the trials in 1865-1866 and combined with the use of cutting edge technology of photography producing hundreds of early photographs of Fenian prisoners which are now located in the National Library of Ireland. Lee Anderson was successful in his work, and in 1868 was appointed Crown Lawyer for the Counties of Waterford and Kilkenny.

== Invincibles assassination ==
Because of his secret service work, Samuel Lee Anderson became a target for Fenian dissidents and a group called the "Irish National Invincibles" who saw him as a threat to the republican movement. He avoided assassination by changing his daily route to Dublin Castle on the day he was singled out by the group.

The group eventually assassinated the Permanent Under Secretary Thomas Henry Burke of the Irish Office, and the newly installed Chief Secretary for Ireland, Lord Frederick Cavendish; in the Phoenix park, Dublin in May 1882.

== Personal life and death ==
The son of Matthew Anderson, Samuel Lee Anderson was educated at Rugby College and Trinity College Dublin getting a Bachelors Law degree in 1859 and an MA in 1862. He was appointed Chief Clerk in the crime department in the Chief Secretary's office in Dublin Castle before being appointed as Crown Solicitor for Dublin in 1868. He held the office of "Marshall of Court of the Admiralty of Ireland" from 1866 to 1868. He was called to the bar in 1877.

He married Elizabeth Barcroft in 1863, living at Knapton House, Kingstown (Dun Laoighre, County Dublin) and 74 Baggot Street. His wife was the daughter of Joseph Barcroft of Strangmore, County Tyrone. He worked on Fenian and state trials until the conviction of the Irish National Invincibles in 1882.

Anderson's work "took toll on his health" and he took early retirement in 1884. He was knighted, by Earl Spencer, shortly afterwards in 1884. He died at Knapton House in Dublin on 1 December 1886 and is buried in Mount Jerome Cemetery in Harold's Cross, Dublin.
