= Michael Ostrog =

Russian fraudster (c. 1833 – c. 1904)

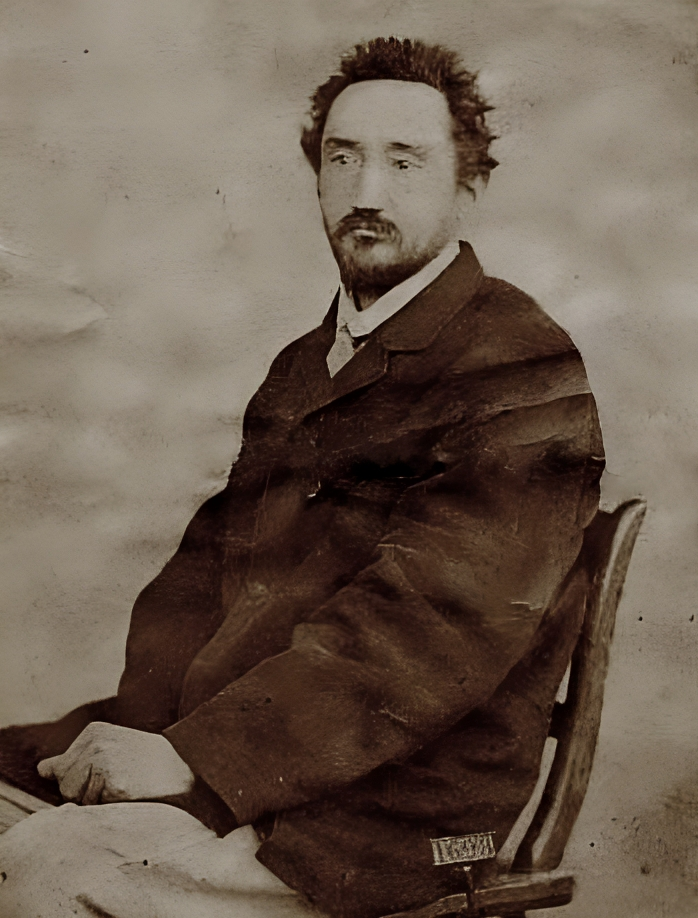
- Portrait of Michael Ostrog (c. 1870s)
- Born: c. 1833; Russian Empire
- Died: after 1904 (aged c. 70/71); England
- Other names: Bertrand Ashley; Michael Orloff
- Occupations: Scam artist, fraudster
- Convictions: Theft, scamming, fraud, robbery, attempted murder
- Penalty: Various

Michael Ostrog (Note: Casebook lists his aliases as including Bertrand Ashley, Claude Clayton, Dr. Grant, Max Grief Gosslar, and Max Sobiekski.) (c. 1833 – after 1904) was a Russian criminal and Jack the Ripper suspect, first proposed in a memorandum by Sir Melville Macnaghten in 1894.

Ostrog was a swindler with a profuse police record who perpetrated multiple scams and frauds, but it was never proven that he committed any murders. According to 21st century investigations, during 1888 he was imprisoned in France, and such a circumstance would rule out his participation in any of the Whitechapel murders.

== Biography ==
Ostrog was born in the Russian Empire around 1833, and little is known about his early life. He emigrated to England, and first became known by the authorities after he committed a robbery at the University of Oxford using the pseudonym of 'Max Grief'; he was convicted and sentenced to ten months in prison. The following year, he was imprisoned again, this time for three months after committing multiple frauds in Cambridge. In December 1864, he was convicted of fraud again, and sentenced to eight months in prison. In August 1866, he was jailed for seven years after a series of robberies, mostly stealing gold watches from a jewellery store in Maidstone.

In 1873, Ostrog was released from prison and soon began committing thefts once again. He was arrested and taken to the police station in Burton upon Trent, where he resisted and tried to fire a gun upon the officers. In January 1874, as a result of robberies, contempt and attempted murder, he was sentenced to 10 years in prison and was released in 1883. Four years later, in July 1887, he stole the trophy from a cricket contest, and was sentenced to six months in prison.

Once he was released in March 1888, prison authorities considered Ostrog to be reformed; however, an article published by Police Gazette was argued that he was very dangerous. In September of that year, he committed another robbery in Paris, France. He then left and returned to England, where he was admitted to an asylum in Surrey in 1891. After this seclusion, he continued to periodically leave and enter prisons for thefts, scams and frauds until 1904, the year any information about him ceases to be published. It is presumed that he died about this time.

== Jack the Ripper suspect ==
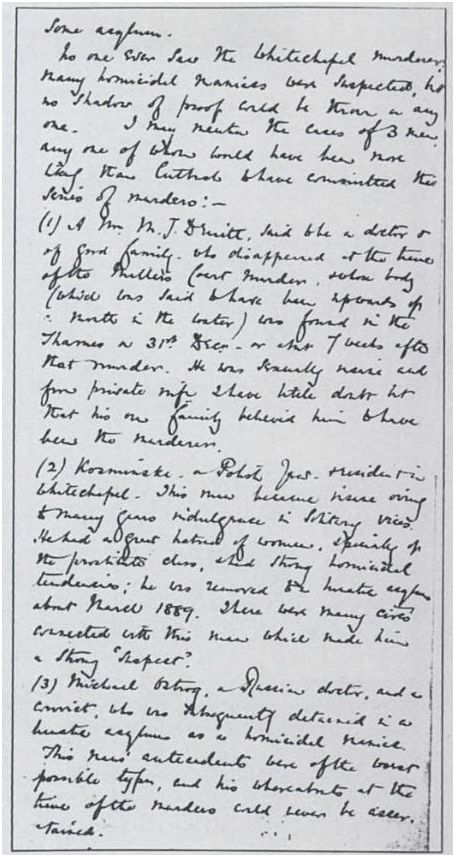
The 1894 memorandum written by Sir Melville Macnaghten, Assistant Chief Constable of the London Metropolitan Police, naming "Kosminski" as one of three suspects in the Jack the Ripper case. The other two suspects he named were Montague Druitt and Michael Ostrog.

Ostrog was a professional scammer who used costumes to improve the chances for a successful scam. He also used a variety of aliases for the same purpose, always seeking to surround himself with an air of mystery, and spread all kinds of lies about his life and activities. One of his most creative hoaxes was to repeatedly claim that he worked as a surgeon in the Russian Navy. However, this was just another of his numerous inventions.

Even though in the memorandum of the Scotland Yard chief, Sir Melville Macnaghten, Ostrog was identified as a Jack the Ripper suspect, the investigators did not find evidence of violent crime in his past, much less homicide. His record of illegal activities only included theft and scams, making him a white collar criminal.

In 1894, Ostrog was mentioned in the "Macnaghten Memorandum", as a likely perpetuator of Jack the Ripper's crimes. In 2001, Philip Sugden, an expert on the Jack the Ripper case, located police records in which it was stated that Michael Ostrog had been charged with minor crimes and imprisoned in France in 1888, during the period of the Whitechapel murders. This gives him an alibi that excludes him as a possible suspect.

== See also ==
- Jack the Ripper suspects
