= Thomas Hayne Cutbush =

English murder suspect

Thomas Cutbush
- Born: Thomas Hayne Cutbush; 29 June 1866; Kennington, London, England
- Died: 5 July 1903 (aged 37); Broadmoor Hospital, Berkshire, England
- Occupation: Clerk
- Conviction: Attempted murder
- Penalty: Indefinite confinement in a psychiatric hospital

Thomas Hayne Cutbush (1866–1903) was a contemporary suspect for the identity of the serial killer known as Jack the Ripper, as he was accused by the British press shortly after the 1888 murders.

== Biography ==
Thomas Hayne Cutbush was born in 1866 in Kennington, a district about three miles from Whitechapel, and was 22 years old when the murders in London's East End occurred. He came from a respectable middle-class family, but his childhood was an unhappy one; his father left the family when he was two years old and went to New Zealand, where he remarried. Cutbush was an only child, and his mother Kate never married again. Kate and her unmarried sister Clara brought Thomas up. It has been suggested they were very religious women who had neurological disorders, but Kate nevertheless doted on her only son.

Cutbush displayed serious behavioural problems in his first job, from which he was almost immediately fired. In his second job, he pushed his old employer down the stairs. Once he had lost that job, Cutbush began showing extremely idle and extravagant behaviour. During the day, he isolated himself in order to read medical books, and during the nights he wandered around Whitechapel, jumping over the walls of houses in the neighbourhood. He was obsessed with the idea that someone was slowly poisoning him.

It is presumed that Cutbush contracted syphilis from prostitutes in 1888, and from there his behaviour became even more eccentric and aggressive. He was locked up in the asylum in Lambeth, but that lasted only four days. Cutbush managed to escape by jumping the walls of the medical institution. In 1891, he was convicted of stabbing two women in the buttocks – on two different occasions – in the middle of public roads. The victims were Florence Grace Johnson and Isabella Frazer Anderson, both from Kennington. Two years earlier, another man named Collicot perpetrated similar aggressions in the same area, and the police assumed that those attacks inspired Cutbush, who acted in a similar way. Cutbush was found responsible for these crimes by a medical board, and the doctors diagnosed him as psychotic and dangerous. His confinement was arranged for an indefinite period of time, being placed "at the order of her Majesty", according to an expression that was used at the time to describe such cases. The hospitalization was carried out in the Broadmoor Hospital.

== Accusations ==
=== Contemporary ===
In February 1894, the English newspaper The Sun ran a series of articles accusing Thomas Cutbush of being responsible for the "Jack the Ripper" murders committed in London's East End. The public accusations did not give rise to the prosecution of criminal charges against Cutbush, and police hierarchies even defended him, dismissing Cutbush as only being able to commit a single type of crime, that of piquerism, not murder.

Cutbush's most noted defender was Sir Melville Macnaghten, Chief Inspector of Scotland Yard. In a police memorandum, he emphatically rejected the idea that Cutbush could be the killer; he then related the names of three other suspects, outlining the reasons that led him to believe that they were more plausible suspects to occupy the anonymous figure of Jack the Ripper. Macnaghton also suggested that Cutbush was closely related to Superintendent Charles Cutbush, who committed suicide in 1896, a few years after retiring from the Metropolitan Police.

=== Recent ===
In more recent times, the name of Thomas Hayne Cutbush returned as a possible suspect of being Jack the Ripper. In 1993, author A. P. Wolf made the initial publication with the essay "Jack, the myth: A new look at the Ripper", theorizing that the police covered up the killer's identity. The candidate proposed by the author precisely became this individual. It is argued that his anonymity as a murderer was achieved thanks to a police conspiracy, interested in not disclosing that the Ripper was a relative of a Scotland Yard Chief. This hypothesis had followers, who gave their support in later works.

== See also ==
- Jack the Ripper suspects
