= Israel Lipski =

English murderer

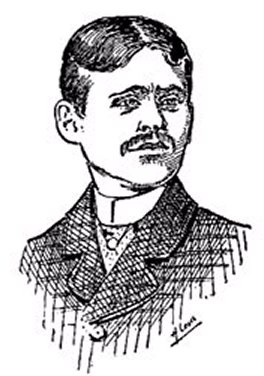
- Born: Israel Lobulsk; 1865
- Died: 22 August 1887 (aged 21–22); London, England
- Cause of death: Execution by hanging
- Occupation: Salesman
- Status: Executed (22 August 1887; 139 years ago)
- Conviction: Murder
- Penalty: Death

Details
- Victims: Miriam Angel
- Date: 28 June 1887

Israel Lipski (born Israel Lobulsk; 1865 – 22 August 1887) was a convicted murderer of Polish-Jewish descent living in the East End of London. Lipski worked as an umbrella stick salesman, employing Harry Schmuss and Henry Rosenbloom. The series of events leading up to his execution began on 28 June 1887 when police were summoned to 16 Batty Street; a young woman, Miriam Angel, had been murdered after being forced to consume nitric acid. She was 6 months pregnant at the time.

Lipski was found beneath her bed, with acid burns inside his own mouth, and was subsequently arrested. Lipski protested his innocence, claiming that Schmuss and Rosenbloom were responsible, but he was charged with murder. The ensuing trial created a storm of controversy, with suggestions that the trial was tarnished by institutional anti-Semitism. Home Secretary Henry Matthews was personally opposed to capital punishment, but remained impartial in Lipski's case.

In the event, the jury took only eight minutes to find Lipski guilty and he was sentenced to hang. The verdict, however, aroused immediate controversy and a press campaign to reprieve Lipski was orchestrated by William Thomas Stead, editor of the Pall Mall Gazette. Even Queen Victoria was said to be troubled by the prospect of Lipski being executed solely on the evidence that had been presented to the court.

As a result of this mounting public disquiet, the execution was postponed for one week while Matthews and the trial judge, James Fitzjames Stephen, met to consider a reprieve. While they were meeting, however, Lipski allegedly broke down and made a full confession to the East End rabbi and community spokesman Simeon Singer, claiming that his motive had been robbery and not, as had been claimed by the prosecution, rape. He was hanged the following day, 22 August 1887, in the yard of Newgate Prison.

== Connection to the Jack the Ripper case ==
Israel Schwartz, a man of "Jewish appearance", reported witnessing a woman being assaulted on Berner Street in the early morning of 30 September 1888. When the unknown man shouted out "Lipski!" to either Schwartz or another man, Schwartz fled. He later identified the woman as Elizabeth Stride, who is thought to have been murdered by Jack the Ripper around that time or shortly after. Police originally investigated whether there was someone in the neighbourhood by the name of Lipski. The murder of Miriam Angel had happened the year before only one street away on the same block. Police eventually decided that the term was being used as an ethnic slur against Jews, although several individuals with the surname Lipski resided in this area.
