= James Cutbush =

American chemist

- Born: 1788
- Died: 15 December 1823
- Occupation: Chemist

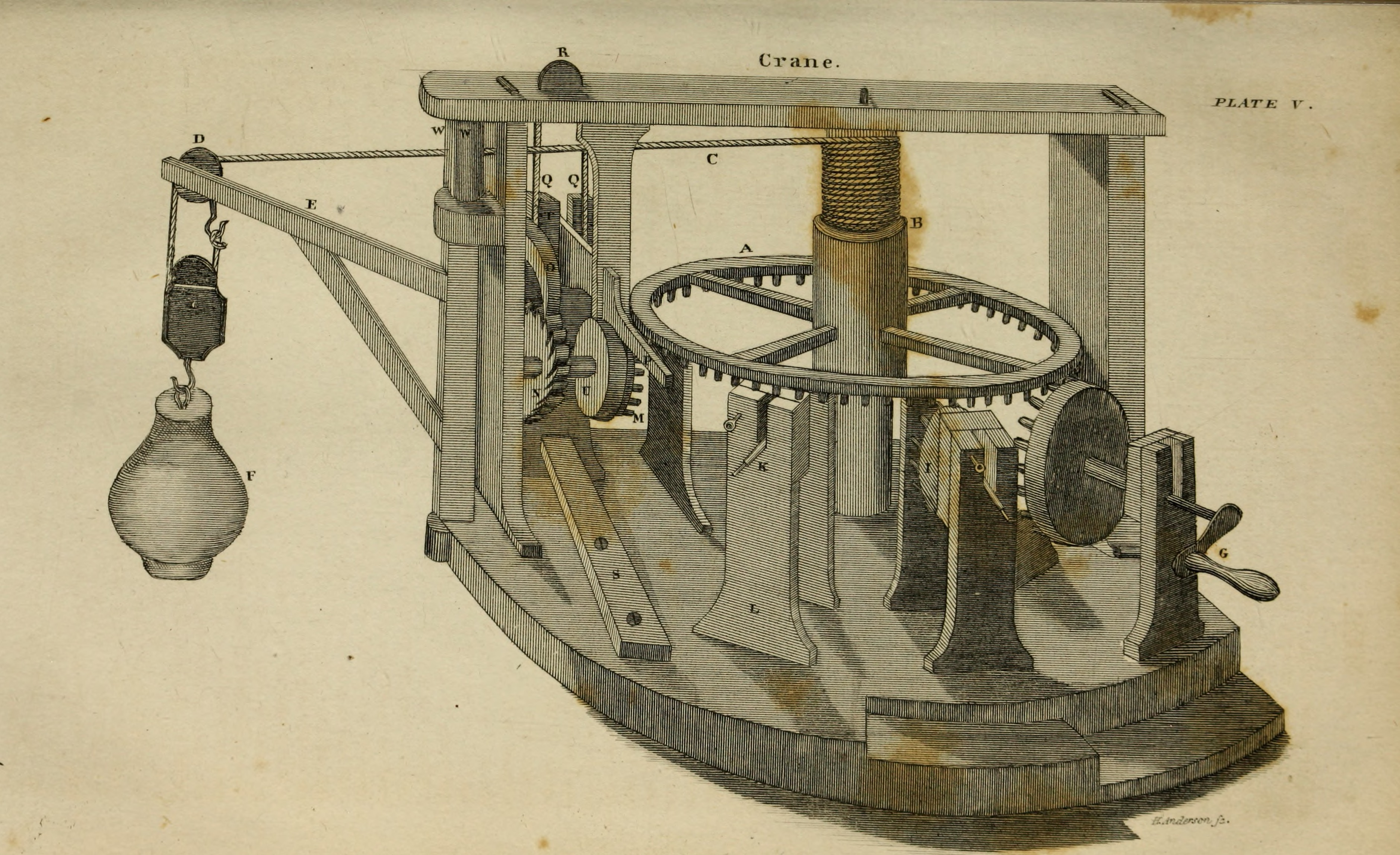
The American artist's manual, by James Cutbush, 1814

James Cutbush (1788 in Pennsylvania – 15 December 1823 at West Point, New York) was an American chemist.

Concerning his early history, very little is known, except that he taught chemistry. He was appointed to the United States Army with the rank of assistant apothecary-general in 1814, served first in Philadelphia, was afterward attached to the northern division of the Army, and was chief medical officer of the U. S. Military Academy and the Army post at West Point from June 1820 until November 1821. On the reorganization of the Army, he became assistant surgeon and acting professor of chemistry and mineralogy at West Point, in which capacity he continued until his death. He was president of the Columbian Chemical Society in Philadelphia.

In 1814, Cutbush was elected as a member of the American Philosophical Society.

== Works ==
He wrote several papers in the earlier volumes of Silliman's American Journal of Sciences,” and was the author of:

- Useful Cabinet (1808)
- Philosophy of Experimental Chemistry (1813)
- Treatise on Pyrotechnics (Philadelphia, 1825)

== Family ==
His brother Edward Cutbush was a noted surgeon and professor of chemistry.
