= Frederick Abberline =

English policeman (1843–1929)

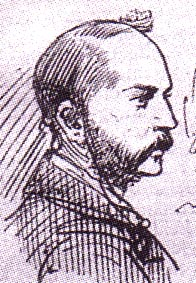
- An 1885 illustration of Abberline
- Born: Frederick George Abberline; 8 January 1843; Blandford Forum, Dorset, England
- Died: 10 December 1929 (aged 86); Springbourne, Hampshire, England
- Spouses: Martha Mackness (m. 1868; died 1868) Emma Beament (m. 1876)
- Police career
- Rank: Chief inspector for the London Metropolitan Police

Frederick George Abberline (8 January 1843 – 10 December 1929) was a British chief inspector for the London Metropolitan Police. He is best known for being a prominent police figure in the investigation into the Jack the Ripper serial killer murders of 1888.

== Early life ==
Born in Blandford Forum, Dorset, England, Abberline was the youngest son of Edward Abberline, a saddlemaker, sheriff's officer and clerk of the market, minor local government positions; and his wife Hannah (née Chinn). Edward Abberline died in 1849, and his widow opened a small shop and brought up her four children, Emily, Harriett, Edward and Frederick, alone.

== Police career ==
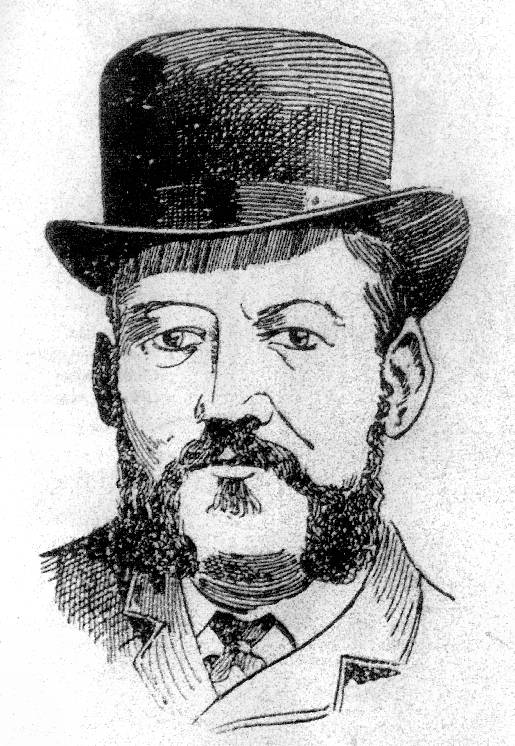
Frederick Abberline in January 1888

Frederick was a clockmaker until he left home to go to London, where he enlisted in the Metropolitan Police on 5 January 1863, being appointed to N Division (Islington) with the Warrant Number 43519. PC Abberline so impressed his superiors that they promoted him to Sergeant two years later on 19 August 1865. On his promotion he moved to Y Division (Highgate). Throughout 1867 he investigated Fenian activities as a plainclothes officer. He was promoted to Inspector on 10 March 1873, and three days later, on 13 March, transferred to H Division in Whitechapel. On 8 April 1878 Abberline was appointed Local Inspector in charge of H Division's CID.

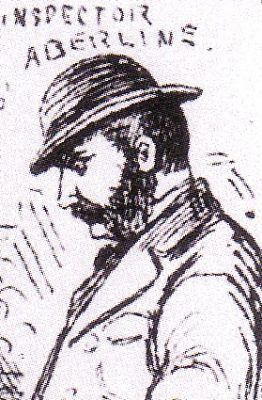
Frederick Abberline (The Illustrated Police News, November 1888)

On 26 February 1887 Abberline transferred to A Division (Whitehall), and then moved to CO Division (Central Office) at Scotland Yard on 19 November 1887, being promoted to Inspector First-Class on 9 February 1888 and to Chief Inspector on 22 December 1890. Following the murder of Mary Ann Nichols on 31 August 1888, Abberline was seconded back to Whitechapel due to his extensive experience in the area. He was placed in charge of the various detectives investigating the Ripper murders. Chief Inspector Walter Dew, then a detective constable in Whitechapel's H Division in 1888, knew Abberline and, while describing him as sounding and looking like a bank manager, also stated that his knowledge of the area made him one of the most important members of the Whitechapel murder investigation team.

Among the many suspects in the case, Abberline's primary suspect was George Chapman (Severin Antoniovich Klosowski). That theory was reiterated decades later by Robert Milne, who had recently retired from the Metropolitan Police Directorate of Forensic Services. He presented a paper about the case to the International Association for Identification Conference in 2011 and to the Chartered Society of Forensic Sciences in 2014, suggesting Chapman as the most likely the Ripper. Based on his expertise, review of investigation documents, and the use of geographical profiling software, he was convinced that the killer lived in the area of the murders. Chapman fit that bill accurately. Milne also pointed out that Chapman "a now known serial poisoner of women" ... "would go out carrying a small bag, not coming home until 4:30 a.m.", according to his estranged wife. In his 2014 paper, Milne also discussed a 1902 murder victim (1901 according to some sources), Mary Ann Austin, who had described a client before her death. According to Milne, "a Russian 5ft 7 inches tall with a black moustache [who] visited Mary and in the course of having sex stabbed her and tried to cut out her uterus". (Austin died of ten wounds to her abdomen, inflicted at Annie Chapman's former home, Crossingham's Lodging House, at 35 Dorset Street.)

Among Abberline's theories about the murders, one suggested that the crimes could have been perpetrated by a female killer.

Abberline was subsequently involved in the investigation of the Cleveland Street scandal in 1889. This case left him disenchanted with police work, convinced that there had been cover-ups by his superiors; if so, this was because, during the investigation, some sources claimed that the Duke of Clarence, Queen Victoria's grandson, had been a frequent visitor to the homosexual brothel on Cleveland Street. That was Abberline's last major case.

Chief Inspector Abberline retired from the police on 8 February 1892, having received 84 commendations and awards.

== Personal life ==
Abberline was married twice: once in March 1868 to 25-year-old Martha Mackness, the daughter of a labourer, from Elton, Northamptonshire; she died of tuberculosis two months after the marriage. On 17 December 1876 Abberline married 32-year-old Emma Beament, the daughter of a merchant, from Hoxton New Town, Shoreditch. The marriage lasted until Frederick's death over 50 years later. They had no children.

On his retirement from the Metropolitan Police, he returned to Bournemouth and was hired by the Pinkerton Detective Agency in 1904. Initially, he worked in casinos in Monte Carlo to find customers who were cheating. He then returned to England and continued working for the agency, until another retirement in 1904. He then bought a home, "Estcourt", 195 Holdenhurst Road, Springbourne, Bournemouth.

Abberline died on 10 December 1929, aged 86, just under three months before his wife Emma, and was buried in Bournemouth at Wimborne Road Cemetery. A blue plaque commemorating Abberline was unveiled at 195 Holdenhurst Road (now divided into flats) on 29 September 2001. In 2007, following a campaign for Abberline's unmarked grave to be recognised, and with the approval of his surviving relatives, a black granite headstone, inscribed and donated by a local stonemason, was erected on the grave where Abberline and Emma are buried.

== In film and fiction ==
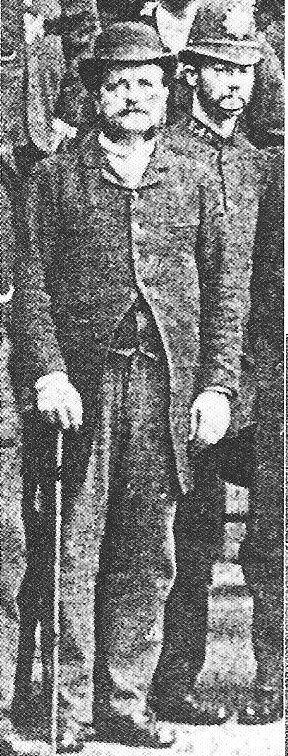
Detail from a group shot of H Division at Leman Street police station in London c. 1886. Authors Wolf Vanderlinden and Donald Rumbelow tentatively identify this as Abberline.

Several fictional retellings of the events surrounding the Jack the Ripper murders have cast Abberline in a lead role. The suggestion is often but erroneously made for the sake of drama that Abberline was unmarried and formed an attachment to one of the women connected to the events. The two most popular film depictions have also cast him as an addict, for which there is no known historical basis.

- Abberline was played by Michael Caine in the 1988 television miniseries Jack the Ripper. In this, the character was an aging alcoholic whose quest to solve the murders gives him the strength to give up drinking.
- A fictionalized Abberline was featured as the protagonist of Alan Moore and Eddie Campbell's graphic novel From Hell (1991–1999), and was subsequently portrayed by Johnny Depp in the film adaptation of that work (2001). The graphic novel paints him as a sulky but sympathetic policeman, different from his peers only in his moralism and being overweight, and takes pains to include little-known details of his life such as his involvement with the Pinkerton National Detective Agency. The film's version of Abberline was portrayed as an intelligent young detective who is ahead of his time in his deductive techniques. He is also portrayed as being clairvoyant, allowing the film-makers to ascribe to Abberline the contributions of spiritualist and psychic Robert James Lees, thus combining the two into one character and simplifying the graphic novel's narrative. Although Abberline is addicted to opium and drinks absinthe, he is a decent man who ultimately goes on a crusade against very powerful governmental and upper-class figures (the Monarchy and the Free Masons) to stop the grotesque murders of Jack the Ripper. In the film, Abberline also has a close relationship with Mary Kelly. The Ripper (a royal physician and Mason) kills a woman suspected to be Kelly, who Abberline helps to escape/relocate to prevent her from being killed by the Masons after the Ripper is defeated. Abberline, who has strong feelings for Kelly, is forced to never see her again out of fear that she will be discovered. He dies shortly thereafter of an opium overdose, which is implied to be suicide, or at least known to be a possibility, due to coins found in his hand intended for the boatman. In reality, he died of natural causes aged 86.
- Abberline was played by Gordon Christie in the 1973 television miniseries Jack the Ripper.
- In "The Ripper", an episode of the television series The Collector, Abberline was played by Robert Wisden.
- Abberline appears as a character in the anime series Black Butler named "Fred Abberline". While he is still involved in the Jack the Ripper case, this portrayal deviates heavily from the truth, not only by altering his family history (not married but engaged and with a twin brother), but also by placing his death sometime in 1889. However, the manga version of the story (and also the musicals) depicts him like a young enthusiastic and naive Scotland Yard agent who will become the successor of Lord Randall, the actual leader of Scotland Yard.
- Abberline, renamed Francis Aberline, appears as a major character in The Wolfman, played by Hugo Weaving.
- In the Fantasy Flight Games board game, Letters from Whitechapel (2011), Frederick Abberline features as a playable policeman - in which he has a corresponding portrait (under the name 'Frederich Abberline'). His colour scheme is red. Abberline even gains a unique set of traits in the Dear Boss expansion (2017).
- In BBC One's Ripper Street (2012), Abberline is played by Clive Russell.
- In the 2015 video game Assassin's Creed Syndicate, set in 1868, a young Abberline is featured as a supporting character, helping the protagonists, Evie and Jacob Frye, capture various Templar criminals throughout London and foil a plot to assassinate Queen Victoria by main antagonist, Crawford Starrick. Additionally, in the DLC named Jack the Ripper, set in 1888, Evie Frye helps Abberline solve a set of brutal murders committed by the infamous maniac to find her brother, Jacob.
- In the seventh series of the Jago and Litefoot science-fiction audio plays produced by Big Finish, Abberline appears as a character portrayed by Adrian Rawlins. In this story, Abberline is portrayed as having secretly captured 'Jack The Ripper', and recruits the title characters to help him in quietly recapturing the murderer after his escape.
