= Donald Rumbelow =

British historian of crime

Donald Rumbelow (born c.1940) is a British former City of London Police officer, crime historian, and former curator of the City of London Police's Crime Museum. He has twice served as chairman of the Crime Writers' Association.

== Career ==
Rumbelow currently acts as a London Tourist Board Blue Badged guide for the Jack the Ripper Walk, a walking tour in London that visits the locations associated with the crimes. He has appeared in several television documentaries examining the subject. In 2021, he was a regular contributor to Railway Murders.

In addition to his work on Jack the Ripper, he has also produced books and lectures on other aspects of London's crime history.

== Personal life ==
Rumbelow is married and has two children.

== Books by Donald Rumbelow ==
- Donald Rumbelow: I Spy Blue: Police and Crime in the City of London from Elizabeth I to Victoria, Macmillan, 1971
- Donald Rumbelow: Houndsditch Murders, Macmillan, 1973
- Donald Rumbelow: The Complete Jack the Ripper, London: W.H. Allen, 1975 (reprinted as Jack the Ripper: The Complete Casebook).
  - The Complete Jack the Ripper, fully revised and updated. 2004.
- Donald Rumbelow and Judy Hindley, illustrated by Colin King: Know How Book of Detection, Usborne Publishing Ltd, 1978
- Donald Rumbelow: Triple Tree, Harap, 1982
- Stewart P. Evans and Donald Rumbelow: Jack the Ripper: Scotland Yard Investigates, Sutton Publishing, 2007, ISBN 0-7509-4228-2
