= Robert Anderson (Scotland Yard official) =

British police officer (1841–1918)

Portrait by Walter Stoneman, c. 1916

Sir Robert Anderson KCB (29 May 1841 – 15 November 1918) was the second Assistant Commissioner (Crime) of the London Metropolitan Police, from 1888 to 1901. He was also an intelligence officer, theologian and writer.

== Early life and education ==
Anderson was born in Mountjoy Square in Dublin, Ireland. His father, Matthew Anderson, was Crown Solicitor, a distinguished elder in the Presbyterian Church of Ireland, and of Ulster Scots descent. Matthew married Mary, daughter of Samuel Lee of Derry. Robert described himself as "an anglicised Irishman of Scottish extraction". His elder brother Samuel Lee Anderson was a successful barrister who invariably acted for the Crown, and like his brother also acted as an intelligence officer. Their sister Annie married Sir Walter Boyd, 1st Baronet, a dominant figure among the Irish judiciary in the late nineteenth and early twentieth centuries, and a staunch upholder of British rule in Ireland. Annie played a key role in her brother's religious development.

On leaving school, Anderson began a business apprenticeship in a large brewery, but after eighteen months he decided not to go into business and left. After studying in Boulogne-sur-Mer and Paris, he entered Trinity College, Dublin, where he graduated Bachelor of Arts in 1862, and in 1863 was called to the Irish Bar. He received a Bachelor of Laws degree from Trinity College in 1875.

== Career ==
Anderson began to practice as a barrister. However, in 1865, his father showed him papers relating to the trials of Fenians and he too became involved in the operations against them, becoming the foremost expert on the Fenians and operations against them. In 1868, he was called to London, following the murder of a policeman in Manchester during a Fenian jailbreak in September 1867 (see Manchester Martyrs) and the bombing of Clerkenwell Gaol in another rescue attempt three months later (see Clerkenwell Outrage). In April 1868, he was attached to the Home Office as adviser on political crime.

However, although Anderson remained in this post, Fenianism became more or less dormant, and to justify his salary he was appointed secretary to several government inquiries. In 1877, he was appointed secretary to the new Prison Commission. In the early 1880s, however, the Fenians began operations again and in 1883, they commenced a bombing campaign in England. Anderson was not particularly effective in combating them, and in May 1884 he was forced to resign his Home Office post, to be replaced by Edward Jenkinson. In 1886, he was also removed from the Prison Commission.

In 1887, Jenkinson resigned, and Anderson was once again the only man available with experience in anti-Fenian activities. He was asked to assist James Monro, Assistant Commissioner (Crime) at Scotland Yard, in operations related to political crime. In 1888, Monro resigned (although he became Commissioner later that year), and Anderson replaced him as Assistant Commissioner, the post he was to hold for the rest of his career. Anderson retired in 1901, and was appointed Knight Commander of the Order of the Bath (KCB) in the King's Birthday Honours List in November 1901, having been appointed Companion of the Order of the Bath (CB) in 1896.

=== Jack the Ripper investigation ===
The Criminal Investigation Department (CID) was then just starting the investigation into the Jack the Ripper murders, which he thought were grossly over-sensationalized. Almost immediately after being promoted, Anderson went on vacation in Switzerland on doctor's orders, leaving the Metropolitan Police leaderless during the biggest challenge in its history. He was called back after a month because of increased bad publicity over the Ripper murders. About which, he later wrote, "When the stolid English go in for a scare, they take leave of all moderation and common sense. If nonsense were solid, the nonsense that was talked and written about those murders would sink a Dreadnought.” He also wrote that the victims "belonged to a very small class of degraded women who frequent the East End streets after midnight, in hope of inveigling belated drunkards, or men as degraded as themselves". He did not lead the Metropolitan Police to capture the killer.

== Religion ==
Anderson was brought up in a devout Christian home, but in his late teens, he had doubts about his faith. His sister Annie, later Lady Boyd, was influenced by the Irish Evangelical Revival of 1859–1860 and persuaded him to attend one of the services held in Dublin by the Reverend Joseph Denham Smith, but he was not particularly impressed. The following Sunday evening, however, he attended a service in his own church and heard the Reverend John Hall (afterwards of New York). Anderson later wrote that in that sermon Hall

boldly proclaimed forgiveness of sins, and eternal life as God's gift in grace, unreserved and unconditional, to be received by us as we sat in the pews. His sermon thrilled me, and yet I deemed his doctrine to be unscriptural. So I waylaid him as he left the vestry, and on our homeward walk I tackled him about his heresies... At last he let go my arm, and, facing me as we stood upon the pavement, he repeated with great solemnity his gospel message and appeal. 'I tell you,' he said, 'as a minister of Christ, and in His name, that there is life for you here and now if you will accept Him. Will you accept Christ, or will you reject Him?' After a pause – how prolonged I know not – I exclaimed, 'In God's name I will accept Christ.' Not another word passed between us; but after another pause he wrung my hand and left me. And I turned homewards with the peace of God filling my heart."

He was especially close to some of the greatest biblical teachers of his day, including James Martin Gray, Cyrus Scofield, A. C. Dixon, Horatius Bonar and E. W. Bullinger. He also preached with John Nelson Darby in the West of Ireland. Anderson was a member of the Plymouth Brethren, first with Darby then with the Open Brethren party, before returning to his Presbyterian roots. He wrote numerous theological works: C. H. Spurgeon commented that Anderson's book Human Destiny was "the most valuable contribution on the subject" that he had seen.

Today he is best known for his book, The Coming Prince, linked below, in which he explained the prophecy of the Book of Daniel 9:24. Daniel said the Jewish Messiah would come 483 years after the commandment (of Artaxerxes, king of Persia) to rebuild and restore Jerusalem. Anderson's calculations showed that Jesus Christ rode into Jerusalem to public acclaim, Luke 19, known as the Triumphal Entry, on the precise day that was prophesied by Daniel.

== Personal life and death ==
In 1873, he married Lady Agnes Alexandrina Moore, sister of Ponsonby Moore, 9th Earl of Drogheda. They had five children. In 1918, Anderson died from the Spanish flu, aged 77. They are buried in Kensal Green Cemetery.

On the floor of the House of Commons, W. H. Smith stated that Anderson "had discharged his duties with great ability and perfect faithfulness to the public". Raymond Blathwayt, in Great Thoughts, wrote: "Sir Robert Anderson is one of the men to whom the country, without knowing it, owes a great debt".

== Published works ==
=== Political subjects ===
- 'Sherlock Holmes as seen by Scotland Yard', T.P.s Weekly, 2 October 1903
- Criminals and Crime, 1907
- The Lighter Side of My Official Life. Hodder and Stoughton. 1910.
- Sidelights on the Home Rule Movement

=== Religious subjects ===
- The Bible and Modern Criticism
- Christianized Rationalism and the Higher Criticism: A reply to Professor Harnack's 'What is Christianity'
- Pseudo-Criticism, Or, the Higher Criticism and Its Counterfeit
- The Bible or the Church
- The Buddha of Christendom
- The Coming Prince
- Daniel in the Critics' Den'
- A Doubter's Doubts about Science and Religion' (reissued by Cambridge University Press, 2009, ISBN 978-1-108-00014-7)
- Entail of the Covenant also titled The Saviour's little Ones
- Forgotten Truths
- The Gospel and Its Ministry
- The Honour of His Name
- Human Destiny
- The Lord From Heaven
- Misunderstood Texts of the New Testament
- Pseudo-Criticism
- Redemption Truths
- The Silence of God
- Types in Hebrews
- Unfulfilled Prophecy
- The Way
- For Us Men (reissued as Redemption Truths by Morgan & Scott Ltd, 1910)
- In Defence: A Plea for the Faith

== Notes ==
Police appointments
Preceded by James Monro	Assistant Commissioner (Crime), Metropolitan Police; 1888–1901	Succeeded by Edward Henry
