= Joseph Barnett =

Joseph Barnett may refer to:

- Joseph Barnett (weightlifter)
- Joseph Barnett (Jack the Ripper suspect)
- Joseph H. Barnett, member of the South Dakota House of Representatives
- Joe Barnett, member of the Montana House of Representatives
- J. D. Barnett (Joseph Donald Barnett), American college basketball coach
