= George Hutchinson =

George Hutchinson may refer to:

- George Hutchinson (footballer, born 1872) (b 1872), goalkeeper for Manchester City, see List of Manchester City F.C. players (1–24 appearances)
- George Hutchinson (Australian rules footballer) (1874–1946), Australian footballer for Fitzroy in 1902
- George Hutchinson (English footballer) (1929–1996), English football (soccer) player
- George Hutchinson (politician) (1844–1923), Australian politician
- George B. Hutchinson (born 1953), American scholar
- George R. Hutchinson (1902–1989), American aviator
- George Hutchinson (Jack the Ripper suspect), a suspect in the Jack the Ripper case
- G. Evelyn Hutchinson (1903–1991), Anglo-American zoologist
- George Wylie Hutchinson, painter and illustrator

== See also ==
- George Hutchison (disambiguation)
