= Francis Spurzheim Craig =

British newspaper reporter and editor

Francis Spurzheim Craig (1837 — 8 March 1903) was a Victorian-era newspaper reporter and editor who was present during the inquests into the victims of Jack the Ripper. A theory by Dr. Wynne Weston-Davies argued that Craig was Jack the Ripper and his wife was Mary Jane Kelly, the Ripper's last victim.

== Early life ==
Craig was born in 1837 in Acton, London, the son of writer and phrenologist Edward T. Craig and his wife Mary.

== Career and marriage ==
Craig spent time in the United States between 1864 and 1866. By 1875, he was editor of the Bucks Advertiser and Aylesbury News, however, his career suffered a reverse when he was found to have been plagiarising his stories from The Daily Telegraph.

On 24 December 1884, Craig married Elizabeth Weston Davies at Hammersmith, London. They lived at Argyll Square in the King's Cross district of London. According to Wynne Weston-Davies, a relative of Elizabeth Davies, Craig discovered that his wife was engaging in prostitution and a divorce petition was filed in March 1886.{Divorce petition, National Archives. Craig (Petitioner) vs Craig (Respondent) and McBlain (Co-respondent) } In August 2015, there was a suggestion that Craig's wife and Mary Kelly were one and the same and that he was the Ripper. However, it has since been discovered that Elizabeth Weston Davies returned to Wales, where she had been born, and did not die until 1929.

Craig later became editor of the Indicator and West London News until 1896.

By the time of the 1901 census, Craig was boarding at 6 Carthew Road, Hammersmith.

== Death ==
In March 1903, Craig attempted to commit suicide at his lodgings at Carthew Road, Hammersmith, by slashing his throat with a razor. He left a note for his landlady that read: "I have suffered a deal of pain and agony". He died four days later on 8 March.
