= George Hutchins =

George Hutchins may refer to:

- Sir George Hutchins (lawyer) (died 1705), English lawyer and politician
- George Hutchins (priest) (1909–1977), archdeacon of Cheltenham
- George Hutchins, Gulf war veteran and U.S. congressional candidate, see United States House of Representatives elections in North Carolina, 2010

== See also ==
- George Hutchinson (disambiguation)
