= Mary Jane Kelly =

Irish murder victim (c. 1863 – 1888)

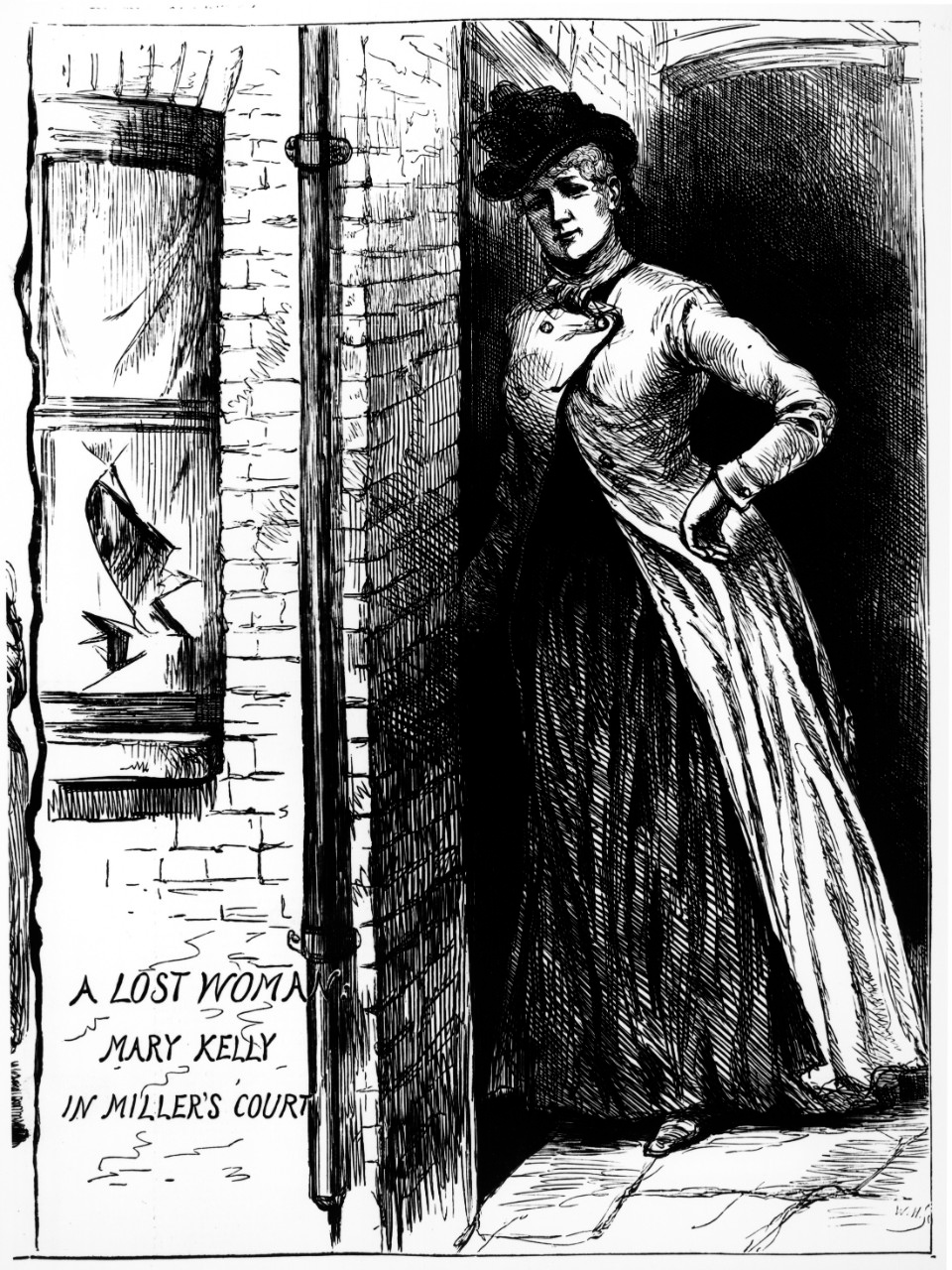
- 24 November 1888 Penny Illustrated Paper illustration of Kelly
- Born: c. 1863; County Limerick, Ireland
- Died: 9 November 1888 (aged about 25); Miller's Court, Spitalfields, London, England
- Cause of death: Haemorrhage due to severance of the carotid artery
- Body discovered: 13 Miller's Court, Dorset Street, Spitalfields, London; 51°31′7.16″N 0°4′30.47″W
- Resting place: St Patrick's Roman Catholic Cemetery, Leytonstone, London; 51.557194°N -0°E (common grave)
- Occupation: Prostitute
- Known for: Victim of serial murder

Mary Jane Kelly (c. 1863 – 9 November 1888), also known as Marie Jeanette Kelly, Fair Emma, Ginger, Dark Mary and Black Mary, is widely believed by scholars to have been the final victim of the unidentified serial killer Jack the Ripper, who murdered at least five women in the Whitechapel and Spitalfields districts of London from late August to early November 1888. At the time of her death, Kelly was approximately 25 years old, working as a prostitute and living in relative poverty.

Unlike the other four canonical Ripper victims – each of whom had been murdered outdoors and whose mutilations could have been committed within minutes – Kelly was murdered within the sparsely furnished single room she rented at 13 Miller's Court, affording her murderer an extensive period of time to eviscerate and mutilate her body. Kelly's body was by far the most extensively mutilated of the canonical victims, with her mutilations taking her murderer approximately two hours to perform.

== Early life ==
Compared with the other four canonical Ripper victims, Mary Kelly's origins are obscure and undocumented, and much of the information is possibly embellished. Kelly may have fabricated many details of her early life, as there is no corroborating documentary evidence, but there is no evidence to the contrary either. (Note: In 1965, a Spitalfields resident named Dennis Barrett, who knew Kelly as a boy, described her as "a mythomaniac ... incapable of stating a fact without embroidering upon it".) According to Joseph Barnett, the man she had most recently lived with prior to her murder, Kelly had told him she was born in Limerick, Ireland, in around 1863 – although whether she referred specifically to the city or the county more generally is not known – and that her family moved to Wales when she was a child. (Note: Contemporary 1863 birth records have revealed an infant named Mary Kelly was baptised in Castleconnell, County Limerick on 31 March 1863. According to a 2019 Irish Examiner news article, this child had numerous siblings, and the family later relocated to Carmarthen in search of work. However, the name Mary Kelly is a common Irish name, and it is unclear whether this individual is actually Mary Jane Kelly.)

Kelly is known to have claimed to one acquaintance that her parents had disowned her, although she remained on close terms with her sister. She described her family to Barnett as moderately wealthy, and both he and a reported former landlady of Kelly's, Mrs Carthy, claimed that Kelly came from a family of "well-to-do people". Barnett reported that Kelly had informed him her father was named John Kelly and that he worked in an ironworks in either Caernarfonshire or Carmarthenshire. Barnett also recalled Kelly mentioning having seven brothers and at least one sister. One brother, named Henry, supposedly served in the 2nd Battalion Scots Guards. She once stated to a friend named Lizzie Albrook that a female family member was employed at the London theatrical stage. Her landlord, John McCarthy, also claimed that Kelly received infrequent correspondence from Ireland.

Carthy described Kelly as "an excellent scholar and an artist of no mean degree". However, at the inquest into Kelly's murder, Barnett informed the coroner that in the months prior to her death she had often asked him to read newspaper reports of the Whitechapel murders to her, suggesting she was illiterate.

Newspaper accounts dating from November 1888 claim Kelly was known as "Mary McCarthy", which may have been a mix-up with either the surname of her landlord at the time of her death or the surname of a previous landlady with whom she had lived until about 1886.

== Appearance ==
Kelly has been reported as being a blonde or redhead, although her nickname "Black Mary" may suggest she had dark hair. Her eyes were blue. To some, Kelly was known as "Fair Emma", although it is unknown whether this applied to her hair colour, her skin colour, her beauty, or other qualities. Some contemporary newspapers report she was nicknamed "Ginger" after her hair (though sources disagree even on this point, thus leaving a description of hair colour ranging from ash blonde to dark chestnut).

Contemporary reports estimated Kelly's height at 5 ft 7 in (1.70 m). Detective Walter Dew, in his autobiography, claimed to have known Kelly well by sight. He described her as "quite attractive" and "a pretty, buxom girl". According to Dew, she always wore a clean white apron but never a hat. Sir Melville Macnaghten of the Metropolitan Police Force (who never saw Kelly prior to her death) said she had "considerable personal attractions". The Daily Telegraph of 10 November 1888 described her as "tall, slim, fair, of fresh complexion, and of attractive appearance".

== Marriage ==
When Kelly was aged approximately 16 in about 1879, she reportedly married a coal miner named Davis or Davies, who was killed two or three years later in a mining explosion. Without any means of financial support, Kelly relocated to Cardiff, where she lived with a cousin. Although there are no contemporary records of Kelly's presence in Cardiff, it is at this stage in her life that Kelly is considered to have begun working in prostitution, possibly being introduced to this profession by her cousin. No South Wales Police records exist to indicate Kelly was arrested for prostitution. (Note: Joseph Barnett would later state that Kelly had informed him she had spent eight or nine months in an infirmary in Cardiff.)

== Relocation to London ==
In 1884, Kelly apparently left Cardiff and relocated to London, where she briefly worked for a tobacconist in Chelsea before securing employment as a domestic servant while lodging in Crispin Street, Spitalfields. The following year, Kelly is believed to have relocated to the central London district of Fitzrovia.

Via her acquaintance with a young French woman whom Kelly had met in Knightsbridge, she found work in a high-class brothel in the more affluent West End of London. She became one of the brothel's most popular girls and spent her earnings on expensive clothing and hiring a carriage. Reportedly, Kelly was invited by a client named Francis Craig to France, but returned to England within approximately two weeks, having disliked her life there. However, by the time of her return to London, Kelly had adopted the French name "Marie Jeanette".

== East End ==
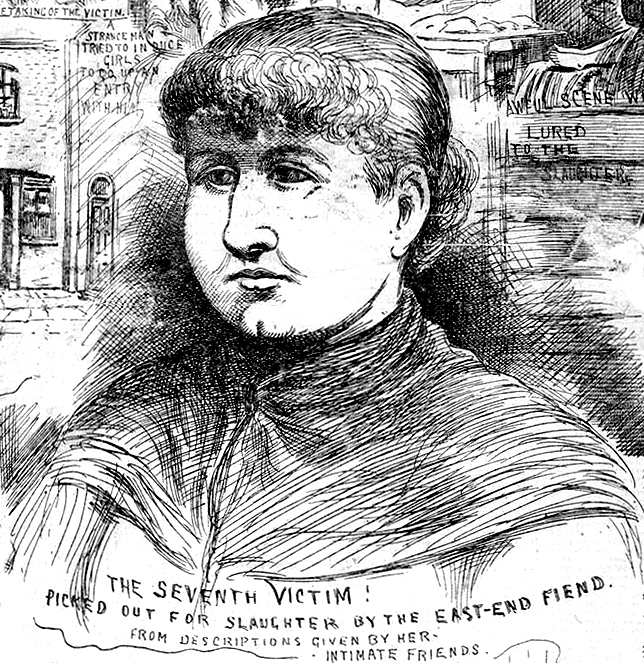
17 November 1888 Illustrated Police News illustration of Mary Jane Kelly

In 1885, Kelly briefly resided with a Mrs. Buki in lodgings near the London Docks North Quay. In the brief period of time she lodged with Buki, the two are known to have visited the home of a French lady living in Knightsbridge to demand the return of a box of expensive dresses belonging to Kelly. This information suggests Kelly's descent into East End life was markedly rapid and may have been influenced by her efforts to avoid retribution from a procurer. It is also believed to be at this stage in her life when Kelly began drinking heavily.

After leaving Buki's residence, Kelly lodged with a Mrs. Carthy in Breezer's Hill, Ratcliffe Highway. According to Carthy, Kelly lived at her residence between 1885 and 1886, before leaving to live with a builder whom Carthy thought would have married Kelly. Gravitating toward the poorer areas of the East End, Kelly reportedly lived with a man named Morganstone near the Commercial Gas Works in Stepney, and later with a mason's plasterer named Joseph Flemming.

== Acquaintance with Joseph Barnett ==
By 1886, Kelly was residing at Cooley's Lodging House in Thrawl Street, Spitalfields. On 8 April 1887, she became acquainted with 28-year-old Joseph Barnett, whom she first encountered on Commercial Street. Barnett – who worked as a fish porter at Billingsgate Market – took Kelly for a drink before arranging to meet her the following day.

=== Relationship and lodgings ===
The two agreed to live together upon their second meeting on 9 April. Initially, Barnett and Kelly lodged in George Street, close to Commercial Street. They later took lodgings in Little Paternoster Row, but were soon evicted for non-payment of rent and drunk and disorderly conduct. They then lodged in Brick Lane before relocating to Miller's Court, off Dorset Street, in either February or March 1888.

== 13 Miller's Court ==
In early 1888, Kelly and Barnett moved into 13 Miller's Court, a small, sparsely furnished single room at the back of 26 Dorset Street, Spitalfields. This room had once been the back parlour of 26 Dorset Street and was partitioned by a wooden wall. The weekly rent was 4s 6d.

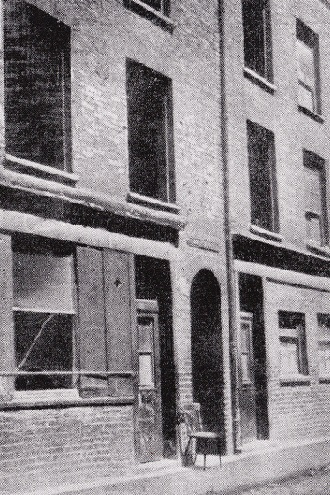
The passageway leading to Miller's Court, Spitalfields

Number 13 Miller's Court was a single 12 ft (3.7 m) square room, with a bed, three tables, and a chair. Above the fireplace hung a print of "The Fisherman's Widow", and a small tin bath was beneath the bed. Two irregularly sized windows faced the yard, in which the dustbin and water tap serving the property were located, and the door opened directly into the 26 ft (7.9 m)-long arched passageway which connected Miller's Court with Dorset Street. This door was illuminated at night by a gas lamp located almost directly opposite the door to the property.

Kelly had lost her door key, instead bolting and unbolting the door from outside by putting a hand through a broken window beside the door. (Note: The mechanism of the lock to the door of 13 Miller's Court is unknown. The lock is believed to have been either an automatic or spring lock which would automatically seal the door upon closure but be opened from the inside by simply turning a knob or lifting a latch, yet require a key to unlock from the outside.) A German neighbour, Julia Venturney, claimed Kelly had broken this window when drunk, and that a man's coat was frequently placed in the broken pane to act as a curtain and prevent draughts.

According to Kelly's friend and neighbour, Lizzie Albrook, Kelly was "heartily sick" of the life she was leading by 1888 and wished to return to Ireland "where her people lived". Her landlord, John McCarthy, later recollected: "She was a very quiet woman when sober but noisy when in drink." When drunk, Kelly would often be heard singing Irish songs, although when intoxicated, she would also become quarrelsome and abusive, which earned her the nickname "Dark Mary".

Barnett lost his employment as a fish porter in July 1888, reportedly due to committing theft. As a result, Kelly again resorted to prostitution. According to Barnett, she began to allow other prostitutes to sleep in their room on "cold, bitter nights" as she did not have the heart to refuse them shelter. Initially, Barnett tolerated this until he and Kelly quarrelled over her sharing the room with a prostitute he knew only as "Julia". Barnett subsequently left 13 Miller's Court on 30 October, more than a week before her death, taking lodgings at 24–25 New Street, Bishopsgate. Nonetheless, between 1 and 8 November, Barnett visited Kelly almost daily, occasionally giving her money.

=== 8 November ===
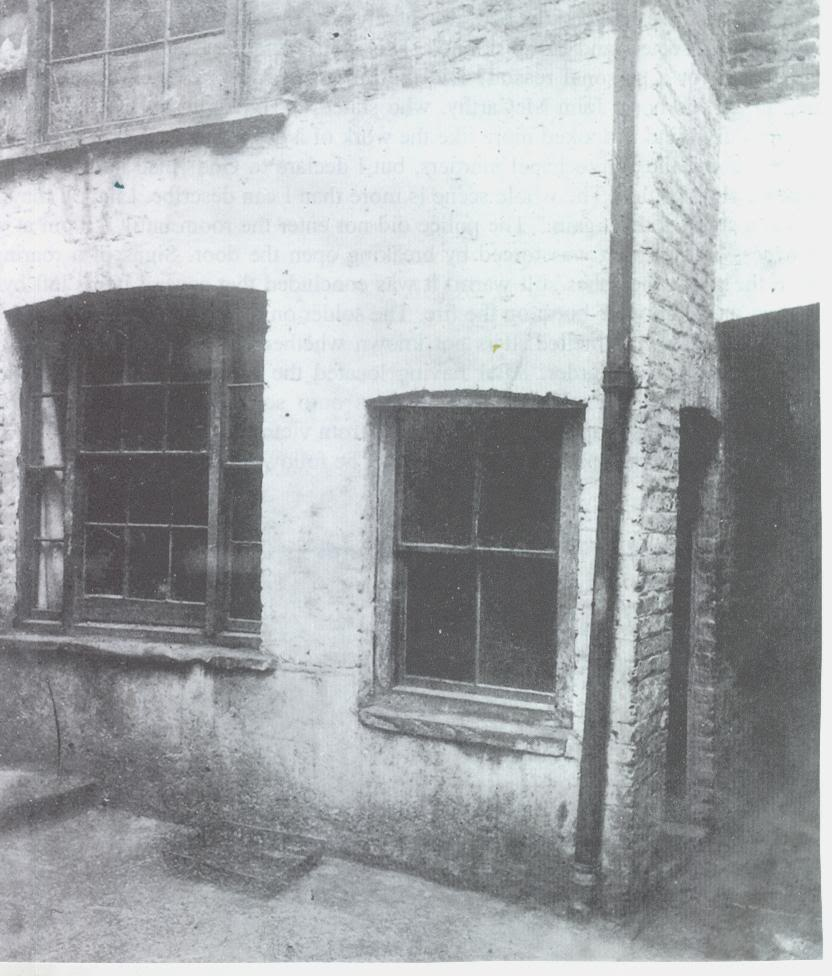
13 Miller's Court. The murder of Mary Jane Kelly occurred within this single room on 9 November 1888.

Barnett visited Kelly for the last time between 7 and 8 p.m. on 8 November. He found her in the company of a friend named Maria Harvey. Barnett did not stay long and apologised for having no money to give her. Both he and Harvey left Miller's Court at about the same time. Barnett returned to his lodging house, where he played cards with other residents until falling asleep at about 12:30 am. Shortly before Barnett left Miller's Court, Lizzie Albrook also visited Kelly. She later recollected that Kelly was sober, and one of the last things she said to her was: "Whatever you do, don't you do wrong and turn out as I have." In the early evening, Kelly had one drink in the Ten Bells public house with a woman named Elizabeth Foster. Later that evening, Kelly was seen drinking with two acquaintances at the Horn of Plenty pub on Dorset Street.

A fellow Miller's Court resident and prostitute, 31-year-old Mary Ann Cox, who described herself as "a widow and unfortunate", reported seeing Kelly returning home drunk and in the company of a stout, ginger-haired man, aged about 36, at 11:45 pm. He wore a black felt bowler hat, had a thick moustache, blotches on his face, and carried a can of beer. Cox and Kelly wished each other goodnight, with Kelly adding, "I am going to have a song." Kelly then entered her room with the man, who closed the door as Cox returned to her own lodgings at 5 Miller's Court. Kelly was then heard singing the song "A Violet from Mother's Grave". She was still singing when Cox left her lodgings at midnight, and when she returned at about 1 a.m. (Note: A fellow Miller's Court resident, Catherine Pickett, also heard Kelly singing in the early hours of 9 November. Pickett later testified she had been irritated by Kelly singing the song "A Violet I Plucked from Mother's Grave When a Boy" at about 12:30 a.m., and had intended to knock on her door to complain, but that she had been dissuaded from doing so by her husband.) Elizabeth Prater, who lived in the room directly above Kelly, went to bed at 1:30 am, by which time the singing had stopped.

=== 9 November ===
Unemployed labourer George Hutchinson, who knew Kelly, reported that the two had met at about 2 am on 9 November on Flower and Dean Street, and that Kelly asked him for a loan of sixpence. Hutchinson claimed to be broke, having spent his money in Romford the previous day. He later stated that as Kelly walked towards Thrawl Street she was approached by a man of "Jewish appearance" and aged about 34 or 35. Hutchinson claimed he was suspicious of this man because, although Kelly seemed to know him, the man's opulent appearance made him a suspicious character to be in the neighbourhood. The man had also made an obvious effort to disguise his features from Hutchinson by "[hiding] down his head with his hat over his eyes" as they passed him.

Hutchinson later gave the police an extremely detailed description of the man, down to the colour of his eyelashes, despite it being the early hours of the morning. He reported that he overheard the pair talking in the street opposite the court where Kelly was living; Kelly complained of losing her handkerchief, and the man gave her a red one of his own. Hutchinson claimed that he then heard Kelly say: "Alright my dear, come along. You will be comfortable." She and the man walked into 13 Miller's Court, and Hutchinson followed them. He saw neither one of them again, laying off his watch at about 2:45 a.m. (Note: Hutchinson only reported this information to the police after the inquest into Kelly's murder had been concluded on 12 November.)

Hutchinson's statement appears to be partly corroborated by a laundress named Sarah Lewis, who reported that as she walked towards the courtyard at 2:30 am to spend the night with her friends, the Keylers, who lived at 2 Miller's Court, she had seen two or three people standing near the Britannia pub, including a respectably dressed young man with a dark moustache talking with a woman. Both appeared to be drunk. A poorly dressed and hatless young woman also stood nearby. Opposite Miller's Court, Lewis saw a "stout-looking and not very tall" man standing at the entrance to the courtyard, watching the entranceway. (Note: Serious discrepancies exist with Hutchinson's account of both his movements and observations in the early hours of 9 November. The individual Lewis observed may have been the individual seen earlier in Kelly's company or another man altogether.) As Lewis passed this man, she saw a man in the company of an obviously drunk woman further up the courtyard. Lewis was adamant about the timing of these sightings as she recalled hearing the chiming of the Spitalfields Church clock.

Shortly after 1 am, Mary Ann Cox again left her room. She returned home at about 3 am. Cox reported hearing no sound and seeing no light from Kelly's room at this time, although she thought she heard someone leaving the residence at about 5:45 am.

== Murder ==
Elizabeth Prater, who lived in the room directly above Kelly's and who had been awoken by her kitten walking over her neck, and Sarah Lewis, who had slept at 2 Miller's Court on 8–9 November, both reported hearing a faint cry of "Murder!" between 3:30 am and 4 am. Neither reacted, as they said it was common to hear such cries in the East End. Lewis described the cry as "only one scream. I took no notice of it". She claimed not to have slept and to have heard people moving in and out of the court throughout the night. Prater left her room at about 5:30 am to walk to the Ten Bells pub for a drink of rum. She saw nothing suspicious.

=== Discovery ===
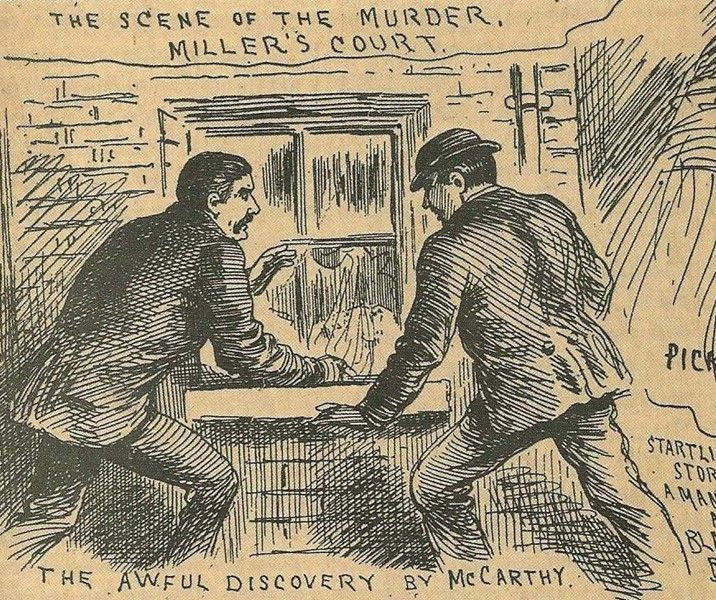
17 November 1888 Illustrated Police News sketch depicting Thomas Bowyer and John McCarthy's discovery of Kelly's body

On the morning of 9 November 1888, the day of the annual Lord Mayor's Day celebrations, Kelly's landlord, John McCarthy, sent his assistant, ex-soldier Thomas Bowyer, to collect the rent. Kelly was six weeks behind on her payments, owing 29 shillings. Shortly after 10:45 am, Bowyer knocked on her door but received no response. He tried the handle and found the door locked, then looked through the keyhole but could not see anyone inside. Pushing aside the clothing used to plug the broken windowpane and the muslin curtains covering the windows, Bowyer looked into the room and saw Kelly's extensively mutilated corpse lying on the bed. She is believed to have died between three and nine hours before the discovery.

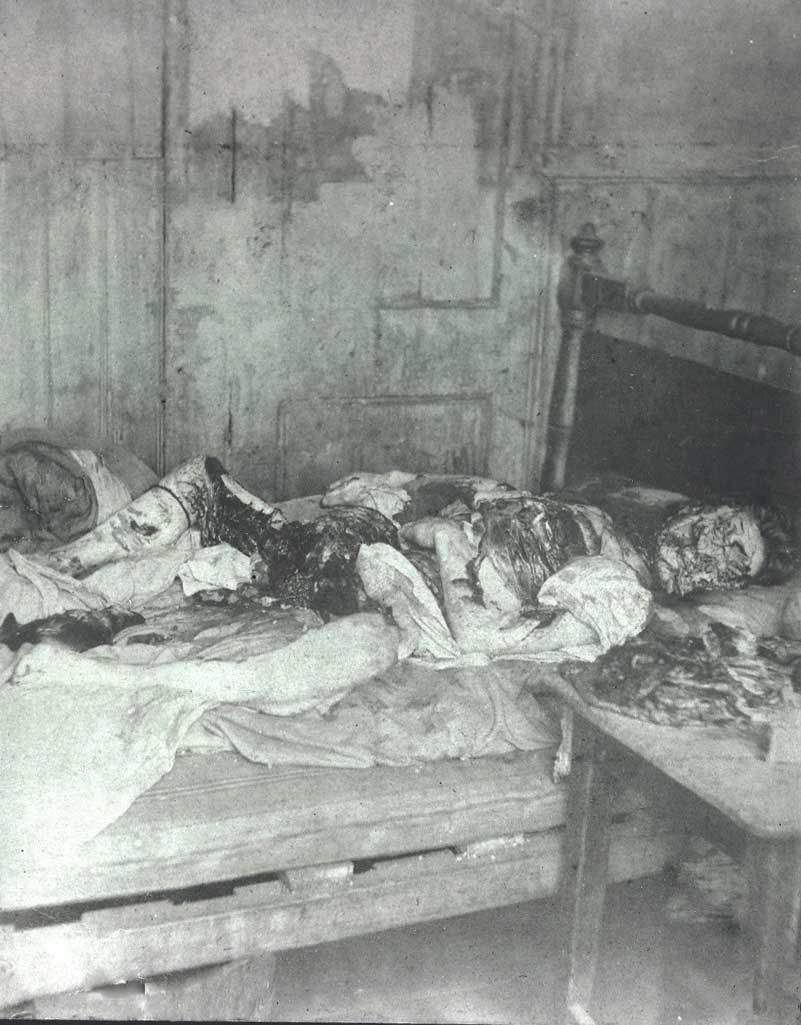
The body of Mary Jane Kelly as discovered in Miller's Court

Bowyer ran to report his discovery to McCarthy, who verified his account and told him to inform the Commercial Street Police Station. Bowyer ran to the station, stammering: "Another one. Jack the Ripper. Awful. [John] McCarthy sent me" to Inspector Walter Beck. Beck accompanied Bowyer to Miller's Court and immediately requested the assistance of police surgeon George Bagster Phillips. (Note: Three further doctors–Thomas Bond, Frederick Gordon Brown, and John Reese Gabe–also attended the crime scene to assist Phillips.) He also ordered that no one enter or leave the yard, arranged for news of the murder to be telegraphed to Scotland Yard, and requested bloodhounds. Superintendent Thomas Arnold and Inspector Edmund Reid from Whitechapel's H Division, as well as Frederick Abberline and Robert Anderson from Scotland Yard, attended the scene between 11:30 am and 1 pm. (Note: The delay in the police entering Kelly's room after Thomas Bowyer had reported the murder at the Commercial Street Police Station was due to the fact the Commissioner of the Metropolitan Police, Sir Charles Warren, had also considered using bloodhounds to try to trace the killer and thus did not want the crime scene disturbed until tracker dogs could be brought to the scene.)

News of the discovery of another Ripper victim spread rapidly throughout the East End. Crowds estimated to number more than 1,000 gathered at each end of Dorset Street, with many members of the public expressing frustration and indignation.

Arnold ordered the room broken into at 1:30 pm after the possibility of tracking the murderer with bloodhounds was dismissed as impractical. A fire fierce enough to melt the solder between a kettle and its spout had burnt in the grate, apparently fuelled with women's clothing. (Note: At the inquest into Kelly's murder, Inspector Frederick Abberline testified to discovering "a portion of the brim of a hat" in the grate of this fire, suggesting the perpetrator may have also burned his own hat in the fireplace.) Inspector Abberline thought Kelly's clothes were burnt by the murderer to provide light, as the room was otherwise only dimly lit by a single candle Kelly had bought on 7 November. (Note: The Manchester Guardian of 10 November 1888 reported that Sgt Edward Badham accompanied Inspector Beck to the site of 13 Miller's Court after they were both notified of Kelly's murder by Thomas Bowyer. Beck testified the inquest into Kelly's murder that he was the first police officer at the scene and that Badham may have accompanied him, but there are no official records to confirm Badham being with him.)

After two official crime scene photographs had been taken, Kelly's body was taken from Miller's Court to the mortuary in Shoreditch, where she was formally identified by Joseph Barnett, who recognised her only by "the ear and the eyes". John McCarthy also viewed the body and was certain the deceased was Kelly.

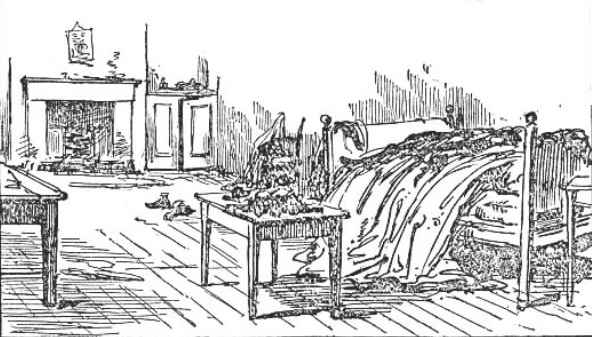
Contemporary illustration of the layout of 13 Miller's Court as discovered by Thomas Bowyer

== Post-mortem ==
The mutilation of Kelly's corpse was the most extensive of any of the Whitechapel murders, likely because the murderer had more time to commit his atrocities in a private room without fear of discovery over an extended period, rather than in public areas. The autopsy took two-and-a-half hours to complete. (Note: Some sources state Kelly's autopsy took six-and-a-half hours to complete.)

Thomas Bond and George Bagster Phillips examined the body. Phillips and Bond timed her death to about 12 hours before the examination. Phillips suggested that the extensive mutilations would have taken two hours to perform, and Bond noted that rigor mortis set in as they were examining the body, indicating that death occurred between 2 and 8 am. Bond's official documents relating to his examination of the decedent, the crime scene, and subsequent post-mortem state:

The body was lying naked in the middle of the bed, the shoulders flat but the axis of the body inclined to the left side of the bed. The head was turned on the left cheek. The left arm was close to the body with the forearm flexed at a right angle and lying across the abdomen. The right arm was slightly abducted from the body and rested on the mattress. The elbow was bent, the forearm supine with the fingers clenched. The legs were wide apart, the left thigh at right angles to the trunk and the right forming an obtuse angle with the pubis.
The whole of the surface of the abdomen and thighs was removed and the abdominal cavity emptied of its viscera. The breasts were cut off, the arms mutilated by several jagged wounds and the face hacked beyond recognition of the features. The tissues of the neck were severed all round down to the bone.
The viscera were found in various parts viz: the uterus and kidneys with one breast under the head, the other breast by the right foot, the liver between the feet, the intestines by the right side and the spleen by the left side of the body. The flaps removed from the abdomen and thighs were on a table.
The bed clothing at the right corner was saturated with blood, and on the floor beneath was a pool of blood covering about two feet square. The wall by the right side of the bed and in a line with the neck was marked by blood which had struck it in several places.
The face was gashed in all directions, the nose, cheeks, eyebrows, and ears being partly removed. The lips were blanched and cut by several incisions running obliquely down to the chin. There were also numerous cuts extending irregularly across all the features.
The neck was cut through the skin and other tissues right down to the vertebrae, the fifth and sixth being deeply notched. The skin cuts in the front of the neck showed distinct ecchymosis. The air passage was cut at the lower part of the larynx through the cricoid cartilage.
Both breasts were more or less removed by circular incisions, the muscle down to the ribs being attached to the breasts. The intercostals between the fourth, fifth, and sixth ribs were cut through and the contents of the thorax visible through the openings.
The skin and tissues of the abdomen from the costal arch to the pubes were removed in three large flaps. The right thigh was denuded in front to the bone, the flap of skin, including the external organs of generation, and part of the right buttock. The left thigh was stripped of skin fascia, and muscles as far as the knee.
The left calf showed a long gash through skin and tissues to the deep muscles and reaching from the knee to five inches above the ankle. Both arms and forearms had extensive jagged wounds.
The right thumb showed a small superficial incision about one inch long, with extravasation of blood in the skin, and there were several abrasions on the back of the hand moreover showing the same condition.
On opening the thorax it was found that the right lung was minimally adherent by old firm adhesions. The lower part of the lung was broken and torn away. The left lung was intact. It was adherent at the apex and there were a few adhesions over the side. In the substances of the lung, there were several nodules of consolidation.
The pericardium was open below and the heart absent. In the abdominal cavity, there was some partly digested food of fish and potatoes, and similar food was found in the remains of the stomach attached to the intestines. (Note: The autopsy report pertaining to Mary Jane Kelly was considered lost until 1987, when the original documents were anonymously returned to Scotland Yard.)

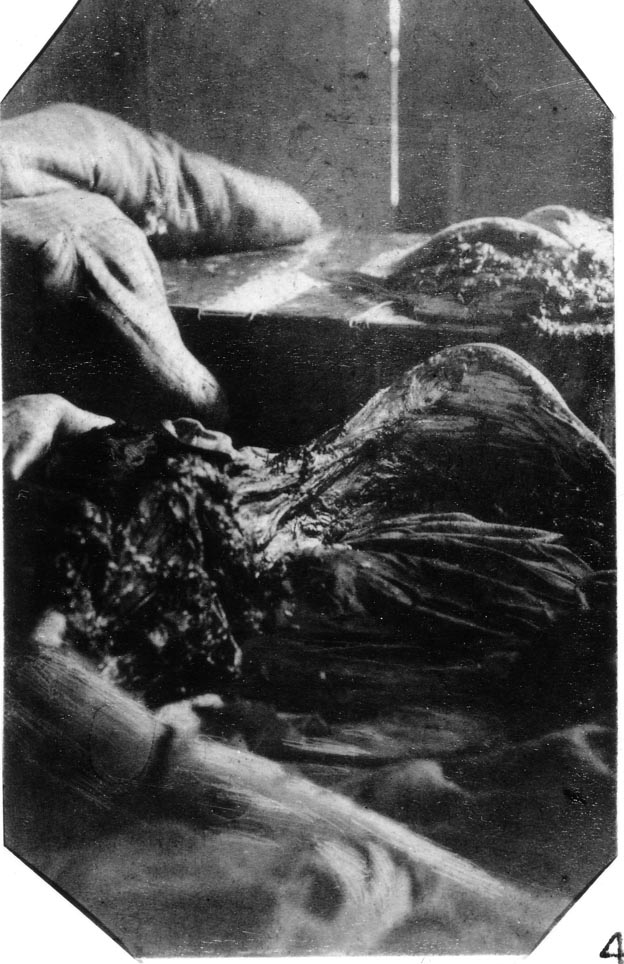
Crime scene photograph of Mary Jane Kelly, depicting the mutilation inflicted to her lower abdomen, groin and thighs

Phillips believed that Kelly had been killed by a slash to the throat, with the mutilations performed afterwards. Bond stated in a report that the knife used was about 1 in (25 mm) wide and at least 6 in (150 mm) long, but did not believe the murderer had any medical training or knowledge. He wrote:

In each case the mutilation was inflicted by a person who had no scientific nor anatomical knowledge. In my opinion, he does not even possess the technical knowledge of a butcher or horse slaughterer or a person accustomed to cut up dead animals.

== Inquest ==
The official inquest into Kelly's death opened at Shoreditch Town Hall on Monday 12 November. It was presided over by the coroner for North East Middlesex, Roderick Macdonald, MP. The jury were sworn before being taken by Inspector Abberline to view Kelly's body at the mortuary adjoining Shoreditch Church and the crime scene in Miller's Court. After about one hour, the jurors reconvened at Shoreditch Town Hall to hear witness testimony.

=== Character testimony ===
The first witness to testify was Joseph Barnett. He said he had lived with Kelly for "one year and eight months" before they separated following a quarrel on 30 October over her allowing "a woman of bad character" to stay in her room, whom Kelly "took in out of compassion". Barnett said that, despite this argument, he had remained on good terms with Kelly in the week after their separation, and that he had last seen her alive at about 7:45 pm on 8 November. On this final occasion, she had been "quite sober".

Barnett described Kelly's Irish origins, her marriage at age 16, and her move to Cardiff after her husband's death. He also emphasised his belief that Kelly's cousin was the source of her leading a life of prostitution, stating: "She was following a bad life with her cousin, who, as I reckon, and as I often told her, was the cause of her downfall."

Thomas Bowyer then recounted his discovery of Kelly's body on 9 November. He said he had first seen two pieces of flesh on the bedside table, then Kelly's extensively mutilated body. He "at once went very quietly" to John McCarthy to inform him. McCarthy looked through the broken windowpane to verify Bowyer's account before they separately went to the nearest police station to report the discovery.

Bowyer's testimony was corroborated by McCarthy, who said Bowyer had told him: "Guv'nor, I knocked at the door, and could not make anyone answer. I looked through the window and saw a lot of blood." They reported the discovery to Inspector Reid at Commercial Street Police Station. McCarthy said Kelly's rent was in arrears by 29 shillings. Discussing her character, McCarthy described Kelly as an "exceptionally quiet woman" when sober, but said that "when in drink she had a lot more to say".

Mary Ann Cox also testified. She said she had known Kelly for eight or nine months, and had last seen her alive in Dorset Street at 11:45 pm on 8 November, "very much intoxicated". Kelly had been wearing a red pelerine and a shabby skirt. Cox said Kelly had been with a short, stout and shabbily dressed man who had a pot of ale in his hand. Cox heard no sound from Kelly's room when she returned to her own room at 5 Miller's Court at 3 am. The next witness, Elizabeth Prater, said she had heard a "suppressed cry" of "Oh! Murder!" at about 3:45 am, although she said such cries were commonplace in Spitalfields. Caroline Maxwell and Sarah Lewis also testified. Maxwell said she had seen Kelly alive on the morning of 9 November; Lewis testified to having seen a stout man in a black wideawake hat standing in the courtyard in the early hours and to hearing a woman cry "Murder!" at "nearly four".

=== Medical testimony ===
Shortly after Lewis's testimony, Phillips described his examination of the body at 13 Miller's Court. He said he arrived at the crime scene at 11:45 am and examined the body at 1:30 p.m. Kelly was lying "two-thirds over, towards the edge of the bedstead", and Phillips was certain the murderer had moved her body to perform the eviscerations. The initial attack had taken place as Kelly lay on the right side of the bed, and the cause of death was the severance of her right carotid artery. This conclusion was supported by a large quantity of blood under the bedstead and the palliasse, pillow and sheet at the top of the bed being saturated with blood. Blood spatterings on the wall on the right side of the bed, in line with Kelly's neck, also supported this conclusion.

Phillips estimated Kelly's death occurred between 2 am and 8 am. Her last meal consisted of fish and potatoes, which had partly passed into her intestines, indicating she had last eaten between 10 pm and 11 pm on 8 November. The superficial cut to her right thumb might have been caused while attempting to defend herself. The blade used for the mutilations was at least six inches (15 cm) long and one inch (25 mm) wide.

=== Police testimony ===
After further eyewitness and character testimony from Julia Venturney and Maria Harvey, Inspectors Beck and Abberline testified about their response and examination of the crime scene. Beck described the orders he had given for a police surgeon to attend, his efforts to retrieve evidence, and his instructions preventing members of the public from entering Miller's Court or residents from leaving until all had been questioned. Abberline said Superintendent Arnold had ordered the door of Kelly's room to be forced open with a pickaxe at 1:30 pm. He also described his examination of the room, adding his opinion that the large amount of clothing in the fireplace had been burned by Kelly's murderer to provide enough light to mutilate her body, as the sole source of light in the room had been a single candle placed on top of a broken wine glass.

== Conclusion ==
Abberline was the last of 12 witnesses to testify at the inquest, and the hearings were completed in a single day. At the close of the hearings, Macdonald instructed the jury whether they should adjourn to hear further testimony at a later date or close the procedures. He said: "My own opinion is that it is very unnecessary for two courts to deal with these cases, and go through the same evidence, time after time, which only causes expense and trouble. If the coroner's jury can come to a decision as to the cause of death, then that is all that they have to do ... From what I learn, the police are content to take the future conduct of the case. It is for you to say whether you will close the inquiry today; if not, we shall adjourn for a week or fortnight, to hear the evidence that you may desire." (Note: The duration of the inquest into Kelly's murder was severely criticised in the press. On 14 November, The Daily Telegraph published an article which observed that "comparatively little" new information had been elicited at the inquest, that the proceedings had terminated before any further witnesses or evidence could be presented, and before Kelly's relatives could be located to formally identify her body.)

Following a short deliberation, the jury returned a unanimous verdict: "Wilful murder against some person or persons unknown."

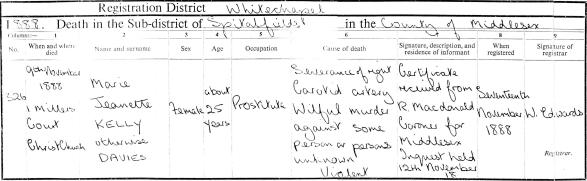
Death certificate of Mary Jane Kelly, issued 17 November 1888

Kelly's death certificate was issued on 17 November. It records her name as "Marie Jeanette Kelly" and lists her age as "about 25 years".

== Investigation ==
Police conducted extensive house-to-house enquiries and searches. The wife of a local lodging-house deputy, Caroline Maxwell, claimed to have seen Kelly alive at about 8:30 am on the morning of her murder, although she admitted to having only met Kelly on one or two previous occasions; moreover, her description did not match that of those who knew Kelly more closely. Maurice Lewis, a tailor, reported seeing Kelly at about 10:00 am that same morning in a pub. Both statements were dismissed by the police since they did not fit the officially estimated time of death; moreover, they could find no other eyewitnesses to confirm these reports. Maxwell may have either mistaken someone else for Kelly or confused the actual day she had seen her. (Note: Such confusion was used as a plot device in the graphic novel From Hell (and the subsequent movie adaptation).)

On 10 November, Bond wrote a report officially linking Kelly's murder with four previous ones to occur in and around Whitechapel – those of Mary Ann Nichols, Annie Chapman, Elizabeth Stride and Catherine Eddowes. Bond also provided an offender profile of the murderer, which suggested the perpetrator was a solitary, eccentric individual who was subject to periodic attacks of homicidal and erotic mania, and who had been in an extreme state of satyriasis as he performed the mutilations upon Kelly and the four previous victims. On the same day, the Commissioner of the Metropolitan Police, Sir Charles Warren, issued a pardon for "any accomplice, not being a person who contrived or actually committed the murder, who shall give such information and evidence as shall lead to the discovery and conviction of the person or persons who committed the murder [of Mary Jane Kelly]". Despite this offer, no-one was ever charged with any of the murders.

No murders with a similar modus operandi were committed for over six months, as a result of which the police investigation into the Ripper murders was gradually wound down and press interest declined. Kelly is generally considered to have been the Ripper's final victim, and it is assumed that the crimes ended because of the culprit's death, imprisonment, institutionalisation, or emigration.

=== Joseph Barnett ===
The detective in charge of the investigation, Frederick Abberline, questioned Kelly's former partner and roommate, Joseph Barnett, for four hours after her murder. His clothes were also examined for bloodstains, but he was released without charge. Abberline's investigation appears to have completely exonerated Barnett.

A century after the murder, authors Paul Harrison and Bruce Paley proposed Barnett killed Kelly in a fit of jealous rage, possibly because she had scorned him. Harrison and Paley also suggested that he committed the previous murders to scare Kelly off the streets and away from prostitution. Other authors suggest Barnett killed Kelly only and had extensively mutilated her body to make the crime resemble a Ripper murder. The state of undress of Kelly's body, and her folded clothes on a chair, have led to suggestions that she undressed herself before lying down on the bed, which would indicate that she was either killed by someone she knew or believed to be a client.

The door to Kelly's property was locked after her murder, indicating the murderer either had possession of the key or knew how to reach through the broken windowpane to lock and unlock the door. However, the perpetrator would likely have observed Kelly reaching through the windowpane to unlock the door prior to inviting him into the room.

Other acquaintances of Kelly's put forward as her murderer include her landlord John McCarthy and her former boyfriend Joseph Fleming.

=== George Hutchinson ===
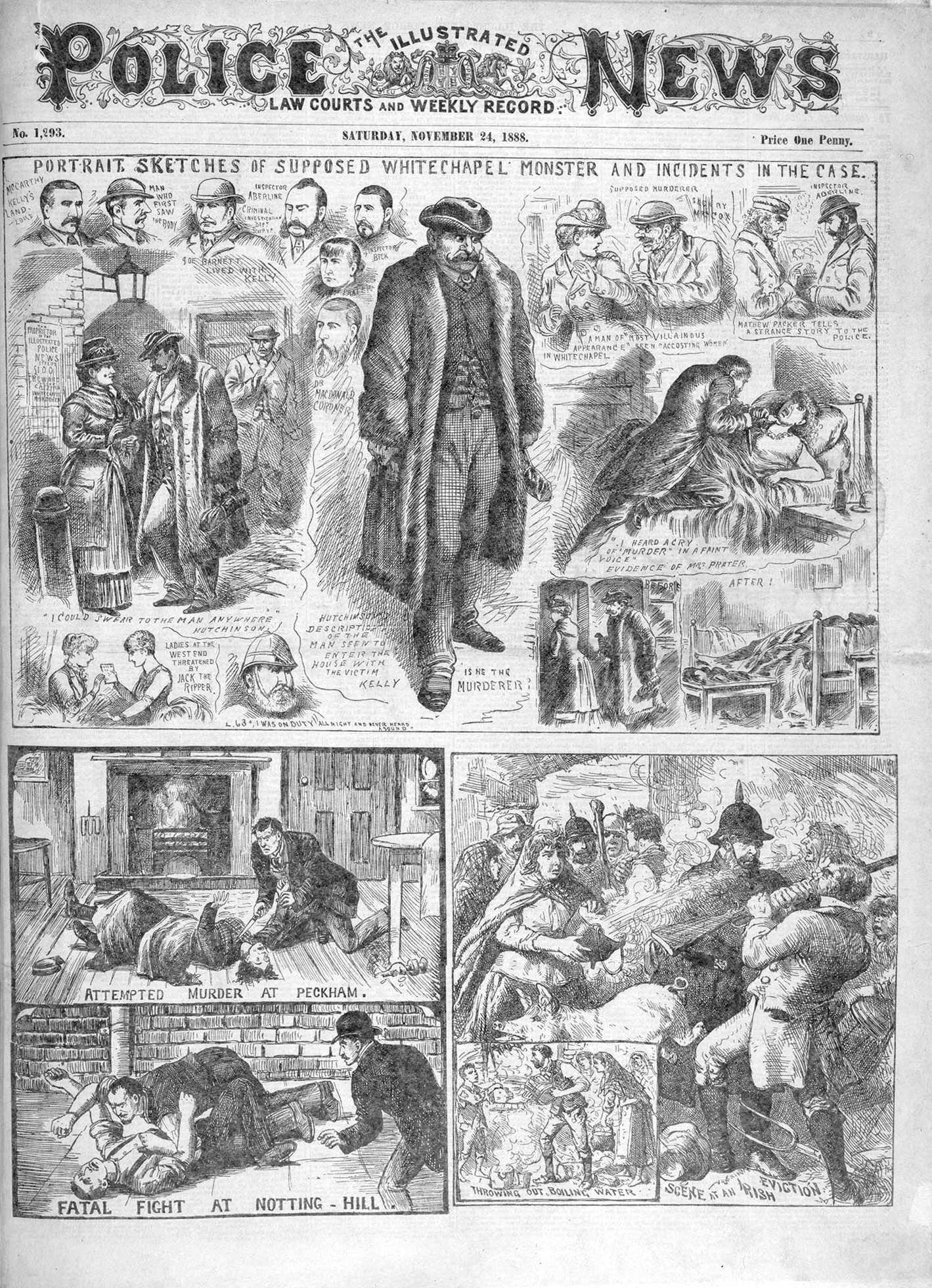
24 November 1888 edition of The Illustrated Police News, depicting George Hutchinson's description of the individual in Kelly's company at 2:45 a.m. on the morning of her murder.

George Hutchinson only provided his eyewitness information to Sgt Edward Badham on 12 November. Inspector Abberline described Hutchinson's statement as important to the investigation. Hutchinson unsuccessfully accompanied police around Whitechapel and Spitalfields in efforts to identify this man. Hutchinson's name does not appear again in the existing police records, and so it is not possible to say with certainty whether his evidence was ultimately dismissed, disproven, or corroborated. (Note: Edward Badham was on duty at Commercial Street Police Station on the evening of 12 November 1888 when, at around 6 p.m., George Hutchinson arrived at the station to give his initial eyewitness statement. The inquest into the death of Mary Kelly had been completed earlier that day.)

In his memoirs, Walter Dew discounts Hutchinson on the basis that his sighting may have been on a different day, and not the morning of the murder. Robert Anderson, head of the CID, later claimed that the only witness who got a good look at the killer was a Jew who had observed a previous victim with her murderer. Hutchinson was not a Jew, and thus not that witness. Some modern scholars have suggested that Hutchinson was the Ripper himself, trying to confuse the police with a false description, but others suggest he may have just been an attention seeker who made up a story he hoped to sell to the press.

== Other theories ==
A small minority of modern authors consider it possible that Kelly was not a victim of the same killer as the other canonical victims of Jack the Ripper. At an assumed age of 25, Kelly was considerably younger than the other canonical victims, all of whom were in their 40s. In addition, the mutilations inflicted on Kelly were far more extensive than those on other victims. However, Kelly was also the only victim killed in the privacy of a room instead of outdoors. Her murder was separated by five weeks from the previous killings, all of which had occurred within the span of a month.

Writer Mark Daniel proposed that Kelly's murderer was a religious maniac who killed Kelly as part of a ritual sacrifice, and that the fire in the grate was not to provide light but was used to make a burnt offering. In 1939, author William Stewart proposed that Kelly was killed by a deranged midwife, dubbed "Jill the Ripper", whom Kelly had engaged to perform an abortion. According to Stewart, the murderer had burned her own clothes in the grate because they were bloodstained and had then made her escape wearing Kelly's clothes. This, he suggested, was why Caroline Maxwell had claimed to have seen Kelly the morning of her murder, and that Maxwell had actually seen the killer dressed in Kelly's clothes. However, the medical reports, which were not available when Stewart constructed his theory, make no mention of pregnancy, and the theory is entirely based on speculation.

I knew Mary Jane Kelly very well, as we were near neighbours. The last time I saw her was on Thursday night at about eight o'clock when I left her in her room with Joe Barnett, who had been living with her. About the last thing she said to me was, "Whatever you do, don't you do wrong and turn out as I have." She had often spoken to me in this way and warned me against going on the streets as she had done. She told me, too, that she was heartily sick of the life she was leading and wished she had money enough to go back to Ireland where her people lived. I don't believe she would have gone out as she did if she had not been obliged to do so to keep herself from starvation.

— Lizzie Albrook. Friend and neighbour of Mary Jane Kelly, discussing Kelly's lifestyle and personality. 10 November 1888.

In 2005, author Tony Williams claimed that Kelly had been found on the 1881 census return for Brymbo, near Wrexham, Wales. This claim was made on the basis that living next door to the Kelly family was a bachelor named Jonathan Davies, who could have been the "Davies" or "Davis" whom Joseph Barnett claimed had married Kelly when she was approximately 16 years old. This claim is almost certainly wrong because if Kelly's husband was indeed killed two or three years later, this Jonathan Davies could not have been him, as the 1891 census return indicates this individual was still alive and residing in Brymbo. In any case, hardly any of the details given by Barnett matched those of the family residing in Brymbo in 1881. Brymbo is in Denbighshire, not Carmarthen or Caernarfon, and the father's name was Hubert Kelly, not John. Allegations that the diaries of Sir John Williams, on which Williams based his research and whom he claims was the Ripper, were altered casts further doubt upon this author's theories. In 2015, author Wynne Weston-Davies advanced the theory that Kelly's real identity was his own great aunt Elizabeth Davies, born in 1857 as the daughter of a Welsh quarryman.

== Funeral ==
Kelly was buried at 2 pm on Monday 19 November 1888. She was laid to rest in St Patrick's Roman Catholic Cemetery in Leytonstone in a service officiated by the Reverend Father Columban.

No family members could be located to attend her funeral, and both Joseph Barnett and her landlord, John McCarthy, were insistent her remains were interred in accordance with the rituals of her Church. The eight individuals in the two mourning coaches following Kelly's polished elm and oak coffin from Shoreditch Church to the cemetery were Joseph Barnett, a representative of John McCarthy, and six women who had known Kelly and who had testified at the inquest: Mary Ann Cox, Elizabeth Prater, Caroline Maxwell, Sarah Lewis, Julia Venturney, and Maria Harvey. Several thousand people gathered outside Shoreditch Church to observe the funeral procession. Kelly's obituary ran as follows:

The funeral of the murdered woman Kelly has once more been postponed. Deceased was a Catholic, and the man Barnett, with whom she lived, and her landlord, Mr. M. Carthy, desired to see her remains interred with the ritual of her Church. The funeral will, therefore, take place tomorrow [19 Nov] in the Roman Catholic Cemetery at Leytonstone. The hearse will leave the Shoreditch mortuary at half-past twelve.
The remains of Mary Janet [sic] Kelly, who was murdered on 9 Nov in Miller's-court, Dorset-street, Spitalfields, were brought yesterday morning from Shoreditch mortuary to the cemetery at Leytonstone, where they were interred.
No family member could be found to attend the funeral.

The inscription on Kelly's grave marker reads: "In loving memory of Marie Jeanette Kelly. None but the lonely hearts can know my sadness. Love lives forever."

== Media ==
=== Film ===
- A Study in Terror (1965). This film casts Edina Ronay as Mary Jane Kelly.
- Murder by Decree (1979). Directed by Bob Clark. This British-Canadian mystery thriller film casts Susan Clark as Mary Kelly.
- Love Lies Bleeding (1999). A drama film directed by William Tannen. Kelly is portrayed by Andrea Miltner.
- From Hell (2001). Directed by the Hughes Brothers, the film casts Heather Graham as Mary Kelly.

=== Television ===
- Jack the Ripper (1988). A Thames Television film drama series starring Michael Caine. Mary Kelly is played by Lysette Anthony.
- The Real Jack the Ripper (2010). Directed by David Mortin, this series casts Yulia Petrauskas as Mary Kelly and was first broadcast on 31 August 2010.
- Jack the Ripper: The Definitive Story (2011). A two-hour documentary which references original police reports and eyewitness accounts pertaining to the Whitechapel Murderer. Kelly is portrayed by Lexie Lambert.

=== Drama ===
- Jack, the Last Victim (2005). This musical casts Amanda Almond as Mary Kelly.

== See also ==
- Cold case
- List of serial killers before 1900
- Unsolved murders in the United Kingdom
