= George Hutchinson (Jack the Ripper suspect) =

Jack the Ripper witness and suspect

George Hutchinson was an English worker who made a formal statement to police after the murder of Mary Jane Kelly on 9 November 1888. Kelly had been the last of the "Canonical Five" connected to the Whitechapel Murders in London. The statement survives in its entirety and in it, he provided an exhaustive description of a man who could have been Kelly's killer, known as Jack the Ripper. Modern crime writers have since questioned the veracity of Hutchinson's testimony, which has been characterised as antisemitic and suspiciously detailed, especially when considering that the scene supposedly took place in an unlit street at night. Hutchinson has been variously deemed an inaccurate or even false witness, with some true crime authors regarding him as a possible Jack the Ripper suspect.

== Background ==
Hutchinson was described as an unemployed labourer and former groom who lived in Victoria Home for Working Men on Commercial Street. Newspapers at the time have variously given his age as between 22 and 33 years and sometimes state that Hutchinson served in the British Army in some capacity.

== Hutchinson's statement ==
On 12 November 1888, three days after Mary Jane Kelly's murder at Miller's Court, 26 Dorset Street in London's East End, Hutchinson made a statement at the Commercial Street police station. The statement was recorded by Sergeant Edward Badham.

Hutchinson claimed to have sighted the victim hours before her death, in the company of a client who was too elegant for the poor area of Whitechapel. Hutchinson said that at about 2 o'clock in the morning of 9 November 1888, he was walking on Commercial Street to his home, and just before he reached Flower and Dean Street, he saw the soon-to-be victim. He said she greeted him by name and asked for a loan of sixpence. Hutchinson replied that he couldn't help, as he had spent all of his money. She told him that she had to find some money and proceeded to head toward Thrawl Street.

Almost immediately, a man coming from the opposite direction to Mary tapped her shoulder and whispered something in her ear; possibly a joke, since they both laughed. Hutchinson said that he then heard the man say: "You will be alright for what I have told you." The man then put his right arm on the woman's shoulders and they both hugged.

Hutchinson's statement said that the man was carrying "a kind of a small parcel in his left hand with a kind of strap round it".

Hutchinson said he paid much attention to Mary's companion, because he was surprised by his foreign appearance – "Jewish appearance", he ventured – as well as the elegance with which he dressed, an extraordinary thing in that very deprived area. The witness decided to go under the gas lamp that illuminated the entrance of the Queen's Head tavern, in order to take advantage of the better lighting and take a closer look.

As the couple passed in front of him, Kelly's client – noticing that he was being observed – scrutinized the witness with a sullen attitude and immediately lowered his head. As he lowered the hat over his eyes, his identification became difficult.

The curious witness narrated that – by that elusive gesture – he bent down to see the individual's face well. The duo headed for Dorset Street, closely followed by Hutchinson, who saw them chat for three minutes before they entered Miller's Court, where Mary had her room.

Then the companion whispered something, to which the young woman responded: "Come, I will make you feel comfortable, dear." After that, he hugged and kissed her. Before entering, Mary stopped and told him that she had lost her handkerchief, whereupon the man took out a red handkerchief and gave it to her.

Finally, both entered the inner courtyard of the building, and Hutchinson could no longer continue spying, choosing to wait outside for three quarters of an hour for them to leave. As neither came out during that period, Hutchinson left.

Hutchinson gave a description of Kelly's client:

[Age] about 34 or 35. Height 5ft 6, complexion pale, dark eyes and eye lashes slight moustache, curled up each end, and hair dark, very surley [sic] looking dress long dark coat, collar and cuffs trimmed astrakhan [sic]. And a dark jacket under. Light waistcoat dark trousers [and a] dark felt hat turned down in the middle. Button boots and gaiters with white buttons. Wore a very thick gold chain white linen collar. Black tie with horse shoe pin. Respectable appearance walked very sharp. Jewish appearance. Can be identified.

In his time, nobody was suspicious of Hutchinson. His presence at Miller's Court was separately substantiated by a woman named Sarah Lewis, who saw him loitering around the building Kelly stayed. The principal investigator of the case, Inspector Frederick Abberline, interrogated him in person, and days later told a newspaper that he estimated that Hutchinson's deposition was truthful, and that he seemed sincere. Apparently, Abberline took the testifier's version to heart, who claimed to have known Mary Jane Kelly for three years, and was friends with her.

Hutchinson also testified before the press that the day after the murder, he went out searching for the man and actually saw him. He said that he began following him with the intention of hunting him down, but the stranger noted his presence, hurried his pace and slipped through the streets of Spitalfields. After that, Hutchinson never saw the man again.

== Jack the Ripper suspect ==
Critics of this criminal case ponder whether Hutchinson was a false witness who exaggerated what little he could have known, as it was imbued with a media eagerness and the desire to gain notoriety.

Alan Moore pointed out: "There is something unconvincing in the large amount of details he provides, and I tend to suspect that much of them were invented after the event, a man eager to become the center of attention". Not only did Hutchinson provide a disconcertingly specific amount of detail, he also claimed to have waited outside Kelly's residence for approximately 45 minutes, at 2am in November, when it would have been extremely cold and likely prohibitively unpleasant to do so.

Other authors were even more severe with this problematic witness, and they glimpsed that under his exaggerated statements, a much more sordid intention was hidden than a mere desire for notoriety. In recent times, Hutchinson became suspected of being Jack the Ripper himself. The theory has been promoted by author Robert "Bob" Hinton, who, in his book "From Hell: The Jack the Ripper Mystery", published in 1998, nominated Hutchinson as Mary Jane Kelly's killer and, eventually, the notorious serial killer.

The extensive statements made by him to the authorities are seen as a smokescreen, intended to hide his guilt. The truth could have been that, hopelessly in love with Kelly, he might have done it in a fit of anger and spite, after being despised by her. The killer feared the neighbours would identify him. For example, Sarah Lewis, who was visiting acquaintances at Miller's Court, said she saw a man hovering strangely at the entrance of Miller's Court at dawn of 9 November. That individual was possibly Hutchinson, who knew that testimonies were dangerous, as they would surely come. His deposition, filed three days after Kelly's murder – giving him time to think what to do – had the purpose of avoiding being considered a suspect in the murder if he was identified. That way, he made an alibi with which he justified his presence at the crime scene.

The theory was further developed by Stephen Senise in his book "Jewbaiter Jack the Ripper: New evidence & theory" (subsequently republished in 2018 as "Jack the Ripper False Flag") which places Hutchinson's behavior in the context of anti-semitic attitudes in the East End at the time, and traces the departure of a George Hutchinson from Tilbury to a penal colony in Australia following his conviction for child molestation on the RMS Ormuz a few weeks after the murder of Alice McKenzie in July 1889.

In the 1991 book "The Ripper And The Royals", which accuses Prince Albert Victor, Duke of Clarence and Avondale of being Jack the Ripper, author Melvyn Fairclough interviews then-74-year old Reginald Hutchinson, who alleges that his father, George William Topping Hutchinson (1 October 1866 – 1938), was the same George Hutchinson who made the Jack the Ripper statement in 1888, at the age of 22. Reginald Hutchinson remembers that his father implicated Lord Randolph Churchill in having covered up the Whitechapel murders for, as well as that he had been paid 100 shillings by Churchill as hush money. Since contemporary records prove that Prince Albert Victor was not in London at the time of the killings, the theory and Reginald's claims have been dismissed as false by researchers.

== See also ==
- Jack the Ripper suspects
- Jack the Ripper in fiction
