= Ewing Annex Hotel =

Cage hotel in Chicago

Coordinates: 41.8762°N 87.6311°W

The Ewing Annex Hotel in Chicago is one of the last single-room occupancy cage hotels in the United States. As of 2021, it housed some 200 men, many of whom would otherwise be homeless. Its licence requires it to admit male customers only.

It is on the 400 block of South Clark Street, a run-down area of Chicago. In 2013, an attempt was made by city aldermen to shut the Ewing down. They were quoted as saying "average Chicagoans wouldn’t want to house their dogs in this type of facility".

As of 2017, the Ewing Annex Hotel and the Wilson Men's Hotel were the last two "cage hotels" in the city. As of 2021, only the Ewing remained.
