= Joe Balyeat =

American politician

Member of the Montana Senate from the 34th district
- In office 2004 – June 2012
- Succeeded by: Scott Sales

Member of the Montana House of Representatives from the 32nd district
- In office 2000–2004
- Preceded by: Joe Barnett

Personal details
- Born: October 26, 1956 Great Falls, Montana, U.S.
- Died: October 4, 2022 (aged 65) Bozeman, Montana, U.S.
- Party: Republican
- Spouse: Linda Lee
- Education: University of Montana
- Occupation: CPA

Joe Balyeat (October 26, 1956 – October 4, 2022) was an American politician from the state of Montana. He served as a member of the Montana Legislature. Balyeat was elected as a Republican to Senate District 34, representing Bozeman, Montana, in 2004. Previously, Balyeat served two terms in the Montana House.

Balyeat resigned his Senate Seat in June 2012 to take on the Montana State Director role with Americans for Prosperity. He would have been ineligible to run for re-election due to Montana's term limits.

Balyeat was found dead from natural causes in Truman Gulch on October 5, 2022. Balyeat had been hunting and did not return when expected.
