= Flophouse =

Place with cheap lodging

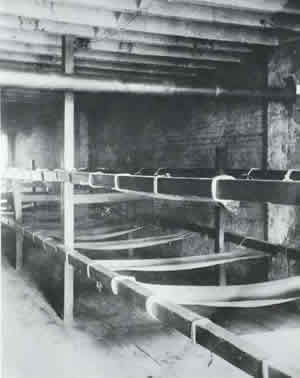
Bunks in a Seven Cent Lodging House, c. 1890

A flophouse (American English) or doss-house (British English) is a place that has very low-cost lodging, providing space to sleep and minimal amenities.

== Characteristics ==
Historically, flophouses, or British "doss-houses", have been used for overnight lodging by those who needed the lowest-cost alternative to staying with others, shelters, or sleeping outside. Generally, rooms are small, bathrooms are shared, and bedding is minimal, sometimes with mattresses or mats on the floor, or canvas sheets stretched between two horizontal beams creating a series of hammock-like beds.

People who make use of these places have often been called transients and have been between homes. Quarters are typically very small, and may resemble office cubicles more than a regular room in a hotel or an apartment building. Some flophouses qualify as boarding houses, but only if they offer meals.

American flophouses date at least to the 19th century, but the term flophouse itself is only attested from around the early 1900s, originating in hobo slang. In the past, flophouses were sometimes called lodging houses or workingmen's hotels and catered to hobos and transient workers such as seasonal railroad and agriculture workers, or migrant lumberjacks who would travel west during the summer to work and then return to an eastern or midwestern city which ran along the rail lines, such as Chicago, to stay in a flophouse during the winter. This is described in the 1930 novel The Rambling Kid by Charles Ashleigh and the 1976 book The Human Cougar by Lloyd Morain. Another theme in Morain's book is the gentrification which was then beginning and which has led cities to pressure flophouses to close.

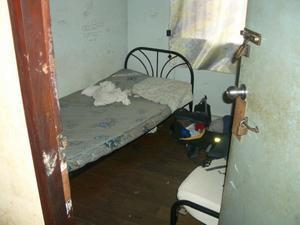
A flophouse-style room

Some city districts with flophouses in abundance became well known in their own right, such as the Bowery in Manhattan, New York City. Since the middle 20th century, reforms there have gradually made flophouses scarcer. The resulting gentrification and higher real-estate value have further eroded the ability of flophouses and inexpensive boarding-style hotels to make a profit.

== 21st-century revival ==
In the 2010s, the high cost of housing in cities such as San Francisco saw an increase in the number of flophouses. The modern flophouses, sometimes marketed as co-living "pods", usually have partitions between beds for privacy, and are created from existing houses or apartments. They are often marketed toward commuters who stay in the city during the workweek.

== Cage homes in Hong Kong ==
Cage homes were built in colonial Hong Kong in the 1950s for single working men from mainland China. Cage homes are described as "wire mesh cages resembling rabbit hutches crammed into a dilapidated apartment." As of 2012, the number of impoverished residents in Hong Kong was estimated at 1.19 million, and cage homes, along with substandard housing such as cubicle apartments, were still serving a portion of this sector's housing needs. The combination of high rents and income inequality has been given as one reason that cage homes persist.

Michael Adorjan, a University of Hong Kong criminology professor, has noted, that "The United Nations has called cage and cubicle homes an 'insult to human dignity.'"

== Cage hotels in the United States ==
Cage hotels, a form of single-room occupancy, were common in Chicago at the turn of the 20th century; an estimated 40,000 to 60,000 people lived in them during the winter.

These were lofts or other large, open buildings that were subdivided into tiny cubicles using boards or sheets of corrugated iron. Since these walls were always one to three feet short of the floor or ceiling, the open space was sealed off with chicken wire, hence the name "cage hotels."

A 1958 survey by Christopher Jencks found that homeless men preferred cage hotels over shelters for reasons of privacy and security.

A similar preference for cage hotels over shelters was reported in turn of the century New York City, where single working men ranked their housing preference in the following order:

They preferred lodging and boarding houses to cages, cages to dormitories, dormitories to flops, and flops to the city's shelters. Men could act on these preferences by moving as their incomes increased.

"Regulatory efforts to combat low-cost 'cage hotels,' ... [has been] a driver of the expansion of the homeless population in US cities", according to Jencks. By 2021, only one, the Ewing Annex Hotel, remained in Chicago, housing some 200 men, many of whom would otherwise be homeless.

== See also ==
- Capsule hotel
- Bedspace apartment
- Common lodging-house
- Hostel
- Internet café
- Punk house
- Staying Alive
