= George Hutchison =

George Hutchison may refer to:

- George Hutchison (New Zealand politician) (1846–1930), New Zealand politician from Taranaki
- George Hutchison (mayor) (1882–1947), Mayor of Auckland, New Zealand from 1931 to 1935
- George Hutchison (British politician) (1873–1928), Scottish Unionist Party Member of Parliament (MP) for Midlothian and Peebles Northern
- George Hutchison (moderator) (1818–1894), Scottish minister
- Ian Clark Hutchison (1903–2002), full name George Ian Clark Hutchison, Scottish Unionist Party MP for Edinburgh West

== See also ==
- George Hutchinson (disambiguation)
