= Joe Barnett =

American politician (1929–2025)

Member of the Montana House of Representatives from the 76th (1991–1995) and 32nd (1995–2001) district
- In office 1991–2001
- Preceded by: Vernon Westlake
- Succeeded by: Joe Balyeat

Personal details
- Born: August 4, 1929 Gallatin County, Montana, U.S.
- Died: January 5, 2025 (aged 95) Belgrade, Montana, U.S.
- Party: Republican
- Spouse: Janelle Stiff (m. 1949; died 2021)
- Children: 3
- Parents: Joseph William Barnett (father); Francis Kelly (mother)

Joseph William Barnett Jr. (August 4, 1929 – January 5, 2025) was an American politician from the state of Montana. He served as a Republican member of the Montana House of Representatives from 1991 to 2001.

== Life and career ==
Barnett was born in the Horseshoe Hills, north of Manhattan, Montana. He was the son of Joseph William and Francis (née Kelly) Barnett, and he was orphaned by the age of eight. He was raised in Manhattan, and attended Montana State College, earning a bachelor's degree in physical education. He married Janelle Stitt in 1949, and they remained married until her death in 2021. He served in the U.S. Air Force, then was hired by Bozeman High School in 1956 as a history teacher and coach, earned a master's degree in administration from Montana State, and taught until 1984. In 1963, he and his wife purchased a beekeeping business, which would grow into his fulltime profession.

In 1990, Barnett ran for the Montana House of Representatives, narrowly defeating incumbent Democrat Vernon Westlake. He was re-elected with ease four times, then in 2000, he was term-limited and decided to run for a seat in the Montana Senate. He lost that election to fellow state representative Emily Swanson. He died at his home in Belgrade, Montana, on January 5, 2025, at the age of 95.

== Electoral history ==
=== 1990 ===
==== Primary election ====
Montana House of Representatives, District 76, 1990 primary election * denotes incumbent Source:
| Party | Candidate | Votes | % |
|---|---|---|---|
| Republican | Joe Barnett | 1,192 | 100 |
| Total votes | | 1,192 | 100 |

==== General election ====
Montana House of Representatives, District 76, 1990 general election * denotes incumbent Source:
| Party | Candidate | Votes | % |
|---|---|---|---|
| Republican | Joe Barnett | 1,933 | 52.2 |
| Democratic | Vernon Westlake * | 1,771 | 47.8 |
| Total votes | | 3,704 | 100 |

=== 1992 ===
==== Primary election ====
Montana House of Representatives, District 76, 1992 primary election * denotes incumbent Source:
| Party | Candidate | Votes | % |
|---|---|---|---|
| Republican | Joe Barnett * | 1,288 | 100 |
| Total votes | | 1,288 | 100 |

==== General election ====
Montana House of Representatives, District 76, 1992 general election * denotes incumbent Source:
| Party | Candidate | Votes | % |
|---|---|---|---|
| Republican | Joe Barnett * | 3,656 | 73.8 |
| Democratic | Sean R. Knight | 1,298 | 26.2 |
| Total votes | | 4,954 | 100 |

=== 1994 ===
==== Primary election ====
Montana House of Representatives, District 32, 1994 primary election * denotes incumbent Source:
| Party | Candidate | Votes | % |
|---|---|---|---|
| Republican | Joe Barnett * | 1,096 | 100 |
| Total votes | | 1,096 | 100 |

==== General election ====
Montana House of Representatives, District 32, 1994 general election * denotes incumbent Source:
| Party | Candidate | Votes | % |
|---|---|---|---|
| Republican | Joe Barnett * | 2,923 | 75.7 |
| Democratic | Lorene L. Blakely | 939 | 24.3 |
| Total votes | | 3,862 | 100 |

=== 1996 ===
==== Primary election ====
Montana House of Representatives, District 32, 1996 primary election * denotes incumbent Source:
| Party | Candidate | Votes | % |
|---|---|---|---|
| Republican | Joe Barnett * | 1,358 | 100 |
| Total votes | | 1,358 | 100 |

==== General election ====
Montana House of Representatives, District 32, 1996 general election * denotes incumbent Source:
| Party | Candidate | Votes | % |
|---|---|---|---|
| Republican | Joe Barnett * | 3,889 | 81.6 |
| Democratic | Bob Roughton | 875 | 18.4 |
| Total votes | | 4,764 | 100 |

=== 1998 ===
==== Primary election ====
Montana House of Representatives, District 32, 1998 primary election * denotes incumbent Source:
| Party | Candidate | Votes | % |
|---|---|---|---|
| Republican | Joe Barnett * | 749 | 100 |
| Total votes | | 749 | 100 |

==== General election ====
Montana House of Representatives, District 32, 1998 general election * denotes incumbent Source:
| Party | Candidate | Votes | % |
|---|---|---|---|
| Republican | Joe Barnett * | 3,434 | 100 |
| Total votes | | 3,434 | 100 |

=== 2000 ===
==== Primary election ====
Montana Senate, District 15, 2000 primary election * denotes incumbent Source:
| Party | Candidate | Votes | % |
|---|---|---|---|
| Republican | Joe Barnett | 703 | 100 |
| Total votes | | 703 | 100 |

==== General election ====
Montana Senate, District 15, 2000 general election * denotes incumbent Source:
| Party | Candidate | Votes | % |
|---|---|---|---|
| Democratic | Emily Swanson | 3,853 | 59.5 |
| Republican | Joe Barnett | 2,618 | 40.5 |
| Total votes | | 6,471 | 100 |
