= Joseph Barnett (Jack the Ripper suspect) =

English murder suspect

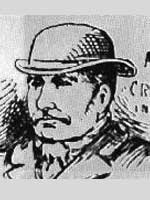
- Sketch of Barnett
- Born: 25 May 1858; Whitechapel, London, England
- Died: 29 November 1926 (aged 68); Stepney, England
- Occupations: Fish porter, construction worker
- Spouse: Louisa Barnett

Joseph Barnett (25 May 1858 – 29 November 1926), also known by his nicknames Danny Barnett and Joe, was a fish porter who worked at Billingsgate Market in the 19th century, located in the East End of London, and later became known for being the roommate of Mary Jane Kelly. It was not suspected that he had murdered her and, even less, that he was Jack the Ripper, until the 1970s, when he was added to the growing list of more than 100 people that someone has speculated could be Jack the Ripper.

== Biography ==
Joseph Barnett was born on 25 May 1858 at 4 Hairbrain Court, Whitechapel. He was the fourth child of dock worker John Barnett and his wife, Catherine, Irish immigrants who fled their native country for Great Britain following the Great Famine. The Barnetts already had a son before they moved to Whitechapel, Denis, and went on to have three other children (excluding Joseph) - Daniel (b. 1851), Catherine (b. 1853) and John (b. 1860).

In 1861, the family moved to nearby Cartwright Street, and they lived there until 1864, when the elder Barnett, who worked as a porter in Billingsgate Fish Market, died of pleurisy in July. His eldest son Denis assumed responsibility as head of the family, until he married Mary Ann Garrett and moved to Bermondsey, on the other side of the river Thames.

Before he turned 20, Barnett began working in Billingsgate Market as a fish porter, a job he held for more than a decade, although intermittently, until he was sacked in October 1888, when he was 30 years old and living with an Irish woman, Mary Jane Kelly. Barnett also worked briefly as a horse slaughterer in the Kings Cross area for a short period.

Little is known about Barnett's life after Kelly's death. He only reappeared in official records in 1906, when he was again granted a porter's licence at Billingsgate Market. At that time he lived at 18 New Gravel Lane, Shadwell, with his brother Daniel. The following year his work licence shows that he lived at Number 60 Red Lion Street, Shadwell, and in 1908 at Tench Street, Wapping.

After this, in 1919 the electoral register recorded that he lived at 106 Red Lion Street in Shadwell with Louisa Barnett, who appears to be his wife, although there is no documented evidence to confirm whether he was married or had any children with her. The couple remained there until Louisa's death on 3 November 1926. Shortly thereafter, it is recorded that Joseph Barnett died on 29 November 1926, at the age of 68. The cause of death was oedema of the lungs and acute bronchitis.

== Relationship with Mary Jane Kelly ==
Joseph Barnett was Mary Jane Kelly's roommate until days before she was brutally murdered on Friday 9 November 1888. He was 30 years old in 1888 and had worked as a fish porter at the Billingsgate Fish Market in London's East End, though he had reportedly been fired earlier in the year, which may have been why Kelly had resorted to prostitution. He occasionally also worked as a construction worker. The pair had rented the small room of 13 Miller's Court at 26 Dorset Street, Spitalfields.

On 30 October that year, he had separated from Kelly after a violent fight, potentially due to his disapproval of the people whom she associated with as a prostitute. During the fight blunt objects had been thrown, resulting in the glass of the window adjacent to the door that entered the house being broken.

Barnett later testified that despite the separation, they saw each other again outside Miller's Court several times after he had moved out, though only as friends. Both he and Kelly adopted, from then on, the custom of introducing the arm through the broken window in order to open the porch from the inside, pushing the inner bolt, since they had lost the only key and had no money to manufacture a copy. Barnett also stated that on the night of 8 November, the evening of Kelly's murder, he had visited her for around one hour.

That version seemed incongruous and aroused distrust among the investigators. If Barnett had stopped living with Kelly, his claim that they both opened the keyless door by using the procedure he described was not understood. However, Barnett explained that, despite their confrontation, they remained on cordial terms, to the point that when he got a new job, he offered financial assistance to Kelly. Some witnesses apparently confirmed Barnett's claims, having seen the couple drinking in a tavern in the company of Julia Venturney, another resident of Miller's Court.

In the subsequent judicial survey conducted after the murder of Mary Jane Kelly, he was called to the stand as a witness. Once there, he said he could recognise Kelly, despite the dire state of the body, by the shape of her eyes and ears. After that statement, Barnett supplied to the justice most of the little information known about Kelly's life.

== Connection to Jack the Ripper ==
Even though contemporary investigators did not suspect this individual to be guilty of murder, in more recent times he has been accused of being the sordid killer by more than one scholar. Suspicion initially fell on Joseph Barnett in 1972 when, in an article in True Crime magazine, American former private investigator Bruce Paley suggested he was Jack the Ripper.

Years later, in a book published in 1995 with the title "Jack the Ripper: The Simple Truth", the same author revived the theory by adding new speculation to endorse the candidacy of the fish porter from Billingsgate Fish Market.

Essentially, he proclaimed Barnett passionately loved Mary Jane Kelly - although many say that they weren't even in a relationship, just roommates - and that Barnett was secretly in love with her. Once, Barnett even called Kelly "wife", even though they were not married. Barnett was desperate to get Kelly away from prostitution and alcoholism. In order to frighten her so that she would abandon her dissolute lifestyle and permanently settle down with him, he devoted himself to brutally decimating her colleagues.

Barnett also used to read the press reports to his "partner", and she frequently asked him if police had captured the perpetrator. The plan seemed successful, as the frightened young woman stopped walking the streets for a while. But at the end of October, Mary went on to share her room with another prostitute named Maria Harvey, with whom Paley suggested Kelly had a lesbian relationship. This situation stoked the ire of Barnett, who decided to leave her after a fiery fight on 30 October 1888.

According to this theory, after some frustrated attempts at reconciliation, Barnett arrived unexpectedly on the night of 9 November at his former lover's room. Soon after, the final argument began. Forced to accept a definitive rejection by Kelly, and taken over by uncontrollable jealousy and rage, he proceeded to kill her as well.

A number of arguments have been highlighted in support of the hypothesis blaming Joseph Barnett for the murders, namely:

1) He would have kept the key to the room he shared with Kelly and, after completing the homicide, went out and locked the door using that key, which had not been lost, as he falsely claimed.

2) His physiognomy resembled the person who was described accompanying some victims before their murders; above all, age and height match.

3) He lived in the centre of the Whitechapel district in 1888, when the crimes occurred.

4) He had most likely met the other murdered women, who would have let their guard down in his presence, a circumstance that explains why they did not defend themselves when attacked.

5) It was learned, and he admitted it himself to the authorities, that days before the murder, he had quarrelled with Mary Jane Kelly.

6) It was speculated that Catherine Eddowes suspected he was the killer, as she told one pensioner. Her murder could have been committed to eliminate a dangerous witness.

7) He was of Irish origin, so could have written the "From Hell" letter addressed to George Lusk, which contained idioms from that country.

8) As a fish porter, he filleted fish and possessed an appropriate weapon that matched the knife with which the killer inflicted the cuts to his numerous victims.

9) On 30 September 1888, the night of the "double event", the escape route taken by the murderer led to Barnett's home. He could even have washed his bloody hands in a fountain near Miller's Court, where he lived at the time.

10) A tobacco pipe of his was found at the scene of Mary Jane Kelly's murder. If he had removed all his belongings a few days before and no longer returned to the place, as he had said, how did this object come to be there?

11) He had a reason to perpetrate the excesses of Jack the Ripper. He was not alienated or psychotic, but an intelligent and cunning individual who - precisely because of these characteristics - the police never managed to catch.

== See also ==
- Jack the Ripper suspects
