= George Hutchinson (Australian rules footballer) =

Australian rules footballer

Personal information
- Full name: George Benjamin Hutchinson
- Born: 6 December 1874; Maryborough, Victoria
- Died: 22 May 1946 (aged 71); East Melbourne, Victoria
- Original team: Ballarat

Playing career^{1}
Years	Club	Games (Goals)
1902	Fitzroy	9 (0)
- ^{1} Playing statistics correct to the end of 1902.

George Benjamin Hutchinson (6 December 1874 – 22 May 1946) was an Australian rules footballer who played with Fitzroy in the Victorian Football League (VFL).
