= Flower and Dean Street =

Former road in Spitalfields, London

Coordinates: 51.5179°N 0.0727°W

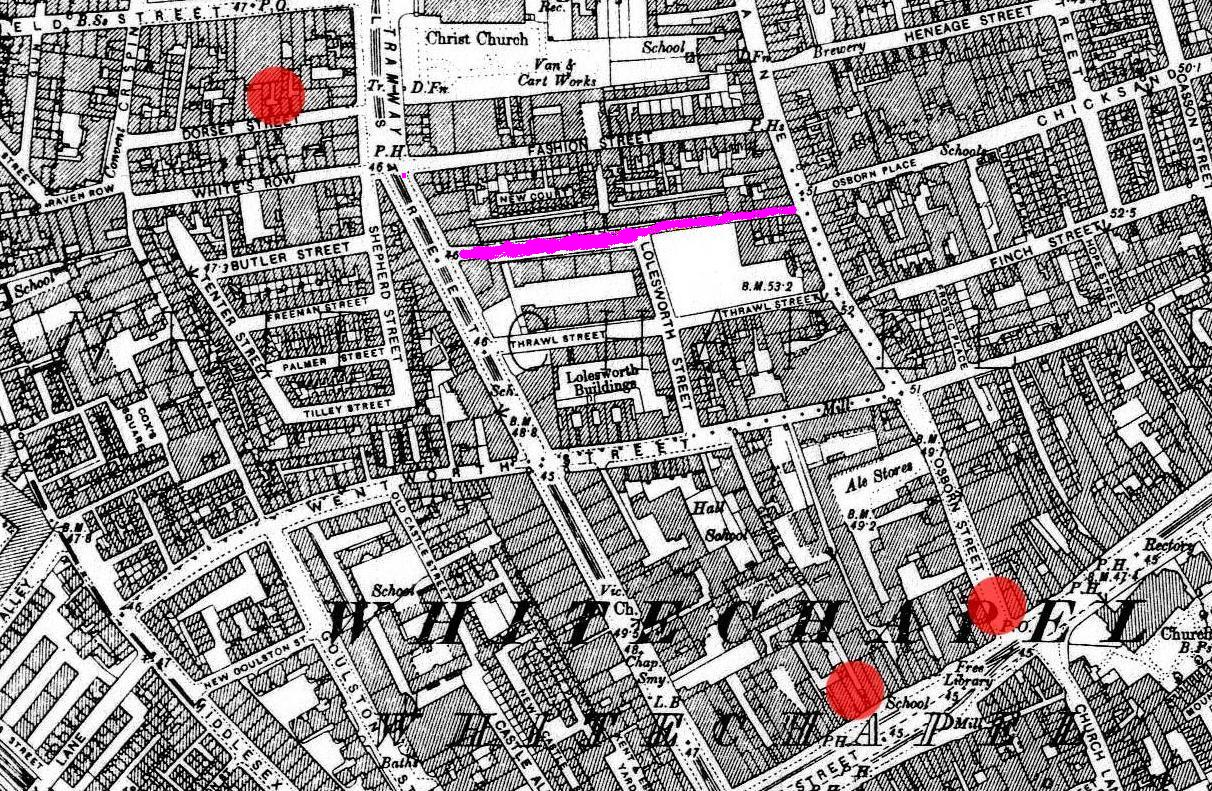
1894 map showing the location of Flower and Dean Street (mauve) and the murder sites of three victims of the Whitechapel murders.

Flower and Dean Street was a road at the heart of the Spitalfields rookery in the East End of London. It was one of the most notorious slums of the Victorian era, being described in 1883 as "perhaps the foulest and most dangerous street in the whole metropolis", and was closely associated with the victims of Jack the Ripper.

Land was acquired by the Fossan brothers in the mid 17th century. At that time it consisted of the southern part of Lolesworth Field, a tenterground to its south and a spinning and twisting ground with gardens to the south of that. The brothers built a street through the field which was named after them, which became Fashion Street. They split the tenterground into two long parcels and employed two bricklayers, John Flower and Gowan Dean, to build houses along its length. By the nineteenth century the back gardens of the original tenements had been built on for narrow courts and alleys and the area had become a slum. The poverty and deprivation of the area was reflected by the greatest concentration of common lodging-houses in London. In 1871 there were 31 such places in the street. They provided accommodation for the desperate and the destitute and were a focus for the activities of local thieves and prostitutes. Already in 1865 the street was referred to by the artist Ford Madox Brown as the epitome of social degradation in his description of his painting Work. Brown describes a vagabond depicted in the picture as living in Flower and Dean Street, "haunt of vice", "where the policemen walk two and two, and the worst cut-throats surround him".

Slum clearance began 1881–83. In 1888, the Whitechapel murders by the serial killer known as Jack the Ripper prompted further redevelopment. Two of those women murdered, Elizabeth Stride and Catherine Eddowes, resided in two common lodging-houses on the street. A study using geographical profiling suggested that the killer probably lived on the street. The scandal of the killings prompted 'respectable' landlords to divest themselves of property here and all traces of the street were virtually eradicated between 1891 and 1894 in a major slum clearance programme. There is now a housing block where the street used to be.

A 2008 Scotland Yard geographical profile of Jack the Ripper concluded that he most probably lived in the street where two of his victims lived.

The Flower and Dean Walk housing estate is directly across Commercial Street from the historic site of the street.
