= Common lodging-house =

Victorian era term for a form of cheap accommodation

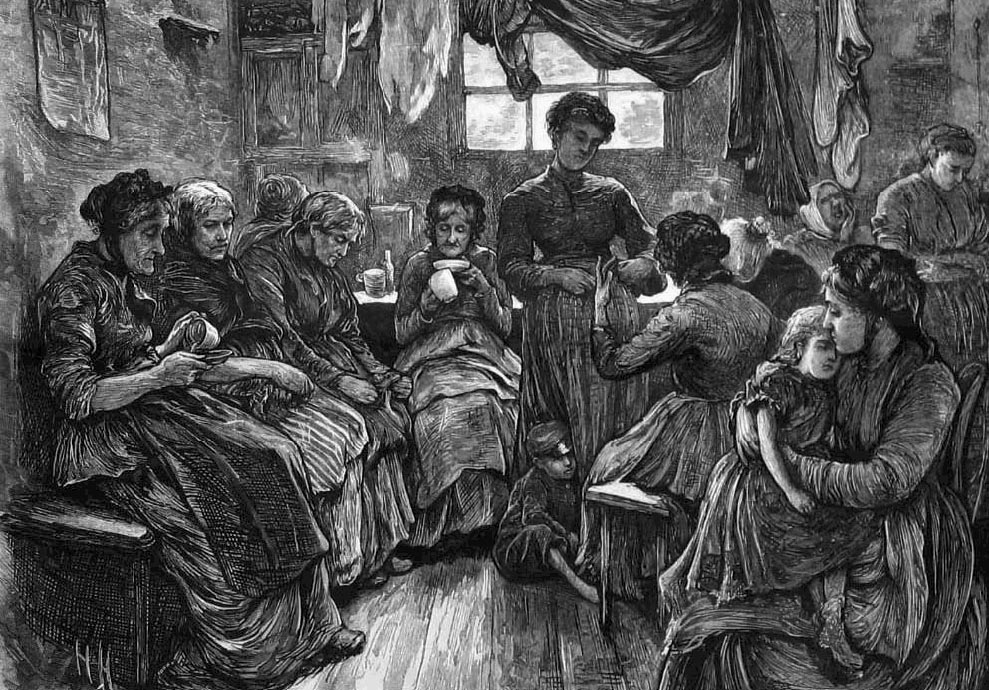
Illustration of Low Lodging House, St Giles, London, 1872

"Common lodging-house" is a Victorian era term for a form of cheap accommodation in which the inhabitants (who are not members of one family) are all lodged together in the same room or rooms, whether for eating or sleeping. The slang terms dosshouse (British English) and flophouse (North American English) designate roughly the equivalent of common lodging-houses. The nearest modern equivalent is a hostel.

== Great Britain ==
There was no statutory definition of the class of houses in England intended to be included in the expression common lodging-house, but the definition used above was adopted to include those houses which, under the Public Health Act 1875 (38 & 39 Vict. c. 55) and other legislation, must be registered and inspected. The provisions of the Public Health Act were that every urban and rural district council must keep registers showing the names and residences of the keepers of all common lodging-houses in their districts, the location of every such house, and the number of lodgers authorized by them.

In his 1845 work The Condition of the Working Class in England, Friedrich Engels described the living conditions of the working poor, including those staying in common lodging houses in industrial cities. According to him, common lodging houses typically offered very basic amenities. Residents were usually provided with a bed in a shared room. There might have been communal facilities such as bathrooms, kitchens, and dining areas, but these were often shared by many residents. Privacy was minimal, with beds or sleeping spaces often in dormitory-style rooms.

The scandalous condition of the common lodging houses in London, which were frequently the resort of criminals and prostitutes, prompted the Common Lodging Houses Acts 1851 and 1853. These regulations, however, proved ineffectual, and the requirement that residents vacate the premises between 10 a.m. and late afternoon hit poor and sick residents hard, as they were obliged to walk the streets in the intervening period in all weathers.

Even tighter control was imposed when regulation of common lodging houses was transferred from the police to the London County Council in 1894, resulting in the imposition of higher standards and regular inspection of the premises by council officials. The new regulations required the landlords to limewash the walls and ceilings twice a year, and mixed-sex accommodation (which was frequently a cover for a brothel) was abolished. Proper beds and bedding had also to be provided instead of mattresses on the floor and worse.

== United States ==
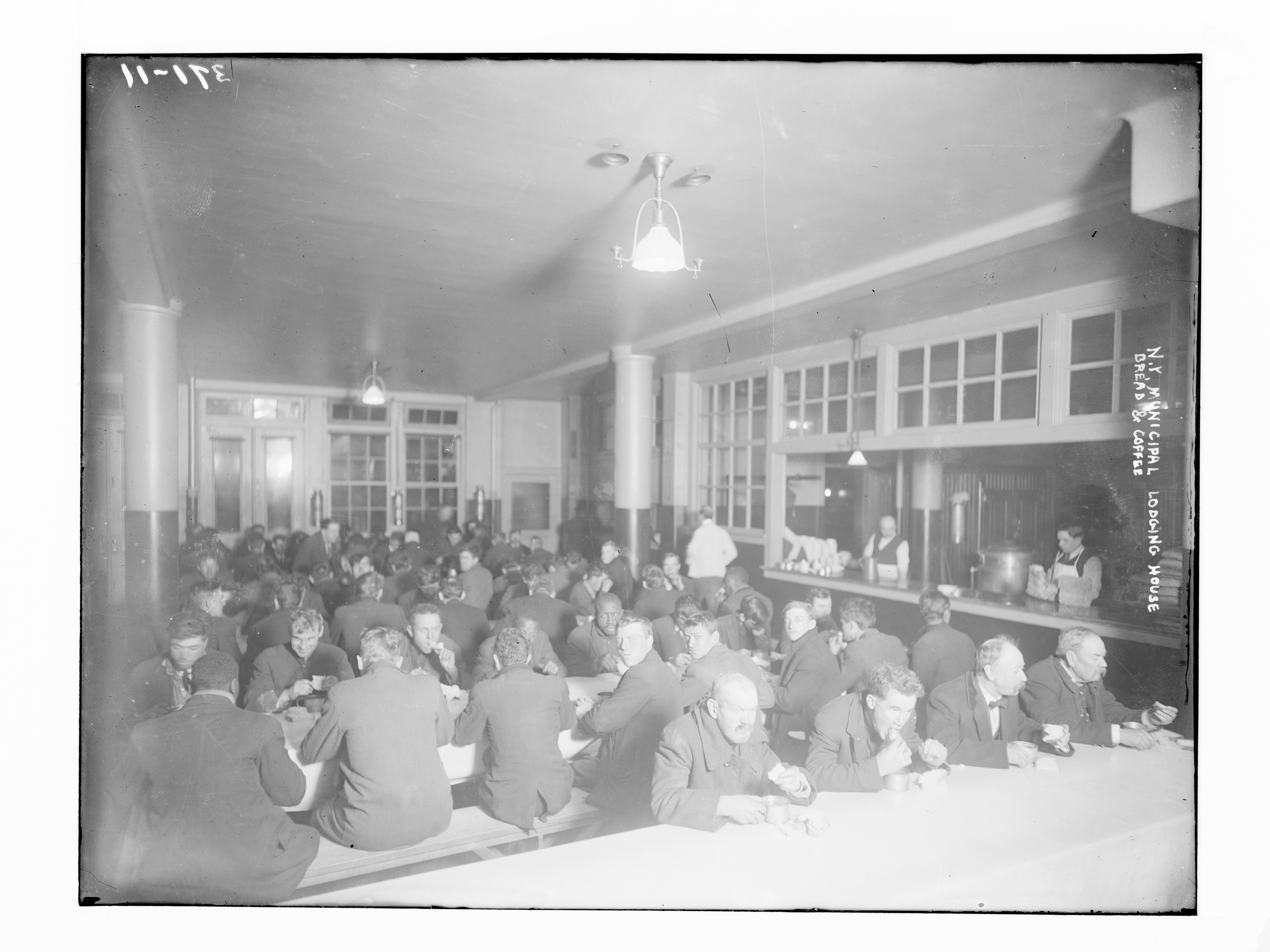
Communal dining area of a Common lodging-house in New York, circa 1910

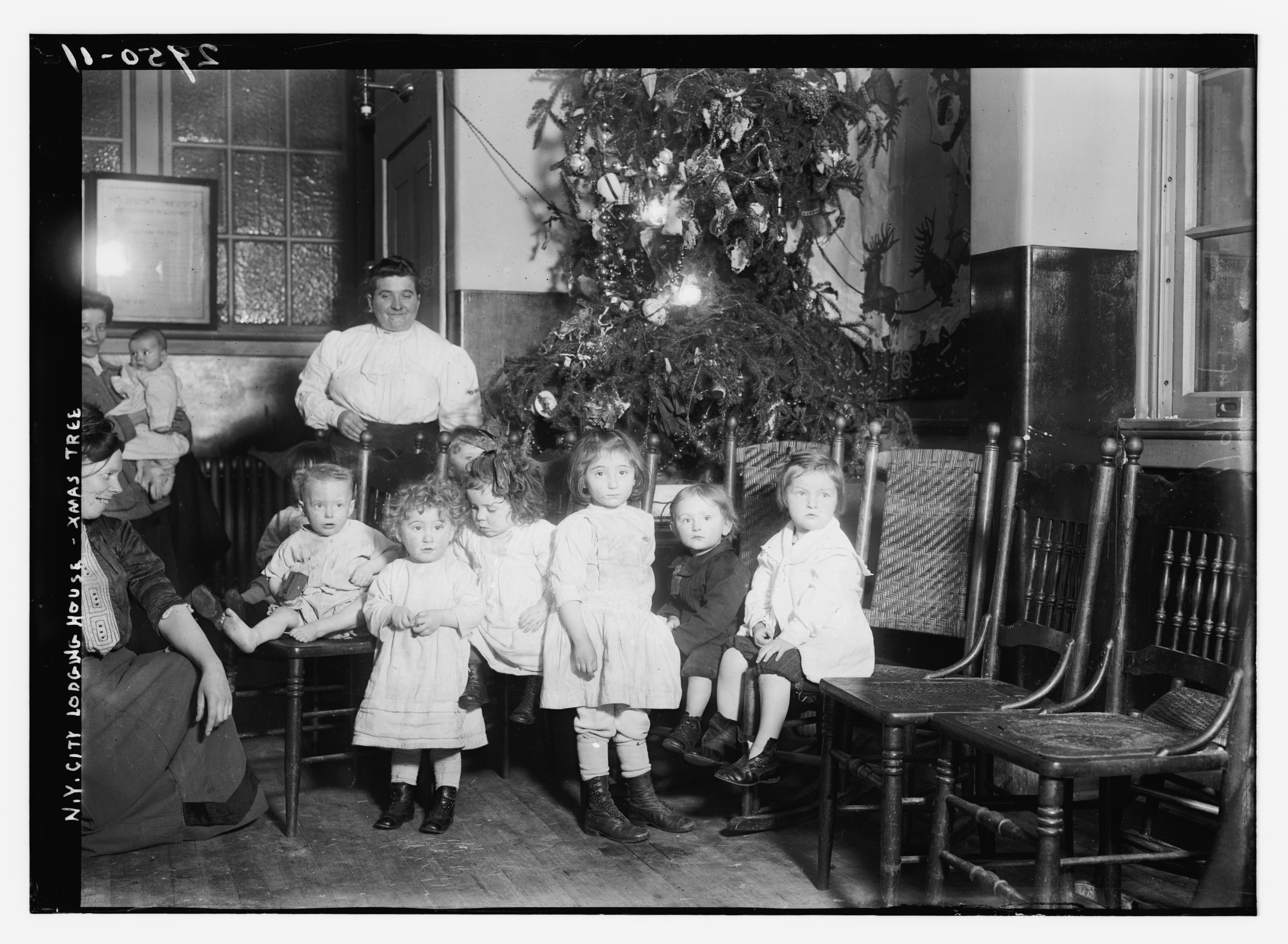
Children within a Common lodging-house, Christmas 1910

Urban reformer Jacob Riis was not only an advocate for improving the condition of people living in cheap lodging houses; he had lived in them as a young man, an experience he described in his slum memoir How the Other Half Lives (1890). Riis states that most lodging house residents were unskilled day laborers whose low wages meant they could not afford other housing. Lodging house residents worked at "menial tasks involved with building industrial plants and street railroads, paving streets, laying pipe and wire for gas and electric systems, and erecting new buildings" and working at "docks, warehouses, and factories". The demand for casual workers fluctuated a great deal from the 1890s to the 1930s; as such, lodging houses provided an inexpensive place for these mobile workers to live. The peak demand for city lodging houses was in the winter, when there was little rural work. To cope with this surge in demand, lodging "house keepers doubled up people in rooms and set more cots out into the hallways." Black workers had difficulties getting housing due to the "color line" restrictions of racial segregation. While most of the lodging house residents were men, some women lived there, often in a separate room.

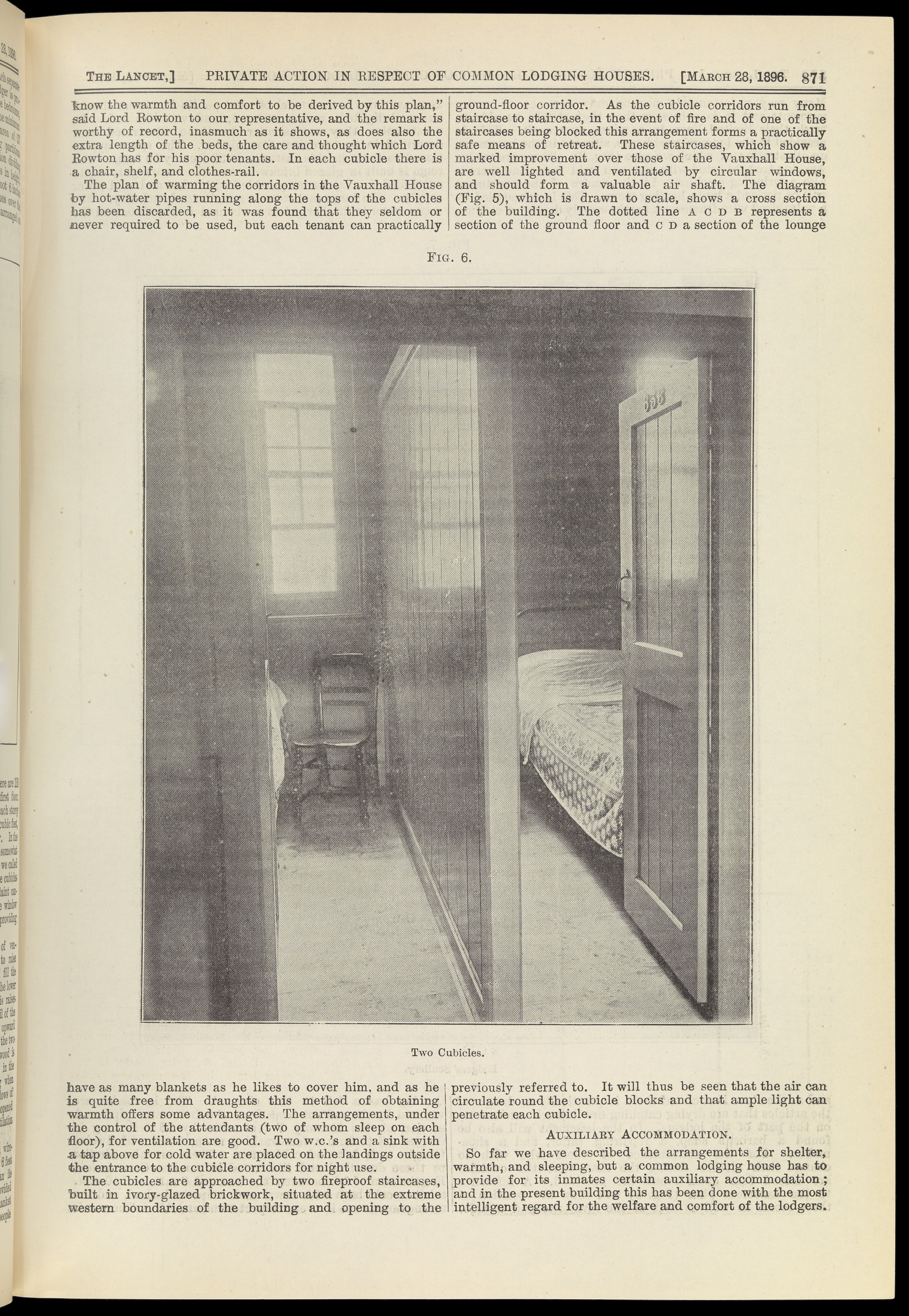
Two cubicles in a common lodging-house

A wide range of lodging house prices were available, depending on how much privacy and common areas they offered, ranging from private rooms, semi-private cubicles (nicknamed "cribs" or "cages"- a reference to the chicken wire that topped the cubicles- they had seven foot walls around a 5 foot by 7 foot space), and the cheapest "flophouse" style lodgings. Most lodging houses had no dining area or restaurant facilities, unless it was in an old hotel. A difference between rooming houses and cheap lodging houses is that rooming houses charged by the week, whereas lodging houses charged for each day, only rarely making weekly tenure available. In major cities, five story or higher rooming houses were common; in smaller cities, three or four stories was the norm. The fairly expensive, 40 cents-per-night lodging house usually had a mattress, chair and clothes hook. The most expensive lodging houses had a little dresser and a basin for water with taps.

A 1913 San Francisco health inspector's report on a 40-cents per night (the top end of the price range) lodging house described it as:

Three-story frame. Saloon on first floor. Thirty-nine rooms [upstairs]. Skylight in hall does not ventilate. Five inside rooms on each floor have window in unventilated hall. One fire escape; one stairway; large hall; four toilets; four baths; twelve stationary basins. Hot water in bath rooms... Many rooms have double beds.

Not all lodging houses were heated, but if heat was available, it would be from hot stoves placed in the hallways. The residents faced "vermin, general filth, and horrific smells", along with "[l]ice, other bedbugs, and mice". The lowest form of lodging house was the flophouse, which typically did not offer beds, providing instead "mattresses or piles of rags with a blanket", hammocks, or simply floor space (with the expectation that renters had their own bedroll). An even lower variant of the flophouse was "unlicensed dives where a lodger could sleep in a corner of a tenement room for 5 cents, or for 3 cents curl up in a sheltered hallway", an approach sometimes used in after-hours theatres.

These rough conditions caused concern amongst reformers and activists, who got City Hall and police stations opened up as emergency lodging, an approach that served only a small percentage of the underhoused population. Another effort was municipal lodging houses, such as the building opened in New York City in 1896. At municipal lodging houses, residents got an iron cot and two light meals if they agreed to "interrogation, fumigation, a shower, a promise of docile behavior, and often at least two hours a day chopping wood or cleaning alleys". Some philanthropists opened hotels for lodging house purposes, such as the 1897 Mills Hotel built by Darius O. Mills. In 1913, the Golden West Hotel was built in San Diego to provide low cost lodging for working men. The Salvation Army opened its first mission in 1890s, soon rising to 44 locations across the US where low cost beds and food were available. While the Salvation Army and similar mission lodging houses were cleaner and offered free or very low cost meals and lodging (often "in return for a sermon or prayer meeting"), they had strict rules on behaviour.
