= Jack the Ripper (disambiguation) =

Jack the Ripper was an unidentified serial killer active in and around Whitechapel, London, England, in 1888.

Jack the Ripper may also refer to:

== Film and television ==
- Jack the Ripper (1959 film), a British film
- Jack the Ripper (1973 TV series), a BBC television drama
- Jack the Ripper (1976 film), a Swiss–German thriller film
- Jack the Ripper (1988 miniseries), a television mini-series

== Literature ==
- Jack the Ripper: The Final Solution, a 1976 book by Stephen Knight
- Jack the Ripper, Light-Hearted Friend, a 1996 book by Richard Wallace
- Jack the Ripper (Black Clover), a character in Black Clover
- Jack the Ripper, a Fate/Apocrypha character
- Jack the Ripper, a Fate/Strange Fake character

== Music ==
- Jack the Ripper (band), a French alternative rock band
- Jack the Ripper (musical), a 1974 musical by Ron Pember
- Jack the Ripper, a 1963 album by Link Wray

=== Songs ===
- "Jack the Ripper" (song), a 1961 song by Clarence Stacy covered by Screaming Lord Sutch in 1963
- "Jack the Ripper", a 1961 song by Link Wray
- "Jack the Ripper", a 1989 song by LL Cool J
- "Jack the Ripper", a 2011 song by The Misfits from The Devil's Rain
- "Jack the Ripper", a 1992 song by Motörhead from March ör Die
- "Jack the Ripper", a 1992 song by Morrissey from the single "Certain People I Know"
- "Jack the Ripper", a 1992 song by Nick Cave and the Bad Seeds from Henry's Dream
- "Jack the Ripper", a 1986 song by Seikima-II

== Video games ==
- Jack the Ripper (1987 video game), a text adventure game by CRL
- Jack the Ripper (2003 video game), an adventure game for Microsoft Windows
- Raiden (Metal Gear) or Jack the Ripper, a character in the Metal Gear games
- Assassin's Creed Syndicate: Jack the Ripper, downloadable content for Assassin's Creed: Syndicate

== Other uses ==
- Casebook: Jack the Ripper, a website started in 1996
- The perpetrator of the New York Ripper murders

== See also ==
- Black the Ripper (born 1987), British rapper
- Whitechapel murders, associated with Jack the Ripper
- From Hell (disambiguation), letter associated with Jack the Ripper and the Whitechapel murders
- Jack the Dripper (disambiguation)
- Ripper (disambiguation)
- Jack (disambiguation)
- John the Ripper, a password cracking tool
