= Richard Wallace =

Richard, Rick, or Dick Wallace may refer to:

- Edgar Wallace (1875–1932), born Richard Wallace, British writer
- Richard Alfred Wallace (1861–1935), Canadian politician and Northwest Territories MLA
- Richard L. Wallace (born 1936), American educator and chancellor of the University of Missouri
- Richard Wallace (cricketer) (1934–2019), Australian cricketer
- Richard Wallace (director) (1894–1951), American film director
- Richard Wallace (fencer) (1872–1941), French Olympic fencer
- Richard Wallace (journalist) (born 1961), British journalist, editor of The Daily Mirror newspaper
- Richard Wallace (rugby league) (born 1944), rugby league footballer of the 1970s for Wales, and York
- Richard Wallace (rugby union) (born 1968), Irish rugby player
- Richard Wallace (scientist) (born 1960), American computer scientist, Chairman of A.L.I.C.E. Artificial Intelligence Foundation
- Rick Wallace (born 1948), American television director
- Sir Richard Wallace, 1st Baronet (1818–1890), English art collector
- Richard Wallace (bishop) (1945–2024), New Zealand Māori Anglican bishop
- Richard Wallace (author), author of Jack the Ripper, Light-Hearted Friend
- Dick Wallace (1882–1925), American baseball player
- Richard Wallace (athlete), Scottish athlete
