= Thomas Bayne =

Thomas Bayne may refer to:

- Thomas Bayne (Sam Nixon) (1824–1888), American politician and former slave
- Thomas M. Bayne (1836–1894), American lawyer, politician and American Civil War Union colonel
- Thomas Vere Bayne (1829–1908), British academic at the University of Oxford
- T. L. Bayne (Thomas Levingston Bayne Jr.), American football player, coach of football and baseball, and attorney
