= Donald McCormick =

George Donald King McCormick (11 December 1911 – 2 January 1998) was a British journalist and popular historian, who also wrote under the pseudonym Richard Deacon.

After working for Naval Intelligence during the Second World War, McCormick was a journalist for the foreign desk of the Sunday Times, at one point working with Ian Fleming. In his prolific output as a historian, McCormick was attracted to controversial topics on which verifiable evidence was scarce. He wrote on the Hellfire Club, Jack the Ripper, the Cambridge Apostles and rather extensively about spies. He wrote histories of the Russian, Chinese, Japanese, British, and Israeli secret services, and biographies of Sir Maurice Oldfield and Ian Fleming.

== Controversial claims ==
McCormick's reliance on an informal network of oral informants, and his eye for a good story, means that it is often difficult to judge the reliability of his more controversial claims. In 1979 he claimed that Rudolf Peierls had been under investigation as a Soviet agent, and was forced to make an out-of-court settlement when Peierls sued him. (The equally controversial Rupert Allason, who once worked for McCormick, has continued to press this particular claim after Peierls's death.) McCormick also claimed that the early twentieth-century economist Arthur Pigou had been a Russian agent, and to be in possession of Pigou's journal: no such journal has surfaced since McCormick's death.

An assessment by a number of academics and specialists of what has been termed McCormick's "fraudulent career", which includes evidence supplied by his personal papers, was published (2015) as the third volume of a biography of economist Friedrich Hayek.

McCormick's Jack the Ripper research has been criticized by academics. He promoted Alexander Pedachenko as a suspect. McCormick was accused of fabricating data by inventing fictitious sources and was described as a "prominent hoaxer".

== Works ==
- The Identity of Jack the Ripper. London: Jarrolds, 1959.
- The Mystery of Lord Kitchener's Death. Putnam, 1959.
- Peddler of Death: the life and times of Sir Basil Zaharoff. New York: Holt, Rinehart and Winston, 1965.
- Temple of Love. New York: Citadel Press. 1965.
- The Red Barn Mystery: some new evidence on an old murder. London: John Long, 1967.
- John Dee: Scientist, Geographer, Astrologer and Secret Agent to Elizabeth I. London: Frederick Muller, 1968.
- Murder By Witchcraft. London: John Long, 1968.
- A History of the British Secret Service. London: Frederick Muller, 1969. New York: Taplinger, 1970. Reprinted in paperback, London: Grafton, 1991. Italian Edition: Club Degli Editori ed., Milano, 1973. Translation by Rosanna Pelà.
- Murder by Perfection: Maundy Gregory, the Man Behind Two Unsolved Mysteries?. London: Jarrolds, 1970.
- A History of the Russian Secret Service. New York: Taplinger, 1972. London: Frederick Muller, 1972.
- The Chinese Secret Service. New York: Taplinger, 1974. [pb] Revised and updated. London: Grafton Books, 1989.
- The Hell-Fire Club : the story of the amorous Knights of Wycombe. London: Sphere, 1975.
- Matthew Hopkins: Witchfinder General. London: Frederick Muller, 1976.
- A Biography of William Caxton: The First English Editor, Printer, Merchant and Translator. London: Frederick Muller, 1976.
- Napoleon's Book of Fate: Its Origins and Uses. New York: Citadel Press. 1976.
- Who's Who in Spy Fiction. London: Sphere, 1977.
- The Israeli Secret Service. London: Hamish Hamilton, 1977.
- The Silent War: A History of Western Naval Intelligence. Newton Abbot, UK: David & Charles, 1978. New York: Hippocrene Books, 1978.
- The British Connection: Russia's Manipulation of British Individuals and Institutions, London: Hamish Hamilton. 1979. Later withdrawn.
- Escape! London: BBC, 1980.
- Love in Code, or, How to Keep Your Secrets. London: Eyre Methuen, 1980.
- Kempai Tai: A History of the Japanese Secret Service. London: Muller, 1982. New York: Beaufort Books, 1983. Revised and updated edition, Tokyo: Charles Tuttle Books, 1990.
- With My Little Eye: The Memoirs of a Spy-Hunter. London: Frederick Muller, 1982.
- "C": A Biography of Sir Maurice Oldfield. London: MacDonald, 1985.
- The Cambridge Apostles: A History of Cambridge University's Elite Intellectual Secret Society. New York: Farrar, Straus, 1986.
- Spyclopedia: The Comprehensive Handbook of Espionage. New York: Morrow, 1987.
- The Truth Twisters. London: Macdonald, 1987.
- The Greatest Treason: The Bizarre Story of Hollis, Liddell and Mountbatten. London: Century, 1990. (A 1989 printing had resulted in a libel suit and was withdrawn; this edition had the offending material withdrawn.)
- Super Spy: The Man Who Infiltrated the Kremlin and the Gestapo. UK: Futura, 1990.
- The French Secret Service. London: Grafton, 1990.
- The Life of Ian Fleming. Dufour Editions, 1994.
