= Jack the Dripper =

Jack the Dripper may refer to:

- Nickname of Jackson Pollock, American painter
- Online pseudonym of Jack Teixeira

== See also ==
- Jack the Dripper at Peg's Place, an art exhibition by Mike Bidlo
- Jack the Ripper (disambiguation)
