= From Hell (disambiguation) =

From Hell is a graphic novel by writer Alan Moore and artist Eddie Campbell, about Jack the Ripper and the Whitechapel murders

From Hell may also refer to:

- From Hell (film), a 2001 American/British film, loosely based on the comic book series
- From Hell letter, the original letter, purported from Jack the Ripper
- From Hell (EP), a 2006 EP by Walls of Jericho
- ...from Hell, a British TV documentary series, about various events.
- "From Hell" (The IT Crowd), the first episode of the third series of the British comedy series The IT Crowd

== See also ==
- Whitechapel murders, associated with Jack the Ripper
- Jack the Ripper (disambiguation), from the Whitechapel murders
