= Casebook: Jack the Ripper =

Website

Casebook: Jack the Ripper is a website devoted to the historical mystery of the Jack the Ripper murders of Whitechapel and the surrounding areas of London in 1888 and possibly other years. The site was started in January 1996 and features suspect, victim and witness overviews as well as more than two-thousand contemporary press reports. Modern-day articles, book and film reviews, police biographies and an active online forum are also available.

The site continues under the editorship of its founder, Stephen P. Ryder, and has been lauded as "one of the most important resources for Ripper information today."
