= Thomas Vere Bayne =

British academic

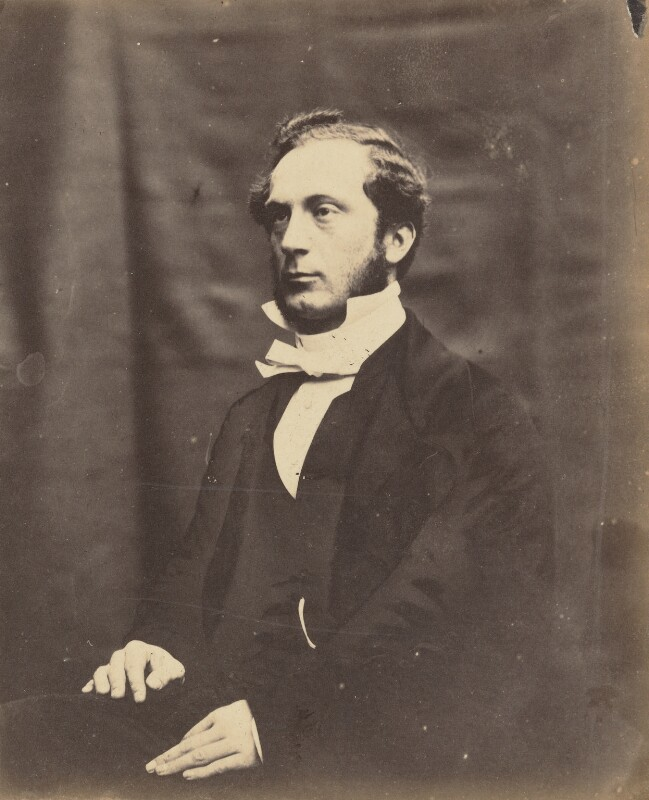
- Born: 1829
- Died: 1908
- Occupations: academic; archivist
- Employer: University of Oxford

Thomas Vere Bayne (1829–1908) was an academic at the University of Oxford. He was a friend of Charles Dodgson, better known as Lewis Carroll, the author of the Alice in Wonderland books.

== Life ==
Bayne was the son of Thomas Vere Bayne, who had studied at Jesus College, Oxford and who was a master at Warrington School from 1828 to 1842. Bayne was born in 1829. From his childhood, he was a friend of Charles Dodgson: Thomas Vere Bayne was a friend of Dodgson's father Charles and used to visit him at Daresbury; the two sons went on to study and work at the same Oxford college. Bayne matriculated at the University of Oxford as a member of Christ Church on 14 June 1848, and became a Fellow (called a "Student" at Christ Church) in 1849. He obtained his BA degree in 1852 and his MA in 1855, and was an ordained Anglican priest. From 1861 to 1882 he was Curator of Common Room in Christ Church, a post in which he was succeeded by Dodgson. He was university Proctor in 1867, and became Keeper of the Archives in 1885. He died in 1908, sometime before the Encaenia ceremony on 25 June, at which he was remembered. His estate amounted to £138,000.

In 1996, the writer Richard Wallace proposed a theory in his book Jack the Ripper, Light-Hearted Friend that Dodgson and Bayne were responsible for the Jack the Ripper murders. The theory was based on anagrams from two of Carroll's works. However, the theory has been criticised as seriously flawed (not least because they have alibis for some of the murders, and both had problems with their health), and Dodgson and Bayne are not generally regarded as likely suspects.
