= Jack the Ripper suspects =

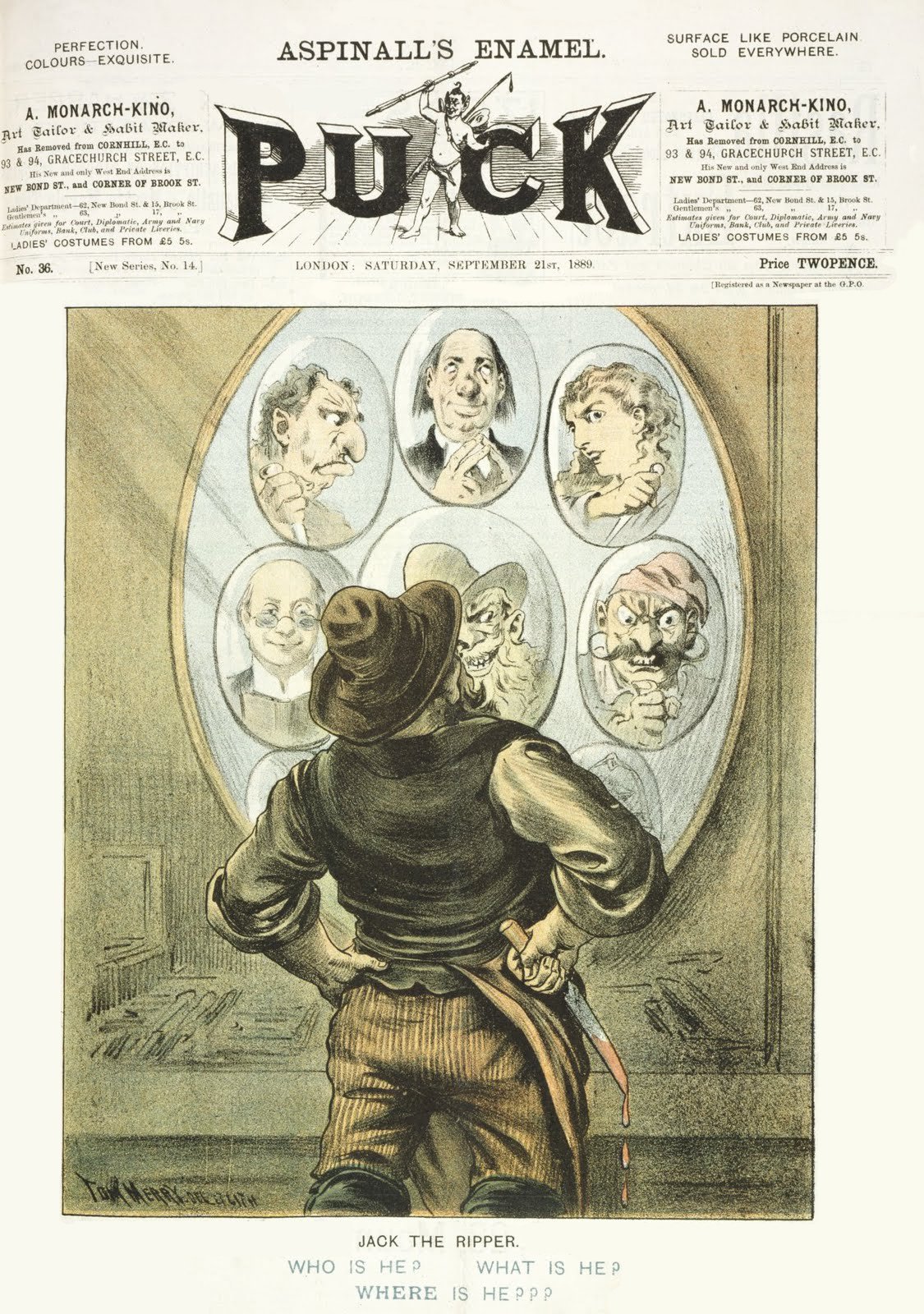
The cover of the 21 September 1889 issue of Puck magazine, featuring cartoonist Tom Merry's depiction of the unidentified Whitechapel murderer Jack the Ripper.

A series of murders that took place in the East End of London between August and November 1888 have been attributed to an unidentified assailant nicknamed Jack the Ripper. Since then, the identity of the Ripper has been widely debated, with over 100 suspects named. Though many theories have been advanced, experts find none widely persuasive, and some are hardly taken seriously at all.

== Contemporaneous police opinion ==
Metropolitan Police files show that their investigation into the serial killings encompassed eleven separate murders between 1888 and 1891, known in the police docket as the "Whitechapel murders". Five of these—the murders of Mary Ann Nichols, Annie Chapman, Elizabeth Stride, Catherine Eddowes and Mary Jane Kelly—are generally agreed to be the work of a single killer, known as "Jack the Ripper". These murders occurred between August and November 1888 within a short distance of each other and are collectively known as the "canonical five". The six other murders—those of Emma Elizabeth Smith, Martha Tabram, Rose Mylett, Alice McKenzie, Frances Coles, and the Pinchin Street torso—have been linked with the Ripper to varying degrees.

The swiftness of the attacks and the manner of the mutilations performed on some of the bodies, which included disembowelment and removal of organs, led to speculation that the murderer had the skills of a physician or butcher. However, others disagreed strongly, and thought the wounds too crude to be professional. The alibis of local butchers and slaughterers were investigated, with the result that they were eliminated from the inquiry. Over 2,000 people were interviewed, "upwards of 300" people were investigated, and 80 people were detained.

During the course of their investigations of the murders, police regarded several men as strong suspects, but none were formally charged.

=== George Chapman ===
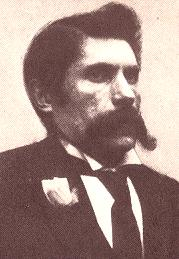
George Chapman

Seweryn Antonowicz Kłosowski (a.k.a. George Chapman; no relation to victim Annie Chapman; 14 December 1865 – 7 April 1903) was born in Congress Poland but emigrated to the United Kingdom sometime between 1887 and 1888—shortly before the start of the Whitechapel murders. Between 1893 and 1894, he assumed the name of Chapman. He successively poisoned three of his wives and became known as "the Borough poisoner". He was hanged for his crimes in 1903. At the time of the Ripper murders, he lived in Whitechapel, London, where he had been working as a barber under the name Ludwig Schloski. According to H. L. Adam, who wrote a book on the poisonings in 1930, Chapman was Inspector Frederick Abberline's favoured suspect, and the Pall Mall Gazette reported that Abberline suspected Chapman after his conviction. Some argue against the idea that Chapman was the likely culprit, as he killed his three wives using poison. It is uncommon, though not unheard of, for a serial killer to make such a drastic change in their modus operandi.

=== Montague John Druitt ===
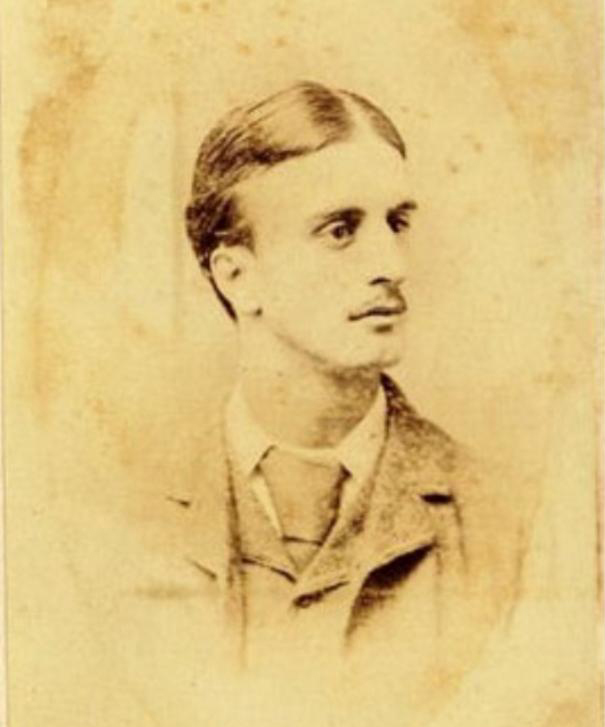
Montague John Druitt

Montague John Druitt (15 August 1857 – early December 1888) was a Dorset-born barrister who worked to supplement his income as an assistant schoolmaster in Blackheath, London, until his dismissal shortly before his suicide by drowning in 1888. His decomposed body was found floating in the Thames near Chiswick on 31 December 1888. Some modern authors suggest that Druitt may have been dismissed because he was homosexual and that this could have driven him to commit suicide. However, both his mother and his grandmother suffered mental health problems, and it is possible that he was dismissed because of an underlying hereditary psychiatric illness. He was said to be "sexually insane" and was allegedly suspected of being the Ripper by members of his family. His death shortly after the last canonical murder (which took place on 9 November 1888) led Assistant Chief Constable Sir Melville Macnaghten to name him as a suspect in a memorandum of 23 February 1894. However, Macnaghten incorrectly described the 31-year-old barrister as a 41-year-old doctor. On 1 September, the day after the first "canonical" murder, Druitt was in Dorset playing cricket; most experts now believe that the killer was local to Whitechapel, whereas Druitt lived miles away, on the other side of the Thames, in Kent. Inspector Frederick Abberline appeared to dismiss Druitt as a serious suspect on the basis that the only evidence against him was the coincidental timing of his suicide shortly after the last canonical murder.

=== Jacob Isenschmid ===
Jacob Isenschmid, or Joseph Isenschmid (born c. 1845), was a Swiss butcher living in the Milford Road. He experienced severe depression and other psychiatric disorders, and he had a history of violent attacks on women in the Whitechapel area, which had led to his hospitalization for psychiatric treatment in the past. On 11 September 1888, two physicians reported to the police that they suspected Isenschmid of being the Ripper due to his strange habits. Isenschmid's wife told police that he was violent and erratic, that he always carried large knives (even when they were not required for his trade), that he had threatened to kill her on at least one occasion, and that he had left home for no reason two months prior and returned only sporadically. Isenschmid was arrested on 13 September, and a psychiatric evaluation found he was violently insane and potentially dangerous, with a judge ordering him imprisoned in a mental hospital. However, the "Double Event" murders of Elizabeth Stride and Catherine Eddowes occurred on 30 September while Isenschmid was in the hospital, exonerating him of the murders.

=== Aaron Kosminski ===
Aaron Kosminski (born Aron Mordke Kozminski; 11 September 1865 – 24 March 1919) was a Polish Jew admitted to Colney Hatch Lunatic Asylum in 1891. "Kosminski" (no forename given) was named as a suspect by Sir Melville Macnaghten in his 1894 memorandum and by former Chief Inspector Donald Swanson in handwritten comments in the margin of his copy of Assistant Commissioner Sir Robert Anderson's memoirs.

Anderson wrote that "the only person who had ever had a good view of the murderer unhesitatingly identified the suspect the instant he was confronted with him". This suspect also apparently fit their profile: "a sexual maniac of a virulent type; that he was living in the immediate vicinity of the scenes of the murders; and that, if he was not living immediately alone, his people knew of his guilt, and refused to give him up to justice". Furthermore, a "house-to-house search was conducted" for "the case of every man in the district whose circumstances were such that he could go and come and get rid of his bloodstains in secret". Sir Robert Anderson goes on to state the conclusion the police came to following this investigation "was that he [Jack the Ripper] and his people were certain low-class Polish Jews" but since the person who identified him was also a Polish Jew and "people of that class in the East End will not give up one of their number to Gentile justice", the suspect was never prosecuted. Anderson was firmly convinced of the suspect's guilt, also writing within the "Whitechapel Murders" section of his memoirs that "'undiscovered murders' are rare in London and the 'Jack-the-Ripper' crimes are not within that category". Some authors are sceptical of this, while others use it in their theories.

In his memorandum, Macnaghten stated that no one was ever identified as the Ripper, which directly contradicts Anderson's recollection. In 1987, author Martin Fido searched asylum records for any inmates called Kosminski and found only one: Aaron Kosminski. Kosminski lived in Whitechapel, but he was largely harmless in the asylum. His insanity took the form of auditory hallucinations, a paranoid fear of being fed by other people, a refusal to wash or bathe, and "self-abuse". In his book The Cases That Haunt Us, former FBI profiler John E. Douglas stated that a paranoid individual such as Kosminski would likely have openly boasted of the murders while incarcerated had he been the killer, but there is no record that he ever did so.

It is possible Kosminski was confused with another Polish Jew of the same age named Aaron or David Cohen (real name possibly Nathan Kaminsky), who was a violent patient at the Colney Hatch Asylum. In 2014, DNA analysis tenuously linked Kosminski with a shawl said to have belonged to victim Catherine Eddowes, but experts—including Sir Alec Jeffreys, the inventor of genetic fingerprinting—dismissed the DNA-based claims about Kosminski as unreliable. This was because the genetic match, determined from maternal descendants of Eddowes and Kosminski, was based on mitochondrial DNA. Mitochondrial DNA can be shared by thousands of individuals and, therefore, can be reliably used in crime analysis only to exclude suspects, not to implicate them. Many consider it conjecture without substantial evidence that the shawl, allegedly taken from the crime scene by police constable Amos Simpson, even belonged to Eddowes—who was impoverished and arguably could not have afforded to purchase it herself. In March 2019, the Journal of Forensic Sciences published a study that claimed DNA from both Kosminski and Eddowes was found on the shawl. A 2019 BBC documentary entitled Jack the Ripper: The Case Reopened, broadcast and presented by Emilia Fox, concluded that Kosminski was the most likely suspect. Other scientists cast doubt on the study, and the journal printed an expression of concern after the authors were unable to produce the original data.

=== Michael Ostrog ===
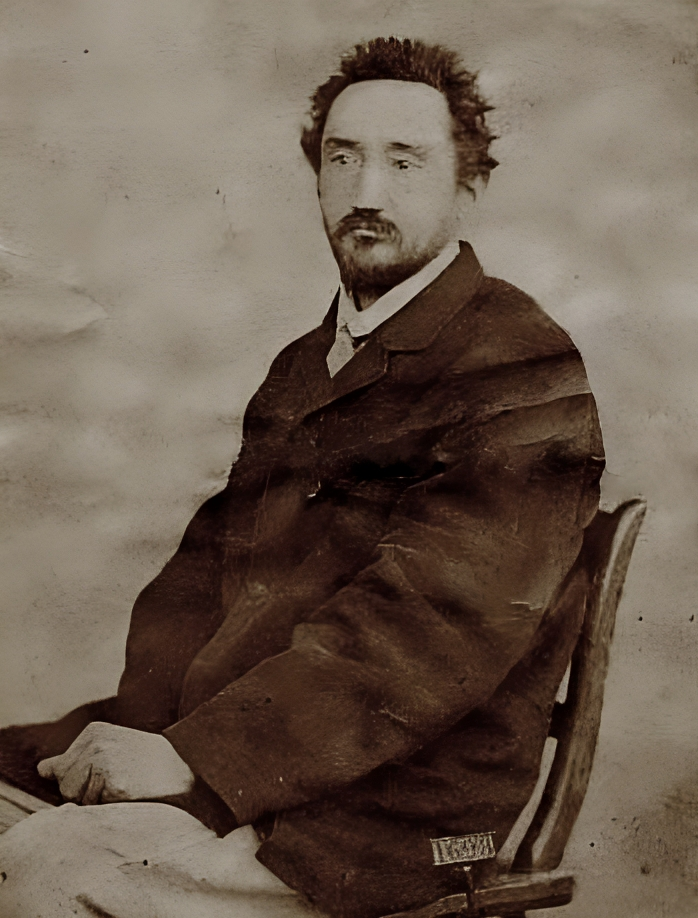
Michael Ostrog

Michael Ostrog (c. 1833 – in or after 1904) was a Russian-born professional con man and thief. He used numerous aliases and assumed titles. Among his many dubious claims was that he had once been a surgeon in the Russian Navy. He was mentioned as a suspect by Macnaghten, who joined the case in 1889, the year after the "canonical five" victims were killed. Researchers have failed to find evidence that he had committed crimes any more serious than fraud and theft. Author Philip Sugden discovered prison records showing that Ostrog was jailed for petty offences in France during the Ripper murders. Ostrog was last mentioned alive in 1904; the date of his death is unknown.

=== John Pizer ===
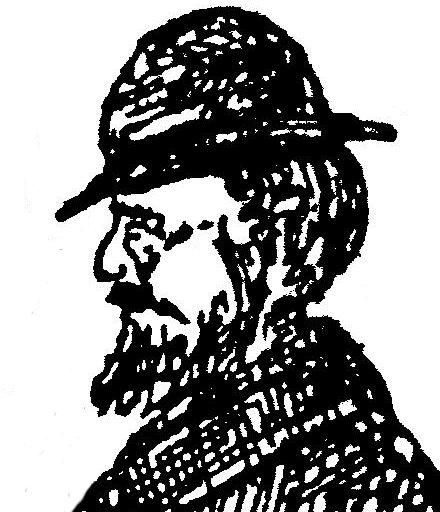
John Pizer

John Pizer (or Piser; c. 1850 – 1897) was a Polish Jew who worked as a bootmaker in Whitechapel. In the early days of the Whitechapel murders, many locals suspected that "Leather Apron" was the killer, which was picked up by the press; Pizer was known as "Leather Apron". He had a prior conviction for a stabbing offence, and Police Sergeant William Thicke apparently believed that he had committed a string of minor assaults on prostitutes. After the murders of Mary Ann Nichols and Annie Chapman in late August and early September 1888, respectively, Thicke arrested Pizer on 10 September even though the investigating inspector reported that "there is no evidence whatsoever against him". He was cleared of suspicion when it turned out that he had alibis for two of the murders. He was staying with relatives at the time of one of the murders, and he was talking with a police officer while watching a spectacular fire on the London Docks at the time of another. Pizer and Thicke had known each other for years, and Pizer implied that his arrest was based on animosity rather than evidence. Pizer successfully obtained monetary compensation from at least one newspaper that had named him as the murderer. Thicke himself was accused of being the Ripper by H. T. Haslewood of Tottenham in a letter to the Home Office dated 10 September 1889; the presumably malicious accusation was dismissed as without foundation.

=== James Thomas Sadler ===
James Thomas Sadler or Saddler (c. 1837 – 1906 or 1910) was a friend of Frances Coles, the last victim added to the Whitechapel murders police file. Coles was murdered on 13 February 1891. Her body was discovered beneath a railway arch in Swallow Gardens, Whitechapel. Two deep slash wounds had been inflicted on her neck. She was still alive but died before medical help could arrive. Sadler was arrested, but little evidence existed against him. Although briefly considered by the police as a Ripper suspect, he was at sea at the time of the first four "canonical" murders and was released without charge. Sadler was named in Macnaghten's 1894 memorandum in connection with Coles's murder. Macnaghten thought Sadler "was a man of ungovernable temper and entirely addicted to drink, and the company of the lowest prostitutes".

=== Francis Tumblety ===

Francis Tumblety (c. 1833 – 1903) earned a small fortune posing as an "Indian Herb" doctor throughout the United States and Canada and was commonly perceived as a misogynist and a quack. He was connected to the death of one of his patients but escaped prosecution. In 1865, he was arrested for alleged complicity in the assassination of Abraham Lincoln, but no connection was found and he was released without being charged. Tumblety was in England in 1888 and was arrested on 7 November, apparently for engaging in homosexual acts, which were illegal at the time. Some of his friends reported that he showed off a collection of "matrices" (wombs) from "every class of woman" at around this time. Awaiting trial, he fled to France and then to the United States. Already notorious in the States for his self-promotion and previous criminal charges, his arrest was reported as connected to the Ripper murders. American reports that Scotland Yard tried to extradite him were not confirmed by the British press or the London police, and the New York City Police said, "there is no proof of his complicity in the Whitechapel murders, and the crime for which he is under bond in London is not extraditable". In 1913, Tumblety was mentioned as a Ripper suspect by Chief Inspector John Littlechild of the Metropolitan Police Service in a letter to journalist and author George R. Sims.

== Contemporaneous press and public opinion ==
The Whitechapel murders were featured heavily in the media and attracted the attention of Victorian society at large. Journalists, letter writers, and amateur detectives all suggested names either in the press or to the police. Most were not and could not be taken seriously. For example, at the time of the murders, Richard Mansfield, a famous actor, starred in a theatrical version of Robert Louis Stevenson's book Strange Case of Dr Jekyll and Mr Hyde. The subject matter of horrific murder in the London streets and Mansfield's convincing portrayal led letter writers to accuse him of being the Ripper.

=== William Henry Bury ===
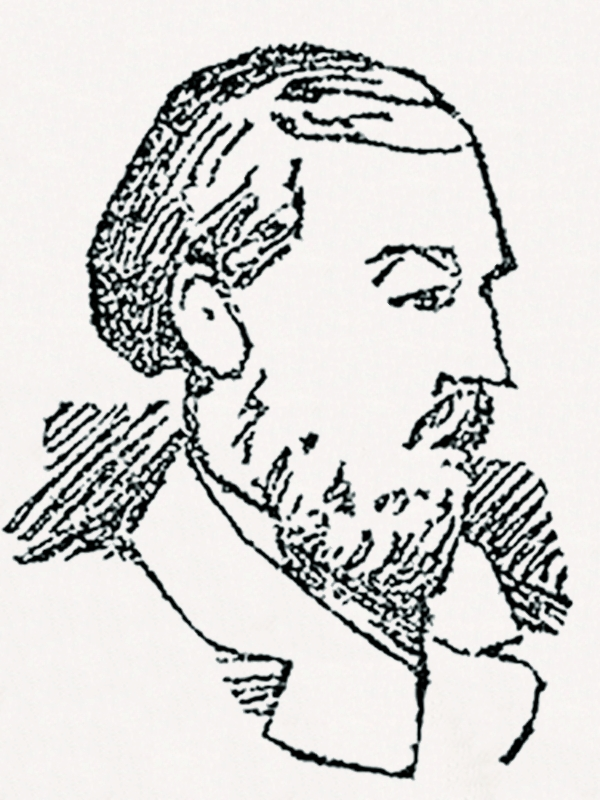
William Henry Bury

William Henry Bury (25 May 1859 – 24 April 1889) had recently moved to Dundee from the East End of London, when he strangled his wife Ellen Elliott, a former prostitute, on 4 February 1889. He inflicted extensive wounds to her abdomen after she was dead and packed the body into a trunk. On 10 February, Bury went to the local police and told them his wife had committed suicide. He was arrested, tried, found guilty of her murder, and hanged in Dundee. A link with the Ripper crimes was investigated by police, but Bury denied any connection, despite making a full confession to his wife's homicide. Nevertheless, the executioner, James Berry, promoted the idea that Bury was the Ripper. This hypothesis was built upon by historians Euan Macpherson and William Beadle, who argued that comments by Ellen had indicated she had inside knowledge of the Ripper's whereabouts. There was also graffiti at Bury's flat accusing the occupant of being "Jack Ripper", which Macpherson argues Bury had written as a form of confession, and the final of the Ripper's five "canonical" murders occurred shortly before Bury moved away from Whitechapel. Upon arrest, Bury had remarked to Lieutenant James Parr that he was afraid of being accused of being the Ripper and an acquaintance of his claimed that Bury had thrown down a newspaper with a loud cry after being asked to look up news of the Ripper. However, Ellen Elliott had been strangled to death and had only light cuts to her abdomen, whereas the victims of the Ripper had their throats cut and had much more extensive abdominal wounds.

=== Thomas Neill Cream ===
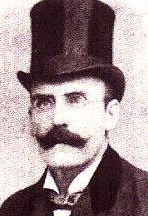
Dr Thomas Neil Cream

Dr. Thomas Neill Cream (27 May 1850 – 15 November 1892) was a doctor secretly specialising in abortions. He was born in Glasgow, educated in London and Canada, and entered practice in Canada and later in Chicago, Illinois. In 1881 he was found guilty of the fatal poisoning of his mistress's husband. He was imprisoned in the Illinois State Penitentiary in Joliet, Illinois, from November 1881 until his release on good behaviour on 31 July 1891. He moved to London, where he resumed killing and was soon arrested. He was hanged on 15 November 1892 at Newgate Prison. According to some sources, his last words were reported as being "I am Jack the...", interpreted to mean Jack the Ripper. However, police officials who attended the execution made no mention of this alleged interrupted confession. As he was still imprisoned at the time of the Ripper murders, most authorities consider it impossible for him to have been the culprit. However, Donald Bell suggested that he could have bribed officials and left the prison before his official release, and Sir Edward Marshall-Hall suspected that his prison term may have been served by a look-alike in his place. Such notions are unlikely and contradict evidence given by the Illinois authorities, newspapers of the time, Cream's solicitors, Cream's family and Cream himself.

=== Thomas Hayne Cutbush ===
Thomas Hayne Cutbush (1865–1903) was a medical student sent to Lambeth Infirmary in 1891 suffering delusions thought to have been caused by syphilis. After stabbing a woman in the backside and attempting to stab a second, he was pronounced insane and committed to Broadmoor Hospital in 1891, where he remained until his death in 1903. In a series of articles in 1894, The Sun newspaper suggested that Cutbush was the Ripper. There is no evidence that police took the idea seriously, and Melville Macnaghten's memorandum naming the three police suspects—Druitt, Kosminski and Ostrog—was written to refute the idea that Cutbush was the Ripper. Cutbush was the suspect advanced in a 1993 book by A. P. Wolf, who suggested that Macnaghten wrote his memo to protect Cutbush's uncle, a fellow police officer. In a 2011 book, author Peter Hodgson considers Cutbush the most likely candidate. David Bullock, in his 2012 book, also firmly believes Cutbush to be the real Ripper.

=== Frederick Bailey Deeming ===
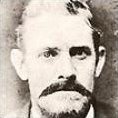
Frederick Bailey Deeming

Frederick Bailey Deeming (30 July 1853 – 23 May 1892) murdered his first wife and four children in Rainhill near St. Helens, Lancashire, in 1891. His crimes went undiscovered and later that year he emigrated to Australia with his second wife, whom he then also murdered. Her body was found buried under their house, and the subsequent investigation led to the discovery of the other bodies in England. He was arrested, sent to trial, and found guilty. He wrote in a book, and later boasted in jail that he was Jack the Ripper, but he was either imprisoned or in South Africa at the time of the Ripper murders. The police denied any connection between Deeming and the Ripper. He was hanged in Melbourne. According to Robert Napper, a former Scotland Yard detective, the British police did not consider him a suspect because of his two possible alibis but Napper believed Deeming was not in jail at the time, and there is some evidence that he was back in England.

=== Carl Feigenbaum ===
Carl Ferdinand Feigenbaum (alias Anton Zahn; 1840 – 27 April 1896) was a German merchant seaman arrested in 1894 in New York City for cutting the throat of Mrs Juliana Hoffmann. After his execution, his lawyer, William Sanford Lawton, claimed that Feigenbaum had admitted to having a hatred of women and a desire to kill and mutilate them. Lawton further stated that he believed Feigenbaum was Jack the Ripper. Though covered by the press at the time, the idea was not pursued for more than a century. Using Lawton's accusation as a base, author Trevor Marriott argued that Feigenbaum was responsible for the Ripper murders as well as other murders in the United States and Germany between 1891 and 1894. According to Wolf Vanderlinden, some of the murders listed by Marriott did not actually occur; the newspapers often embellished or created Ripper-like stories to boost sales. Lawton's accusations were disputed by a partner in his legal firm, Hugh O. Pentecost, and there is no proof that Feigenbaum was in Whitechapel at the time of the murders. Xanthé Mallett, a Scottish forensic anthropologist and criminologist who investigated the case in 2011, wrote there is considerable doubt that all of the Jack the Ripper murders were committed by the same person. She concludes that "Feigenbaum could have been responsible for one, some or perhaps all" of the Whitechapel murders.

=== Robert Donston Stephenson ===
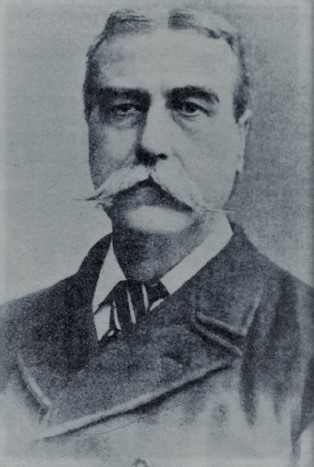
Robert Donston Stephenson

Robert Donston Stephenson (also known as Roslyn D'Onston; 20 April 1841 – 9 October 1916) was a journalist and writer interested in the occult and black magic. He admitted himself as a patient at the London Hospital in Whitechapel shortly before the murders started, and left shortly after they ceased. He wrote a newspaper article in which he claimed that black magic was the motive for the killings and alleged that the Ripper was a Frenchman. Stephenson's strange manner and interest in the crimes resulted in an amateur detective reporting him to Scotland Yard on Christmas Eve, 1888. Two days later Stephenson reported his own suspect, a Dr Morgan Davies of the London Hospital. Subsequently, he fell under the suspicion of newspaper editor William Thomas Stead. In his books on the case, author and historian Melvin Harris argued that Stephenson was a leading suspect, but the police do not appear to have treated either him or Dr Davies as serious suspects. London Hospital night-shift rosters and practices indicate that Stephenson was not able to leave on the nights of the murders and hence could not have been Jack the Ripper.

== Proposed by later authors ==
Suspects proposed years after the murders include virtually anyone remotely connected to the case by contemporary documents, as well as many famous names, who were not considered in the police investigation at all. As everyone alive at the time is now dead, modern authors are free to accuse anyone they can, "without any need for any supporting historical evidence". Most of their suggestions cannot be taken seriously, and include English novelist George Gissing, British prime minister William Ewart Gladstone, and syphilitic artist Frank Miles.

=== Prince Albert Victor, Duke of Clarence and Avondale ===
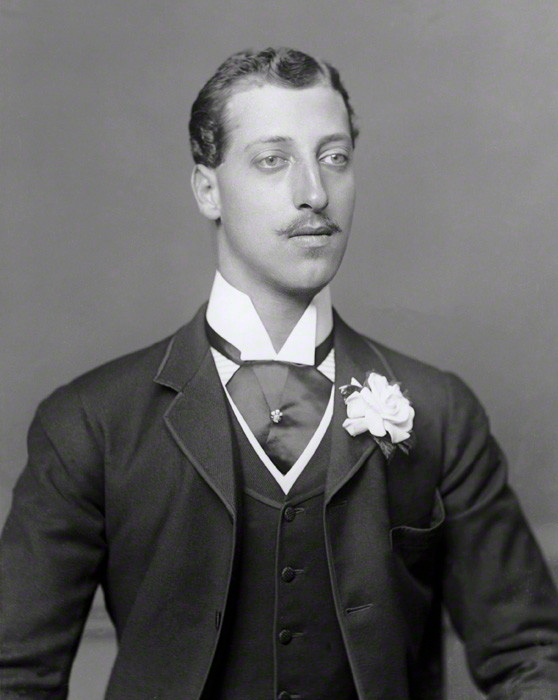
Prince Albert

Prince Albert Victor, Duke of Clarence and Avondale was first mentioned in print as a potential suspect when Philippe Jullian's biography of Prince Albert Victor's father, King Edward VII, was published in 1962. Jullian made a passing reference to rumours that Prince Albert Victor might have been responsible for the murders. Though Jullian did not detail the dates or sources of the rumour, it is possible that the rumour derived indirectly from Dr Thomas E. A. Stowell. In 1960, Stowell told the rumour to writer Colin Wilson, who in turn told Harold Nicolson, a biographer loosely credited as a source of "hitherto unpublished anecdotes" in Jullian's book. Nicolson could have communicated Stowell's theory to Jullian. The theory was brought to major public attention in 1970 when an article by Stowell was published in The Criminologist that revealed his suspicion that Prince Albert Victor had committed the murders after being driven mad by syphilis. The suggestion was widely dismissed, as Prince Albert Victor had strong alibis for the murders, and it is unlikely that he suffered from syphilis. Stowell later denied implying that Prince Albert Victor was the Ripper but efforts to investigate his claims further were hampered, as Stowell was elderly, and he died from natural causes just days after the publication of his article. The same week, Stowell's son reported that he had burned his father's papers, saying "I read just sufficient to make certain that there was nothing of importance."

Subsequently, conspiracy theorists, such as Stephen Knight in Jack the Ripper: The Final Solution, have elaborated on the supposed involvement of Prince Albert Victor in the murders. Rather than implicate Albert Victor directly, they claim that he secretly married and had a daughter with a Catholic shop assistant, and that Queen Victoria, British Prime Minister Lord Salisbury, his Freemason friends, and the Metropolitan Police conspired to murder anyone aware of Albert Victor's supposed child. Many facts contradict this theory and its originator, Joseph Gorman (also known as Joseph Sickert), later retracted the story and admitted to the press that it was a hoax. Variations of the theory involve the physician William Gull, the artist Walter Sickert, and the poet James Kenneth Stephen to greater or lesser degrees, and have been fictionalised in novels and films, such as Murder by Decree and From Hell.

=== Joseph Barnett ===
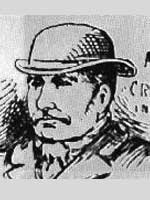
Joseph Barnett

Joseph Barnett (c. 1858–1927) was a former fish porter, and victim Mary Kelly's lover from 8 April 1887 to 30 October 1888, when they quarrelled and separated after he lost his job and she returned to prostitution to make a living. Inspector Abberline questioned him for four hours after Kelly's murder, and his clothes were examined for bloodstains, but he was then released without charge. A century after the murders, author Bruce Paley proposed him as a suspect as Kelly's scorned or jealous lover, and suggested that he'd committed the other murders to scare Kelly off the streets and out of prostitution. Other authors suggest he killed Kelly only, and mutilated the body to make it look like a Ripper murder, but Abberline's investigation appears to have exonerated him. Other acquaintances of Kelly put forward as her murderer include her landlord John McCarthy and her former boyfriend Joseph Fleming.

=== Lewis Carroll ===
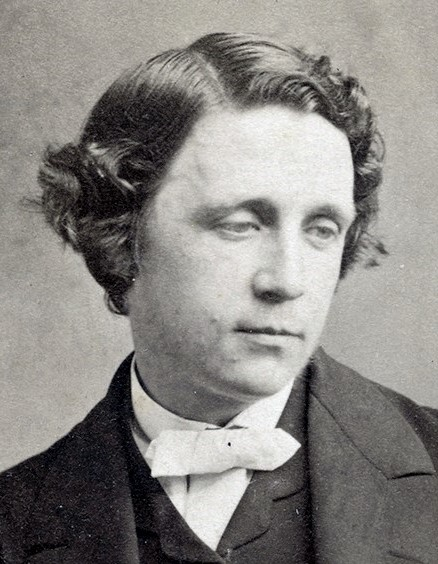
Lewis Caroll

Lewis Carroll (pen name of Charles Lutwidge Dodgson; 27 January 1832 – 14 January 1898) was the author of Alice's Adventures in Wonderland and Through the Looking-Glass. He was named as a suspect based upon anagrams which author Richard Wallace devised for his book Jack the Ripper, Light-Hearted Friend. Wallace argues that Carroll had a psychotic breakdown after being assaulted by a man when he was 12. Moreover, according to Wallace, Carroll wrote a diary every day in purple ink, but on the days of the Whitechapel killings, he switched to black. This claim is not taken seriously by scholars. When an excerpt of Wallace's book appeared in Harper's, a letter to the editor written by Guy Jacobson and Francis Heaney took the first paragraph of Wallace's excerpt and produced an anagram that had Wallace confessing to the murder of Nicole Brown and the framing of O. J. Simpson, thus demonstrating how incriminating anagrams could be produced from any reasonably lengthy passage.

=== Willy Clarkson ===
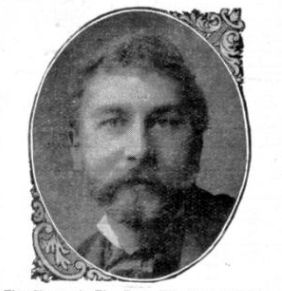
Willy Clarkson

William Berry "Willy" Clarkson (1861 – 12 October 1934) was the royal wigmaker and costume-maker to Queen Victoria and lived approximately two miles (3.2 km) from each of the canonical five crime scenes. He was first named as a suspect in 2019, with many of the assertions based on Clarkson's 1937 biography written by Harry J. Greenwall. Clarkson is known to have stalked his ex-fiancée and was reputedly a blackmailer and arsonist. He is suspected of committing the murders to cover up his blackmail schemes. Evidence presented to support the theory of Clarkson as a suspect included the revelation that he admitted one of his custom-made wigs was found near the scene of one of the Ripper killings, a fact not previously widely known in the "ripperology" community. Additionally, Clarkson's biography quotes him as stating that the police obtained disguises from him for their search for the Ripper, and as such, he would have been aware of the trails they followed, allowing him to elude capture. Hair-cutting shears and barber-surgeon tools (his father or grandfather allegedly being a barber-surgeon) of the kind used by a wig-maker at the time closely match the shape and style of the weapons suspected to have been used in the murders.

=== David Cohen ===
David Cohen (1865 – 20 October 1889) was a 23-year-old Polish Jew whose incarceration at Colney Hatch Lunatic Asylum on 7 December 1888 roughly coincided with the end of the murders. An unmarried tailor, Cohen was described as a violently antisocial, poor East End local. He was suggested as a suspect by author and ripperologist Martin Fido in his book The Crimes, Detection and Death of Jack the Ripper (1987).

Fido claimed that the name "David Cohen" was a generic substitute, used at that time to refer to any Jewish immigrant who either could not be positively identified, or whose name was too difficult for police to spell, much in the same fashion that "John Doe" is used in the United States today. Fido identified Cohen with "Leather Apron" (John Pizer), and speculated that Cohen's true identity was Nathan Kaminsky, a bootmaker living in Whitechapel who had been treated at one time for syphilis, and who could not be traced after May 1888, whilst records of Cohen began that December. Fido suggested that police officials confused the name Kaminsky with Kosminski, resulting in the wrong man (Aaron Kosminski) coming under suspicion.

Cohen exhibited violent, destructive tendencies while at the asylum, and had to be restrained. He died at the asylum in October 1889. In his book The Cases That Haunt Us, former FBI criminal profiler John Douglas asserted that behavioral clues gathered from the murders all point to a person "known to the police as David Cohen ... or someone very much like him".

=== Boston Corbett ===
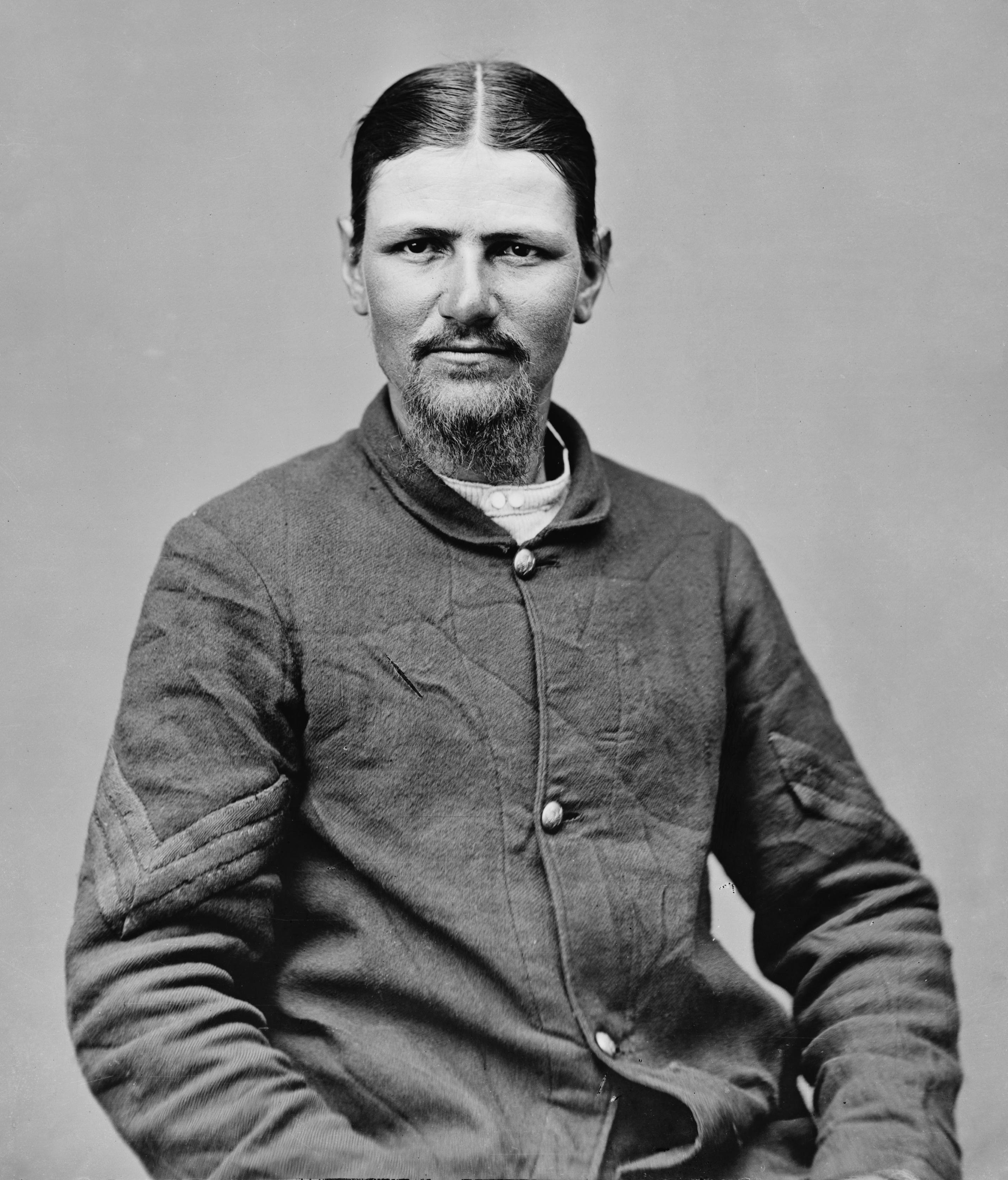
Boston Corbett

Boston Corbett (29 January 1832 – c. In or after 1888) was an English-born American soldier who killed John Wilkes Booth, the assassin of Abraham Lincoln. Corbett was known for his devout religious beliefs and eccentric behavior, and had disappeared in 1888, just a few months before the murders. Writer Dale L. Walker proposed Corbett as a suspect in the Ripper murders, stating that "Corbett was London-born. He was certifiably insane. He escaped from a Topeka insane asylum in June 1888... He was 'down on whores'. He had killed - men, to be sure- before. He was acquainted with sharp instruments in his hat finishing trade. He had motive, means, and opportunity."

=== William Withey Gull ===
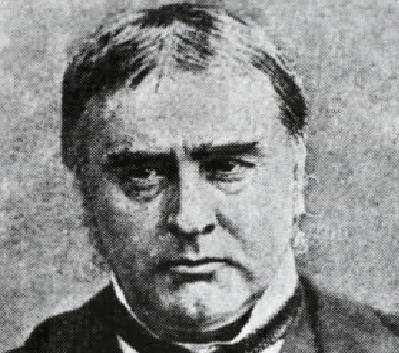
Sir William Withey Gull

Sir William Withey Gull, Bt (31 December 1816 – 29 January 1890) was physician-in-ordinary to Queen Victoria. He was named as the Ripper as part of the evolution of the widely discredited Masonic/royal conspiracy theory outlined in such books as Jack the Ripper: The Final Solution (1976). Coachman John Netley has been named as his accomplice. Thanks to the popularity of this theory among fiction writers and for its dramatic nature, Gull shows up as the Ripper in a number of books and films including the TV film Jack the Ripper (1988), Alan Moore and Eddie Campbell's graphic novel From Hell (1999), and its 2001 film adaptation, in which Ian Holm plays Gull. Conventional historians have never taken Gull seriously as a suspect due to sheer lack of evidence; in addition, he was in his seventies at the time of the murders and had recently suffered a stroke.

=== George Hutchinson ===
George Hutchinson was an unemployed labourer. On 12 November 1888, he made a formal statement to the London police that in the early hours of 9 November 1888, Mary Jane Kelly approached him in the street and asked him for money. He stated that he had then followed her and another man of conspicuous appearance to her room, and had watched the room for about three-quarters of an hour without seeing either leave. He gave a very detailed description of the man, claiming he was "of Jewish appearance", despite the darkness of that night. The accuracy of Hutchinson's statement was disputed among the senior police. Inspector Frederick Abberline, after interviewing Hutchinson, believed that Hutchinson's account was truthful. However, Robert Anderson, head of the CID, later claimed that the only witness who got a good look at the killer was Jewish. Hutchinson was not a Jew, and thus not that witness. Hutchinson's statement was made on the day that Mary Kelly's inquest was held, and he was not called to testify. Some modern scholars have suggested that Hutchinson was the Ripper himself, trying to confuse the police with a false description, but others suggest he may have just been an attention seeker who made up a story he hoped to sell to the press.

=== Hyam Hyams ===
Hyam Hyams, a cigar-maker in his mid-thirties, was a Jewish lunatic first uncovered by author Martin Fido during research for his book The Crimes, Detection and Death of Jack the Ripper while searching for the identity of the police's Jewish suspect, although he ultimately concluded it was another man (David Cohen). Hyams was later suggested as a suspect in his own right by ripperologist Mark King. According to King, Hyams, who was institutionalized repeatedly throughout his life and eventually died in an asylum in 1913, was homicidally insane and repeatedly attacked asylum staff and fellow patients. His wife, whom he had attacked with a knife in 1889, described him as suffering from epilepsy and becoming progressively more violent as his mental state declined due to periodic epileptic fits.

Sarah Bax Horton supported the theory in her 2023 book One-Armed Jack: Uncovering the Real Jack the Ripper. Bax Horton, a descendant of Harry Garrett who had been a Metropolitan Police sergeant at Leman Street Police Station, examined Hyams's medical records, which revealed that he suffered from a severe form of epilepsy and had a stiff arm and an irregular gait with bent knees, which resembles the physical description of the suspect. Bax Horton argued that the crimes coincided with his mental and physical decline which started when he broke his left arm in February 1888 and ended before his incarceration in September 1889 in the Colney Hatch Lunatic Asylum, where he remained until his death in 1913.

=== James Kelly ===
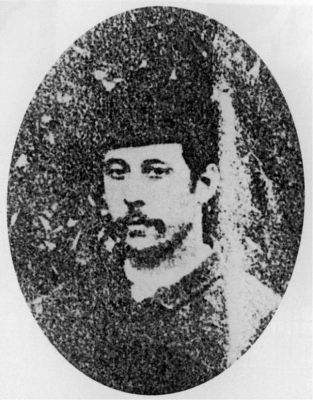
James Kelly

James Kelly (20 April 1860 – 17 September 1929; no relation to victim Mary Kelly) was first identified as a suspect in Terence Sharkey's Jack the Ripper. 100 Years of Investigation (Ward Lock 1987) and documented in Prisoner 1167: The madman who was Jack the Ripper, by Jim Tully, in 1997.

James Kelly murdered his wife in 1883 by stabbing her in the neck. Deemed insane, he was committed to the Broadmoor Asylum, from which he later escaped in early 1888, using a key he fashioned himself. The day after the November 1888 murder of Mary Jane Kelly, whose murder is widely considered by scholars to be the final murder committed by Jack the Ripper, the police searched for Kelly at what had been his residence prior to his wife's murder, but they were not able to locate him. In 1927, almost forty years after his escape, he unexpectedly turned himself in to officials at the Broadmoor Asylum. He died two years later, presumably of natural causes.

Retired New York Police Department cold-case detective Ed Norris examined the Jack the Ripper case for a Discovery Channel programme called Jack the Ripper in America. In it, Norris claims that James Kelly was Jack the Ripper and that he was also responsible for multiple murders in cities around the United States. Norris highlights a few features of the Kelly story to support his contention. Norris reported Kelly's Broadmoor Asylum file from before his escape and his eventual return had never been opened since 1927 until Norris was given special permission for access to it, and that the file is the perfect profile match for Jack the Ripper.

=== Charles Allen Lechmere ===
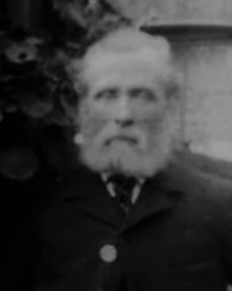
Charles Lechmere

Charles Allen Lechmere (5 October 1849 – 23 December 1920), also known as Charles Cross, was a van driver for the Pickfords company and is conventionally regarded as an innocent witness who discovered the body of the first canonical Ripper victim, Mary Ann Nichols. In a documentary titled Jack the Ripper: The New Evidence, Swedish journalist Christer Holmgren and criminologist Gareth Norris of Aberystwyth University, with assistance from former detective Andy Griffiths, proposed that Lechmere was the Ripper. According to Holmgren, Lechmere lied to police, claiming that he had been with Nichols's body for a few minutes, whereas research on his route to work from his home demonstrated that he must have been with her for about nine minutes.

Lechmere's family background is also similar to that of many serial killers in that he came from a broken home, never knew his biological father, and grew up in a series of different homes. Holmgren believes that Lechmere may have been responsible for several other murders in addition to those of the canonical five victims and Martha Tabram. Unlike any other proposed suspect, Lechmere can actually be placed at the scene of one of the crimes.

=== Jacob Levy ===
Jacob Levy (1856 – 29 July 1891) was born in Aldgate in 1856. He followed in his father's trade as a butcher, and by 1888 he was living in Middlesex Street with his wife and children, which was right in the heart of Ripper territory (and close to where Catherine Eddowes was murdered). Levy was a butcher with the necessary skills to remove certain organs from the victims, and was recorded as suffering from general paralysis of the insane. His 1890 asylum records report that he "feels that if he is not restrained he will do some violence to some one". The 2009 video game Sherlock Holmes Versus Jack the Ripper uses a combination of historically attested and embellished evidence to propose his candidacy.

Jacob Levy's life is featured on an episode of the podcast Bad Women: The Ripper Retold where Jennifer Wallis, a historian of medicine and psychiatry, comments that it is unlikely a person in Levy's condition would have been able to carry out serial murders and persistently conceal having done so.

=== James Maybrick ===
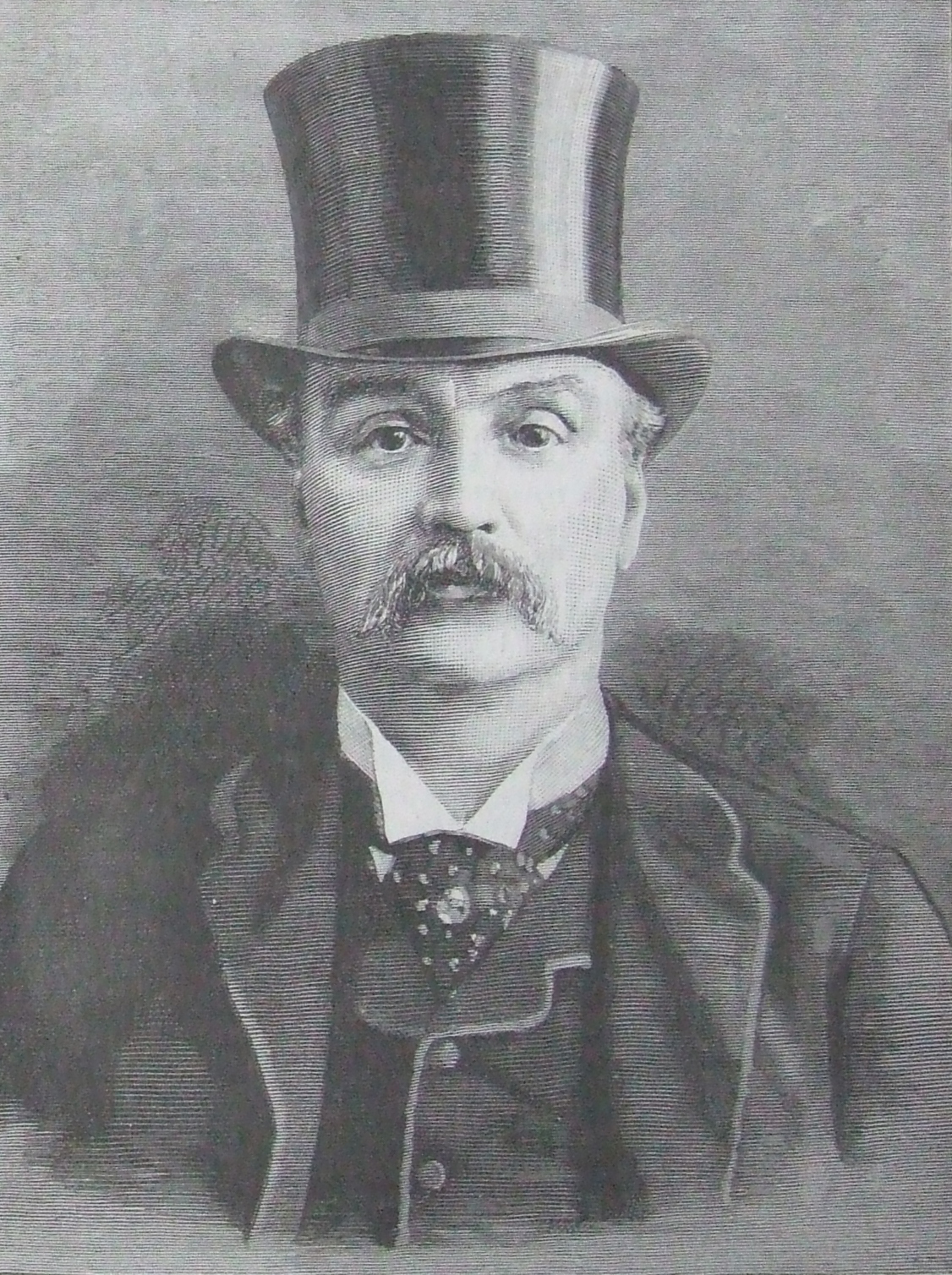
James Maybrick

James Maybrick (24 October 1838 – 11 May 1889) was a Liverpool cotton merchant. His wife Florence was convicted of poisoning him with arsenic in a sensational, and possibly unjust, trial presided over by Sir James Fitzjames Stephen, the father of another modern suspect, James Kenneth Stephen. In her book, Jack the Ripper: The American Connection author Shirley Harrison asserted James Maybrick was both Jack the Ripper and the Servant Girl Annihilator of Austin, Texas. A diary purportedly by Maybrick, published in the 1990s by Michael Barrett, contains a confession to the Ripper murders. In 1995, Barrett confessed to writing the diary himself, and described the process of counterfeiting the diary in detail. He swore under oath that he and his wife, Anne, had forged it. Anne Barrett, after their divorce, later denied forgery, and their story changed several times over the years. The diary was discredited by historians who pointed to factual errors in relation to some of the crimes, and document experts pronounced the diary a fake; the handwriting does not match that of Maybrick's will.

It has also been alleged that the ink contains the preservative chloroacetamide and that this was not commercially used in ink until 1972, although scientific testing was inconclusive. Other sources also state that chloroacetamide has been found in ink dating back to 1857. In addition to the diary, a gentleman's pocket watch made around 1847 was presented by Albert Johnson in 1993. The inside cover of the watch has the inscription "J. Maybrick" and the words "I am Jack" scratched into the inside cover alongside the initials of the Ripper's five canonical victims. Examination using electron microscopes by the University of Manchester Institute of Science and Technology and Bristol University determined based on aged brass flakes inside the scratches that they likely predated the discovery of both the watch and the diary, and therefore the idea of Maybrick as the Ripper, by several decades and could potentially have been made in the late 1880s.

=== Michael Maybrick ===
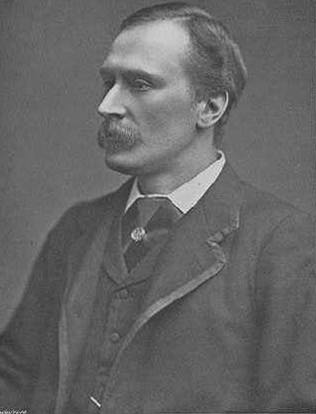
Michael Maybrick

Michael Maybrick (alias Stephen Adams; 31 January 1841 – 26 August 1913) was an English composer and singer best known under his pseudonym Stephen Adams as the composer of "The Holy City". In his book from 2015 They All Love Jack: Busting the Ripper Bruce Robinson documents how this suspect frequented the Whitechapel area where the murders took place and investigates a description of a man seen by Matthew Packer on the night of the murder of Elizabeth Stride who resembled Michael Maybrick. The suspect's profession meant he frequently travelled around the UK and the dates and locations of his performances coincide with when and where the letters to the police were sent from. The suspect's presence in Bradford around Christmas 1888 also coincides with the murder of a seven-year-old boy, Johnnie Gill, a murder which the Ripper had foretold to police in a letter.

=== Alexander Pedachenko ===
Alexander Pedachenko (alleged dates 1857–1908) was named in the 1923 memoirs of William Le Queux, Things I Know about Kings, Celebrities and Crooks. Le Queux claimed to have seen a manuscript in French written by Rasputin stating that Jack the Ripper was an insane Russian doctor named Alexander Pedachenko, an agent of the Okhrana (the Secret Police of Imperial Russia), whose aim in committing the murders was to discredit Scotland Yard. He was supposedly assisted by two accomplices: "Levitski" and a tailoress called Winberg. However, there is no hard evidence that Pedachenko ever existed, and many parts of the story as recounted by Le Queux fall apart when examined closely. For example, one of the sources named in the manuscript was a London-based Russian journalist called Nideroest, who was known for inventing sensational stories. Reviewers of Le Queux's book were aware of Nideroest's background, and unabashedly referred to him as an "unscrupulous liar". Pedachenko was promoted as a suspect by Donald McCormick, who may have developed the story by adding his own inventions.

=== Walter Sickert ===
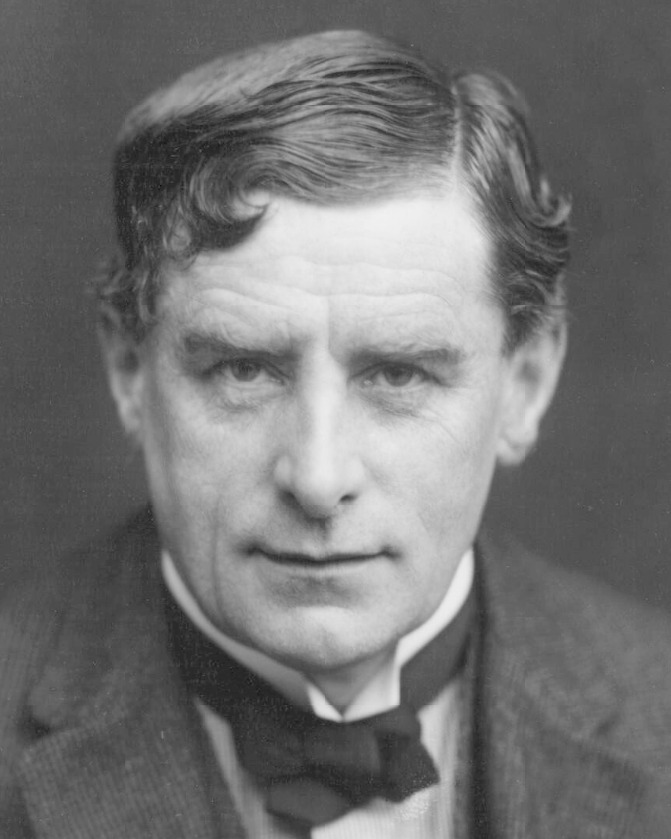
Walter Sickert

Walter Richard Sickert (31 May 1860 – 22 January 1942) was a German-born artist of British and Danish ancestry, who was first mentioned as a possible Ripper suspect in Donald McCormick's book The Identity of Jack the Ripper (1959). Sickert had a fascination with the Ripper murders, going so far as to stay in a room in which Jack the Ripper was rumoured to have once lodged.

In 1976 Stephen Knight, in his book Jack the Ripper: The Final Solution, maintained that Sickert had been forced to become an accomplice in the Ripper murders. Knight's information came from the royal/masonic conspiracy theory concocted by Joseph Gorman, who claimed to be Sickert's illegitimate son. Gorman later admitted that his story was a hoax.

From 1989 to 1998 Alan Moore and Eddie Campbell published the graphic novel From Hell, which was based on Stephen Knight's theory. In 1990 Jean Overton Fuller, in her book Sickert and the Ripper Crimes, maintained that Sickert was the killer.

In 2002 crime novelist Patricia Cornwell, in Portrait of a Killer: Jack the Ripper—Case Closed, maintained that Sickert was Jack the Ripper. Cornwell purchased 31 of Sickert's paintings, and some in the art world have said that she destroyed one of them in searching for Sickert's DNA, but Cornwell denies having done this. Cornwell claimed that mitochondrial DNA from one of more than 600 Ripper letters sent to Scotland Yard and mitochondrial DNA from a letter written by Sickert belong to only one per cent of the population. In 2017, Cornwell published another book on the subject, Ripper: The Secret Life of Walter Sickert, in which she presented what she believes to be further evidence of Sickert's guilt. In 2004 the Oxford Dictionary of National Biography, in its article on Sickert, dismissed any claim that he was Jack the Ripper as "fantasy". In 2005, Matthew Sturgis included a lengthy "Postscript" in his substantial biography of the artist, exploring Cornwell's and others' claims; it begins, "Walter Sickert was not Jack the Ripper". Sickert scholar Richard Shone, reviewing Sturgis's book, refers to "Sturgis's superb demolition of Cornwell" and adds that Sturgis "lays waste the crimewriter's theory with extraordinary conviction." In 2019, an article in Science, the journal of the American Association for the Advancement of Science, stated that Cornwell's allegation that Sickert was the Ripper was based on a DNA analysis of letters that "many experts believe ... to be fake" and that "another genetic analysis of the letters claimed the murderer could have been a woman".

In 2024, Johann Naldi, a French gallery owner, claimed to have confirmed the identity of the serial killer by finding a portrait that he attributes to the French painter Jacques-Émile Blanche which depicts a man that Naldi says resembles Sickert.

Sickert is not considered a serious suspect by most who study the case, and strong evidence shows he was in France at the time of most of the Ripper murders.

=== Joseph Silver ===
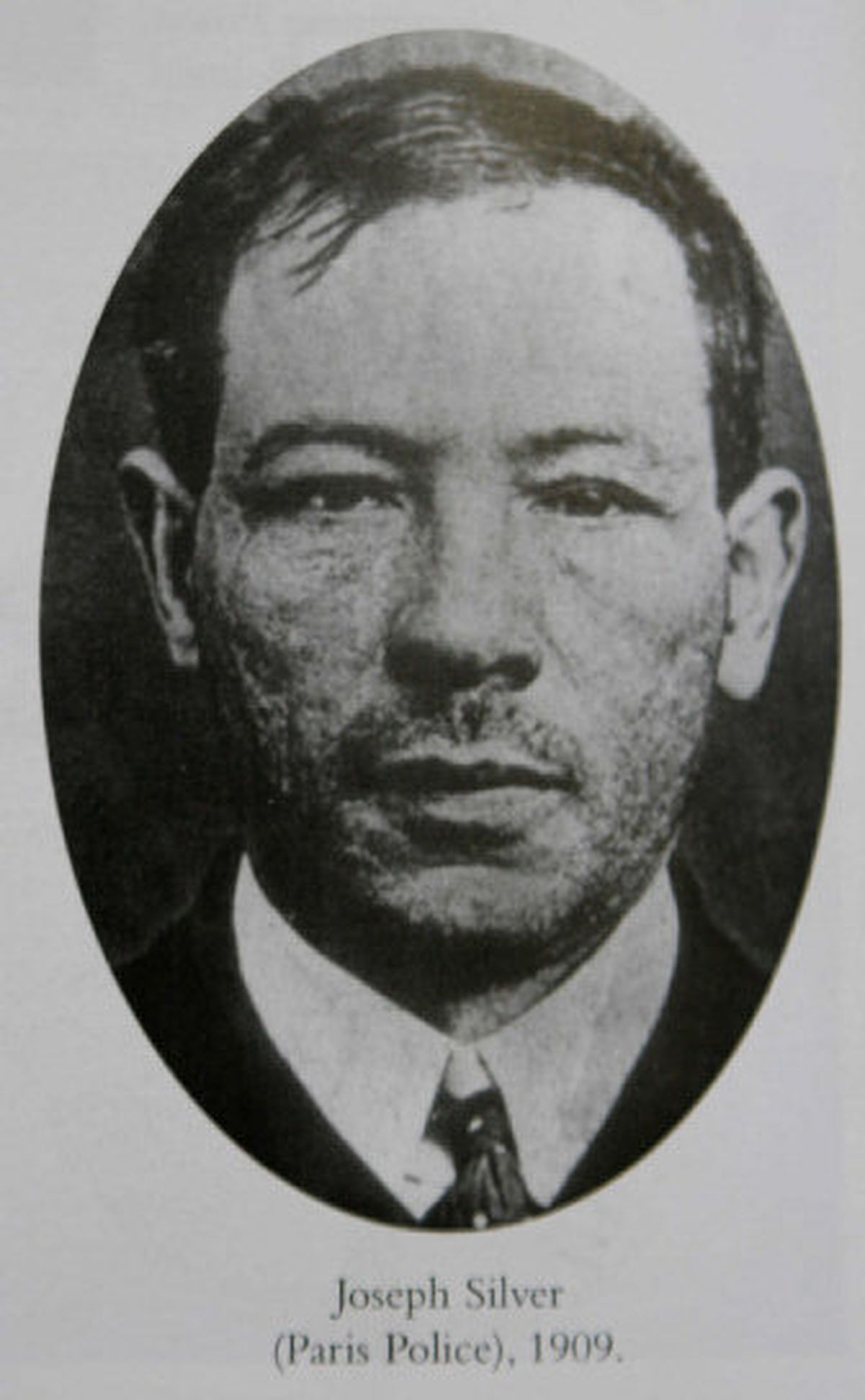
Joseph Silver

South African historian Charles van Onselen claimed, in the book The Fox and the Flies: The World of Joseph Silver, Racketeer and Psychopath (2007), that Joseph Silver (1868–1918), also known as Joseph Lis, a Polish Jew, was Jack the Ripper. Critics note, among other things, that van Onselen provides no evidence that Silver was ever in London during the time of the murders, and that the accusation is based entirely upon speculation. Van Onselen has responded by saying that the number of circumstances involved should make Silver a suspect.

=== James Kenneth Stephen ===
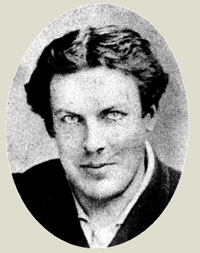
James Kenneth Stephen

James Kenneth Stephen (25 February 1859 – 3 February 1892) was first suggested as a suspect in a biography of another Ripper suspect, Prince Albert Victor, Duke of Clarence and Avondale by Michael Harrison published in 1972. Harrison dismissed the idea that Albert Victor was the Ripper but instead suggested that Stephen, a poet and one of Albert Victor's tutors from Trinity College, Cambridge, was a more likely suspect. Harrison's suggestion was based on Stephen's misogynistic writings and on similarities between his handwriting and that of the "From Hell" letter, supposedly written by the Ripper. Harrison supposed that Stephen may have had sexual feelings for Albert Victor and that Stephen's hatred of women arose from jealousy because Albert Victor preferred female company and did not reciprocate Stephen's feelings. However, Harrison's analysis was rebutted by professional document examiners. There is no proof that Stephen was ever in love with Albert Victor, although he did commit suicide by starvation shortly after hearing of Albert's death.

Frank Spiering further developed the theory in his book Prince Jack (1978), which depicted Albert Victor as the murderer and Stephen as his lover. The book is widely dismissed as sensational fiction based on previous theories rather than genuine historical research. Spiering claimed to have discovered a copy of some private notes written by another suspect, Sir William Gull, in the library of the New York Academy of Medicine and that the notes included a confession by Albert Victor under a state of hypnosis. Spiering further suggested that Albert Victor died due to an overdose of morphine, administered to him on the order of Prime Minister Lord Salisbury and possibly Albert Victor's own father, Edward VII of the United Kingdom. The New York Academy of Medicine denies possessing the records Spiering mentioned, and when Spiering was offered access to the Royal Archives, he retorted: "I don't want to see any files."

=== Francis Thompson ===
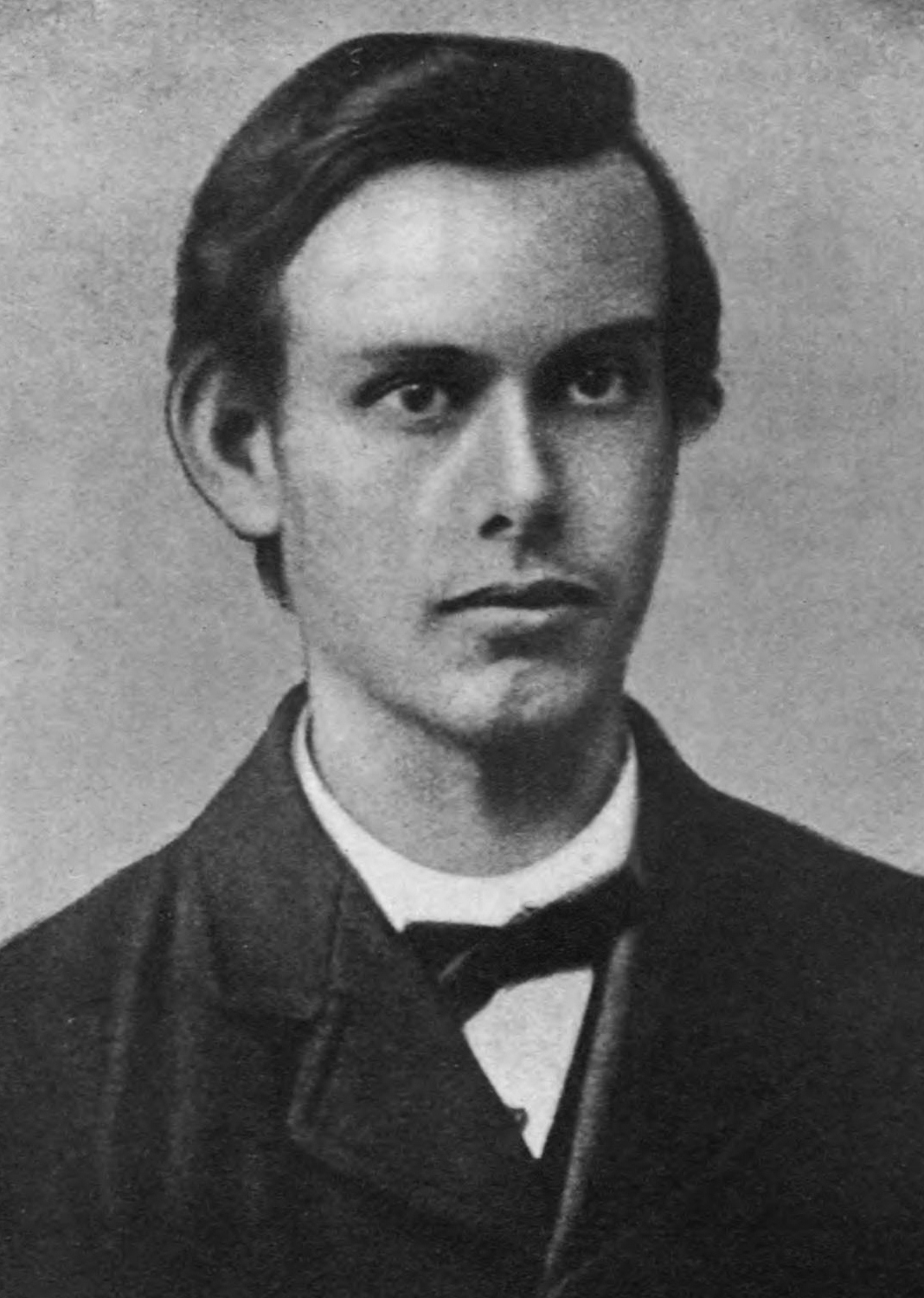
Francis Thompson

Francis Thompson (18 December 1859 – 13 November 1907) was an ascetic poet and opium addict with some medical training. Between 1885 and 1888, he spent some time homeless in the Docks area south of Whitechapel. He was proposed as a suspect in the self-published 2016 book Francis Thompson: A Ripper Suspect by Australian teacher Richard Patterson, who cites interpretations of his poetry.

=== Sir John Williams ===
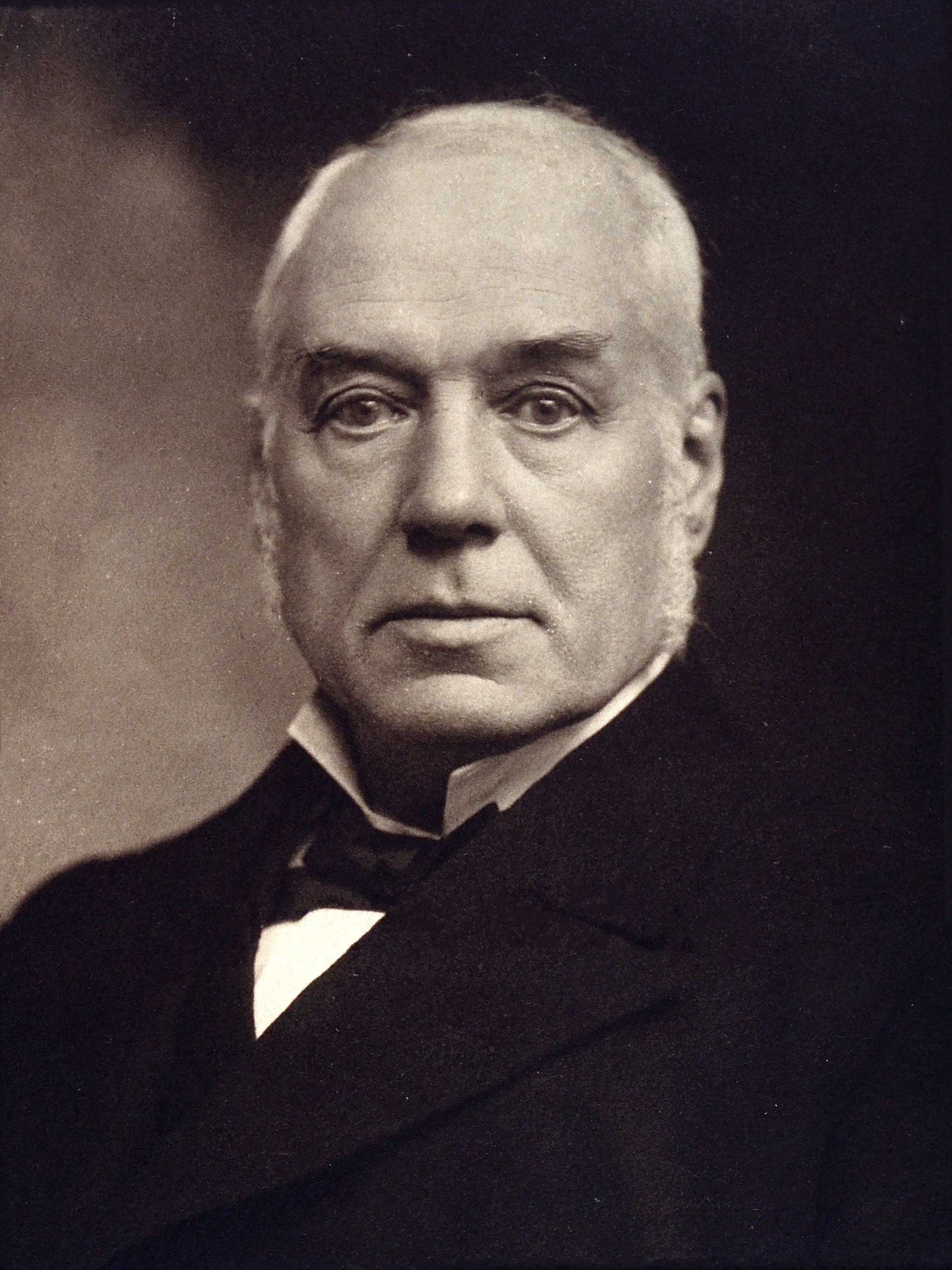
Sir John Williams

Sir John Williams, 1st Baronet (6 November 1840 – 24 May 1926) was obstetrician to Queen Victoria's daughter Princess Beatrice, and was accused of the Ripper crimes in the book, Uncle Jack (2005), written by one of the surgeon's descendants, Tony Williams, and Humphrey Price. The authors claim that the victims knew the doctor personally, that they were killed and mutilated in an attempt to research the causes of infertility, and that a badly blunted surgical knife, which belonged to Williams, was the murder weapon. Jennifer Pegg demonstrated in two articles that much of the research in the book was flawed; for example, the version of the notebook entry used to argue that Williams had met Ripper victim Mary Ann Nichols had been altered for print and did not match the original document, and the line as found in the original document was in handwriting that did not match the rest of the notebook.

Williams's wife, Lizzie, was named as a possible suspect by author John Morris, who claims that she was unable to have children and, in an unhinged state, took revenge on those who could by killing them.

== Further theories ==
Other named suspects include German hairdresser Charles Ludwig, apothecary and mental patient Oswald Puckridge (1838–1900), insane medical student John Sanders (1862–1901), Swedish tramp Nikaner Benelius, and even social reformer Thomas Barnardo, who claimed he had met one of the victims (Elizabeth Stride) shortly before her murder. Isenschmid and Ludwig were exonerated after another murder was committed while they were in custody. There was no evidence against Barnardo, Benelius, Puckridge or Sanders. According to Donald McCormick, other suspects included mountebank L. Forbes Winslow, whose own suspect in the case was a religious maniac, G. Wentworth Bell Smith. The theories continue, such as the 2009 addition of morgue assistant Robert Mann to the long list of suspects. More outlandish theories have included artist Vincent van Gogh and Leopold II of Belgium.

Named suspects who may be entirely fictional include "Dr Stanley", cult leader Nicolai Vasiliev, Norwegian sailor "Fogelma", and Russian needlewoman Olga Tchkersoff, as well as the aforementioned Alexander Pedachenko.

Sir Arthur Conan Doyle advanced theories involving a female murderer dubbed "Jill the Ripper". Supporters of this theory believe that the murderer worked, or at least posed, as a midwife, who could be seen with bloody clothes without attracting suspicion and would be more easily trusted by the victims than a man. Women proposed as the Ripper include the convicted murderers Mary Pearcey and Constance Kent, and even Theosophist Helena Blavatsky. The 19 December 1893 edition of the Ohio Marion Daily Star reported that Lizzie Halliday, a mentally ill Irish immigrant suspected of leaving a string of dead husbands in her wake before being arrested in upper New York State for the murder of two women and her last husband, was likewise accused of the Whitechapel murders, of which she spoke "constantly". She denied any relation to them, however, and there was no evidence to contradict her claim.

Some Ripper authors, such as Patricia Cornwell, believe the killer sent letters to the police and press. DNA analysis of the gum used on a postage stamp of one of these letters was "inconclusive" and "not forensically reliable". The available material has been handled many times and is therefore far too contaminated to provide any meaningful results. Moreover, most authorities consider the letters hoaxes. Nevertheless, Jeff Mudgett, himself a descendant of notorious American serial killer H. H. Holmes, used these handwriting samples in an attempt to link Holmes to the Ripper case. The H. H. Holmes theory is the basis for an eight-part cable TV series titled American Ripper, which premiered on the History Channel on 11 July 2017.

Author Frank Pearse, who purports to have access to a written confession, argues that the murders were performed by a man named John Pavitt Sawyer (who held multiple similarities, such as residence and profession, to alternate suspect George Chapman), as part of an occult Freemason initiation.

Several theorists suggest that "Jack the Ripper" was actually more than one killer. Stephen Knight argued that the murders were a conspiracy involving multiple miscreants, whereas others have proposed that each murder was committed by unconnected individuals acting independently of each other.

The police of the time believed the Ripper was a local Whitechapel resident. His apparent ability to disappear immediately after the killings suggests an intimate knowledge of the Whitechapel neighbourhood, including its back alleys and hiding places. However, the population of Whitechapel was largely transient, impoverished and often used aliases. There is hardly any record of the lives of its residents.

In 2023, historian Rod Beattie proposed police officer Bowden Endacott, who had previously been demoted and reassigned to guarding the British Museum after falsely accusing a woman named Elizabeth Cass of being a prostitute.
