= Jack the Ripper, Light-Hearted Friend =

1996 true crime book by Richard Wallace

- First edition
- Author: Richard Wallace
- Language: English
- Genre: Non-fiction
- Publisher: Gemini Press
- Publication date: 1996

Jack the Ripper, Light-Hearted Friend is a 1996 book by Richard Wallace in which Wallace proposed a theory that British author Lewis Carroll, whose real name was Charles L. Dodgson (1832–1898), and his colleague Thomas Vere Bayne (1829–1908) were responsible for the Jack the Ripper murders.

This theory was based primarily on a number of anagrams derived from passages in two of Carroll's works, The Nursery "Alice", an adaptation of Alice's Adventures in Wonderland for younger readers, and from the first volume of Sylvie and Bruno. Carroll first published both works in 1889 and was probably still working on them during the period of the Ripper murders. Wallace claimed that the books contained hidden but detailed descriptions of the murders. This theory gained enough attention to make Carroll a late but notable addition to the list of suspects, although one that is generally not taken very seriously by experts.

== Criticisms ==
Carroll's recent biographers and Ripperologists have argued that this theory has some very serious flaws. One of the most vocal critics was Karoline Leach, who in a lecture about Wallace's theory gave three main arguments against it:

- The same method of anagrams can be applied to any number of works written in the Latin alphabet and using the English language without proving any intention by the original author. Leach demonstrated her point by reworking passages of A. A. Milne's Winnie-the-Pooh to indicate that Milne had also committed murder.
- From August 31 through September 30, 1888, when Mary Ann Nichols, Annie Chapman, Elizabeth Stride and Catherine Eddowes were killed, Carroll was vacationing in Eastbourne, East Sussex along with Isa Bowman, a child actress and personal friend of his. Meanwhile, Thomas Vere Bayne had severe back pain during the summer of 1888 and was barely able to move. On November 9, 1888, when Mary Jane Kelly was killed, both Carroll and Bayne were reportedly in Oxford.
- An August 26, 1891 passage of Carroll's diary reports that he spoke that day with Dr. Dabbs, an acquaintance of his, about "his very ingenious theory about 'Jack the Ripper'". Although the theory he refers to is unknown, the passage does not indicate that Carroll was personally involved in the murders, as many people throughout England were intensely interested in the case and followed its details closely due to the publicity given to them by the newspapers.

Similarly, anagram aficionados Francis Heaney and Guy Jacobson pointed out that similarly incriminating anagrams could be derived from Wallace's own book. When Harper's Magazine excerpted Jack the Ripper, Light-Hearted Friend, Heaney and Jacobson wrote in response that its first three sentences:

This is my story of Jack the Ripper, the man behind Britain's worst unsolved murders. It is a story that points to the unlikeliest of suspects: a man who wrote children's stories. That man is Charles Dodgson, better known as Lewis Carroll, author of such beloved books as Alice in Wonderland.

are an anagram of:

The truth is this: I, Richard Wallace, stabbed and killed a muted Nicole Brown in cold blood, severing her throat with my trusty shiv's strokes. I set up Orenthal James Simpson, who is utterly innocent of this murder. P.S. I also wrote Shakespeare's sonnets, and a lot of Francis Bacon's works too.

Carroll has been voted by the staff and readers of Casebook: Jack the Ripper as the least likely suspect (out of 22 names featured) to have actually been Jack the Ripper.
