= New York Ripper murders =

1915 murders of two children

Jack the Ripper
- Other name: H.B RICHMOND
- Years active: 1915
- Reward amount: $2,000

Details
- Victims: 2
- Country: United States
- State: New York
- Target: Children
- Weapon: Knife
- Date apprehended: N/A

The New York Ripper murders refer to the murders of two children on the East Side of Manhattan in New York City between March and May 1915. Both victims, a boy and a girl, were stabbed to death in the hallways of tenements. Letters signed "Jack the Ripper" were sent to the mothers of the victims, boasting that the perpetrator would never be caught and threatening to murder more children. Despite numerous suspects being arrested in connection to the crimes, all were eventually cleared and the murders remain unsolved.

== Murders ==
=== Leonore Cohn ===
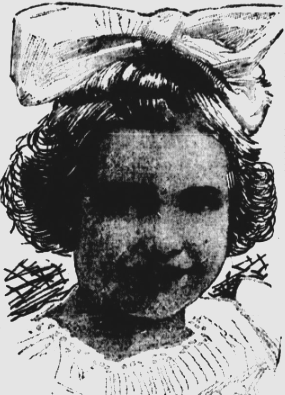
Leonore Cohn

On the evening of March 19, 1915, at about 7:30 p.m., Anna Cohn sent her daughter, five-year-old Leonore, to purchase a pail of milk. Ten minutes later, as she was walking back up the stairs to her family's apartment, Leonore was choked unconscious, stabbed multiple times with a keen-edged knife and mutilated. At 7:45 p.m., Leonore's neighbor, Augusta Johnson, found her after she heard whimpering outside her door. Leonore was still alive when she was found, but died soon after an ambulance surgeon arrived at the residence.

Investigators noticed that Leonore had clutched a clump of gray hair in her left hand before her death. They also noticed bruise marks on her neck which indicated that the perpetrator had a large hand. As police searched the tenement, they discovered blood droplets on two steps of another staircase, on the opposite side of the building, but they were unable to determine if this was related to the case. Additionally, fingerprints were found on Leonore's face and throat as well as on the pail of milk she was carrying. Investigators also found a piece of lemon drop candy on her body that had been wet, meaning she had been eating it. However, there were no stores in Leonore's neighborhood that sold that type of candy. Twenty detectives were assigned to work on the case, and the police kept close watch on the neighborhood in the days following the murder.

=== Charles Murray ===
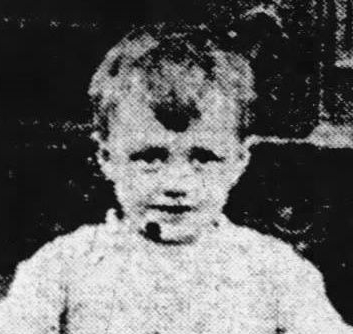
Charles Murray

On May 3, 1915, four-year-old Charles Murray was strangled, stabbed to death, mutilated and disemboweled beneath a dimly-lit staircase in his family's tenement at 270 First Avenue. After Charles' family members could not find him at 7:30 p.m., they discovered his body upon conducting a search. Charles was last seen alive playing behind the tenement earlier in the day. His sister claimed to have seen a "strange" man hurry out of the building shortly before the body was discovered, but police later dismissed this as a product of her imagination. The crime was quickly linked to the murder of Leonore Cohn. After the murder, eighty more homicide detectives were assigned to the two cases, bringing the total to one-hundred.

Moments before Charles' murder, a six-year-old girl had been attacked five doors up the street. As the girl played outside of a bakery – waiting for her aunt – she was approached by a well-dressed man with a mustache and black derby hat. When she refused to talk to the man, he grabbed her arm and forced her through an open doorway. When neighbors arrived in response to the girl's screams, the assailant fled before the girl was harmed.

== Letters ==
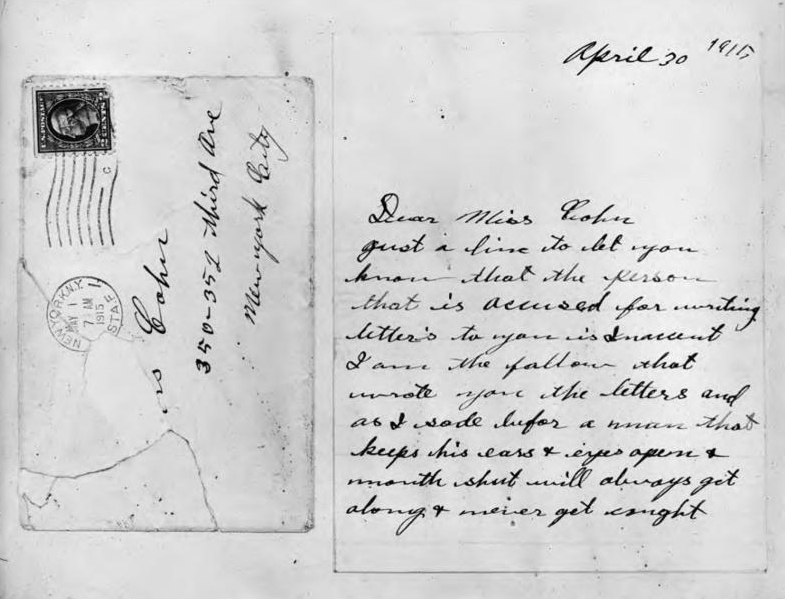
First letter

Soon after Leonore's murder, her mother began receiving letters from an individual claiming to be the perpetrator. These letters were signed "Jack-the-ripper," presumably referencing the serial killer of that name. The letters were given to police, who handed them to federal postal inspectors. On April 29, 27-year-old Edward Richman was arrested in connection to the letters, but soon cleared of actual involvement in the murders. One day after Richman was arrested, another letter was mailed to Cohn's mother. It read:

Dear Mrs. Cohn: Just a line to let you know that the person that is accused of writing letters to you is innocent. I am the fellow that wrote you the letters, and as I said before a man that keeps his ears open and mouth shut will always get along and never get caught. Some day thats if I get the chair I may confess. But as long as I am out they can never get me. Kindly give the enclosed letter to the police and tell them I wrote it.

— H.B RICHMOND, Jack-the-ripper

Inside the first envelope, there was a second envelope labeled, "Give this to the police." Inside the envelope was another letter that read:

Why don't you drop this case? You know that man can't get me in 100 years from now so its no youse in sirchen for me. I am a wise guy you know but wise guys never get caught. You may think that I am a fool to write you But I am writing just to show that I aint afraid. Mr.Richmond [sic] is innocent of the letter which you accuse him of writing to Mrs. Cohn. I am the one that wrote all of them. As I told you in one of my letters that is going to be the biggest murders to be committed in N.Y. that was ever known. Now do you see I am true.

— H.B RICHMOND, JACK-THE-RIPPER

At first, investigators suspected that Richman sent the letters to divert suspicion away from him, naming visitors who called him in jail as potential accomplices, but no evidence was ever found linking him to the final letters. Fingerprints were also found on the letters, but they were too blurred to be useful to those examining them.

Another letter was sent to Charles Murray's mother. As she read it in her kitchen next to her friends, she collapsed in her chair. The note read:

DEAR MRS. MURRAY: I really feel sorry for you. I sit in my room here in this neighborhood and watch this crowd of police looking for me. But when the excitement cools off again some evening after dinner I am going out to kill again. While I feel sorry for you, you must understand that I must see blood and cut flesh. The police can never get me.

— R.F.C

The letter was examined, and inspectors found that it had been written with a lead pencil as opposed to the previous letters, which were written in ink. The handwriting on the envelope was also larger than on the letters to Leonore Cohn's mother.

== Hysteria ==
The murders triggered mass hysteria in New York City and the tri-state area. Locals frequently chased, beat and threatened to lynch people they thought were the perpetrator. Others wrote copycat letters claiming to be the perpetrator.

On May 7, 1915, a twelve-year-old boy was stabbed in the thigh. As the child screamed, men and women ran out into the street, shouting, "He's a Ripper!" and chased the man accused of attacking him. The man had to be rescued by a police officer, who kept him detained in a drugstore until a patrol car arrived. The following day, fifty people attacked a man after two boys accused him of acting suspiciously. The man was rescued by the police. On May 17, a patrolman was arrested for beating his wife and child. Rumors soon spread that a "Ripper" was in custody, causing 1,000 outraged locals to gather outside of the police station.

On May 9, two housewives found notes written in pencil on their doormats. The notes threatened that their children would be kidnapped and murdered the following day. Investigators traced the notes to two girls, who wrote them for fun. On May 12, another note from a person claiming to be the Ripper was traced to an eighteen-year-old woman, who wrote the note to her employer out of spite.

In Newark, one-hundred students of the Lafayette Street School chased a stranger loitering on school grounds for a mile until he was detained by a police officer. Two other people were also detained in Newark on suspicion of being the Ripper that day. All three suspects were cleared.
