= List of cases of factitious disorder imposed on another =

Factitious disorder imposed on another (FDIA), also known as fabricated or induced illness by carers (FII), medical child abuse and originally named Munchausen syndrome by proxy (MSbP) after Munchausen syndrome, is a mental health disorder in which a caregiver creates the appearance of health problems in another person – typically their child, and sometimes (rarely) when an adult falsely simulates an illness or health issues in another adult partner. This may include injuring the proxy or altering test samples. The caregiver then presents the proxy as being sick or injured. Permanent injury or death of the proxy may occur as a result of the disorder. Although the caregiver typically does not benefit from their own behaviour, there are notable cases where the caregiver defrauds charities, insurance companies or local friends and family under the guise of using the resources received for the aid of the proxy.

== Origin of name ==
The name is derived from Munchausen syndrome, which in turn derives from the famous liar in literature, Baron Munchausen; the character was in turn derived from the historical Hieronymus Karl Friedrich, Freiherr von Münchhausen.

== Notable victims ==
- Jennifer Bush: used in a large-scale fraud involving political elites who saw the girl's case as an example of the need for medical reform; mother Kathy Bush was later discovered to have caused Jennifer's symptoms in a case of Munchausen by proxy.
- Olivia Gant: died from the removal of her feeding tubes after years of medical abuse by her mother, Kelly Renee Turner-Gant; Turner-Gant was convicted in 2022.
- Julie Gregory: childhood victim of her mother's Munchausen by proxy, which she survived and later documented in her memoir, Sickened: The Memoir of a Munchausen by Proxy Childhood.
- Hannah Milbrandt: a girl who was convinced that she suffered from terminal cancer by her parents in a situation of Munchausen by proxy, using community donations in a widescale act of fraud. This is one of the first contested Munchausen by proxy cases, causing a debate about whether it was a situation of true Munchausen or just medical fraud.
- Garnett Spears: killed due to brain swelling induced by repeated salt poisoning by mother Lacey Spears, who was later convicted of murder.
- Eminem: American rapper who has spoken in songs about his mother frequently taking him to doctors and hospitals for tests. He mentions being a victim of the illness in his song "Cleanin' Out My Closet": "going through public housing systems, victim of Munchausen syndrome. My whole life I was made to believe I was sick when I wasn't until I grew up and blew up." He also received custody of his younger brother due to his mother's battle with the illness.
- Megan Bhari: Bhari's mother, Jean, claimed her daughter had idiopathic intracranial hypertension. The pair subsequently started a charity, Believe in Magic that garnered thousands of dollars in revenue and the support of several celebrities, most notably boy band One Direction. Bhari died at the age of 23 in 2018 from acute cardiac arrhythmia. An autopsy found that her brain was morphologically normal and had no tumours, despite what Jean claimed. A report by the BBC suggested that Bhari was victim of Munchausen by proxy, a claim supported by academic Marc Feldman and Kingston Council.

== Notable perpetrators ==
- Beverley Allitt: British serial killer with Munchausen by proxy, who purposely sickened and killed a number of minor children.
- Ameh Bozorg in the memoir Not Without My Daughter is not only convinced that she is suffering from some sort of chronic illness, but she also convinces her adult brother, a medical doctor, that he will become ill himself if he bathes because he will "wash all the cells off his skin" and leave himself open to pathogens. Her brother, a trained medical doctor, initially finds this silly, but as the memoir progresses, he begins to follow his older sister's bizarre regimen of not bathing or following healthcare standards. Notably the book does not suggest whether this is true Munchausen by proxy or behaviour based on anti-western sentiment.
- Wendi Michelle Scott: mother charged with child abuse after purposely sickening her four-year-old daughter.
- Shauna Dee Taylor, a Floridian woman who medically abused all 10 of her children, with a specific fascination with their internal organs; she poisoned her infant daughter in a 2013 incident and caused the child to suffer liver damage, setting up a sympathy donation fundraiser page online for the child.
- Marybeth Roe Tinning, an American murderer and suspected serial killer who was convicted in New York State of the murder of her ninth child, 4-month-old daughter Tami Lynne, on December 20, 1985. She is suspected to be similarly involved in the previous deaths of her eight children, all of which took place within the span of fourteen years.
- Ellen Rupp-Jones, a nurse from Palestine, Texas, pled guilty on June 27, 2023, to charges of injury to a child, exploitation of a child and aggravated assault. Rupp-Jones injected her then seven-year-old daughter with insulin and glucagon in order to feign diabetes. Rupp-Jones appeared twice on local news programs to solicit fundraising donations and a “Diabetic Alert Dog” for her daughter. She received an eight-year deferred adjudication sentence, 59 days in jail, 300 hours community service, court costs, restitution to the family of the service dog, and an order of protection from her daughter until the latter turns 21.
- Cynthia Abcug, a Denver, Colorado, mother who was convicted on August 26th, 2022 of misdemeanor child abuse and conspiracy to commit kidnapping after plotting with Q-Anon members online to enact a raid on the foster home of her then 7-year-old son. He was removed from her custody due to accusations that she lied about him having seizures, a heart condition, brain tumors, and other health issues in order to trick doctors into providing unnecessary treatments. Her son is still in foster care and has not had any major health issues since removal from her custody.

== Alleged perpetrators ==
- Dee Dee Blanchard: Dee Dee faked multiple chronic illnesses of her daughter, Gypsy-Rose Blanchard, both for sympathy and charitable benefits. Her abuse of Gypsy-Rose led to the girl eventually aiding a secret boyfriend in the murder of Dee Dee, after which the abuse was finally discovered. Gypsy-Rose's experience has been dramatized in movies and TV shows.

== Fictional examples ==
- Marie-Louise Norén, in the Swedish-Danish television series The Bridge (Bron/Broen) is revealed to have Munchausen syndrome by proxy. Marie-Louise deliberately made her daughter Jennifer ill by administering medication, creating the appearance of illness. Saga Norén, Jennifer's older sister, had spent years believing that her mother was responsible for Jennifer's unexplained illnesses. The truth is eventually established during the fourth and final season, when Saga investigates her mother's records and, with the assistance of a pathologist, proves that Marie-Louise had been dosing Jennifer. Jennifer subsequently died by suicide as a teenager, and Saga had long carried guilt over her sister's death. The revelation that Jennifer's illness had resulted from her mother's medical abuse resolves a central mystery underlying Saga's personal history and police career.Hendy, David (29 June 2018). "The Bridge recap: season four, episode eight – an emotional goodbye to Saga". The Guardian.
- Boh, an obese infant child in the Japanese 2001 animated feature film Spirited Away, is kept in a padded room by his mother and convinced that he is too sickly to go outside, led by his mother to believe that he will catch germs if he wanders from the room. He later relents and leaves the room, thus meeting new friends and helping to save the life of his mother's gravely injured apprentice.
- Cheryl, a parent in the 2013 Lifetime movie The Good Mother (played by Helen Slater) poisons her teenage daughter to death with ricin, then moves on to her next daughter, while basking in the constant sympathy she receives as a grieving mother with terminally ill children. She tells people that the unnamed "illness" is a genetic condition of sorts, poisoning the daughters until a family friend discovers the abuse and tries to report it.
- Kyra Collins, a young girl in The Sixth Sense (played by Mischa Barton), is made to appear ill by her mother (Angelica Page), who gives her symptoms of an illness by poisoning her food. Kyra later dies from the repeated poisoning. Her mother's crimes are later revealed by a VHS tape showing Mrs. Collins mixing Pine Sol into Kyra's food.
- Colin Craven in various adaptations of The Secret Garden by Frances Hodgson Burnett, most notably the 1993 feature film of the same name, is kept in a single room for most of his life, convinced by his father and the head servant that he is crippled, unable to walk, and too sickly to survive in the outdoor air. His cousin Mary befriends him and takes him outside to the garden, proving to him that he is perfectly well.
- Adora Crellin in the miniseries Sharp Objects poisons her daughter Marian, in a case of Munchausen by proxy that goes unsolved until a later investigation.
- Natalie Drax from The 9th Life of Louis Drax causes several injuries to her son, Louis, during his lifetime due to her Munchausen by proxy condition.
- Edward "Eddie" Kaspbrak from the Stephen King novel It developed hypochondriac behaviours after a childhood living with his single mother in a situation of Munchausen by proxy.
- Dorothy Mann from Monkey Shines: Dorothy is annoyed when her quadriplegic son shows signs that he might be able to recover and live a normal life, including the possibility that he might move again and that he can have a romantic relationship. She sells her own house, moves in with him, lies to him and tells him that he is incapable, and attempts to cut off any female relationships he has. The original novel did not feature these elements quite so heavily.
- Mandy Phillips from Fragile: British girl with osteogenesis imperfecta, a condition purposely worsened by obsessed nurse Charlotte when she notices the girl's bones beginning to heal.
- Chloe Sherman, a young woman in Run (2020), played by Kiera Allen, is raised by her mother (Sarah Paulson) who treats her real and imagined ailments.
- Esme Stoller from Love You to Death: a fictional cosplay fan and victim of her mother's Munchausen by proxy, told that she has cancer and developmental delays; Esme is loosely based on real-life victim Gypsy-Rose Blanchard.
- Pauline Whittier from Everything, Everything treats her daughter Maddy for the immune disorder SCID. A doctor later reveals that she never had the disease, just an underdeveloped immune system due to lack of exposure.
- In the film Repo! The Genetic Opera, the main character Shilo is raised with the belief (presented to the viewer as factual) that she can never go outside or leave her home due to the effects of a rare, unspecified blood disease that also killed her mother Marni. It is revealed that in fact, there never was a blood disease: Marni was murdered by her ex-lover, and Shilo's father has been poisoning her to keep her contained in their home and "safe" from the outside world and knowledge of his true career.
- In the light novel series Ameku M.D., a nurse gives her child an overdose of Vitamin A in order to seem like she's caring too much for him, and later switches out the contents of his juice boxes for grapefruit juice in order to cause a drug interaction with his anti-epileptic medications.
