= Wendi Michelle Scott =

American with Munchausen syndrome by proxy (born 1975)

Wendi Michelle Scott (born March 3, 1975) is a Frederick, Maryland mother of two who was charged on November 16, 2007, with sickening her four-year-old daughter in a case of Münchausen syndrome by proxy.

Scott was charged with first- and second-degree child abuse, first- and second-degree assault, and reckless endangerment. She was ordered to be held in jail on $75,000 bail. Frederick County Assistant State's Attorney Lindell K. Angel had urged Circuit Court Judge G. Edward Dwyer to set Scott's bail at $250,000, calling her a danger to herself and others. Defense attorney Mary Drawbaugh had asked for a lower bail, stating that Scott turned herself in and kept her weekly psychiatric appointments.

== Munchausen syndrome evidenced by Scott in the past ==
According to court statements, Scott previously feigned cancer for about a year between 2002 and 2003 by shaving her head and eyebrows and plucking her eyelashes. She used a wheelchair or walker most of the time, convincing her husband, pastor, and friends that she was seriously ill. While it is unclear if there was a definitive past diagnosis, Angel characterized Scott in the November 16, 2007, hearing as having "a history of Munchausen syndrome."

== Daughter's illness and investigation ==
In the hearing, Assistant State Attorney Angel described how Scott intravenously fed her daughter magnesium and withdrew her blood to make her appear sickly, causing her daughter to suffer severe diarrhea, blood loss, vomiting, high fever, and a rapid heart rate. During this time, her daughter was being treated at Walter Reed Army Medical Center, but doctors there could not find a cause for her symptoms. During three years of inpatient and outpatient treatments at Walter Reed, 72 procedures were performed on the child, including blood transfusions and bone marrow tests because of suspicions of leukemia. Doctors admitted that if not for that suspicion, none of the procedures likely would have been required.

In Scott's May 2008 sentencing trial, Dr. Arthur deLorimier, a lieutenant colonel at Walter Reed, testified that the girl faced increased risks of cancer from repeated radiological tests, was developmentally delayed, and in danger of future emotional problems.

== Online journal ==
While the child was at Walter Reed, Scott posted an online diary documenting the travails of parenting a seriously ill child, Angel said. "The doctors are at a loss," Angel said, reading from the journal. "But we will continue to go on, and through friends, the hospital and everyone's prayers, we'll get through this."

== Trial and sentence ==
Scott entered a guilty plea to first-degree child abuse on March 13, 2008. In the hearing, Scott's defense attorney acknowledged her client intentionally harmed her child during the six-week period from May 1 to June 12, 2007, and conceded that the state could prove Scott committed the most serious of those acts during this time period.

Judge Dwyer, again presiding, accepted Scott's plea and convicted her of abuse from May 1 to June 12, 2007. As part of the plea agreement, fourteen other charges against Scott were dropped, including allegations of assault and reckless endangerment. Dwyer ordered Scott to remain on home detention while awaiting trial and prohibited her from contacting her children or entering Fort Detrick.

In a six-hour sentencing hearing on May 8, 2008, defense attorney Drawbaugh urged Dwyer to confine Scott to her home, allowing her to continue intensive psychotherapy to deal with severe mental illnesses. However, after hearing prosecution testimony as well, Judge Dwyer ordered Scott to serve 15 years of a 25-year sentence.

== See also ==
- Beverley Allitt, English serial child killer
- David Southall, British paediatrician
- Murder of Dee Dee Blanchard, the 2015 killing of a Missouri woman by her daughter, Gypsy Rose Blanchard, whom she had made pretend to be seriously ill.
- Murder of Garnett Spears, the 2014 killing of a New York boy whose mother also had Munchausen by proxy.
- Shauna Taylor case involved the purposeful destruction of a child's liver by poisoning; the child survived.
