= Meadow's syndrome =

Meadow's syndrome or Meadows syndrome can refer to:

- Münchausen syndrome by proxy, named for Roy Meadow, who characterized it in 1977
- Postpartum cardiomyopathy, named for William Meadows, who characterized it in 1957
