= Angel of mercy (criminology) =

Type of criminal offender

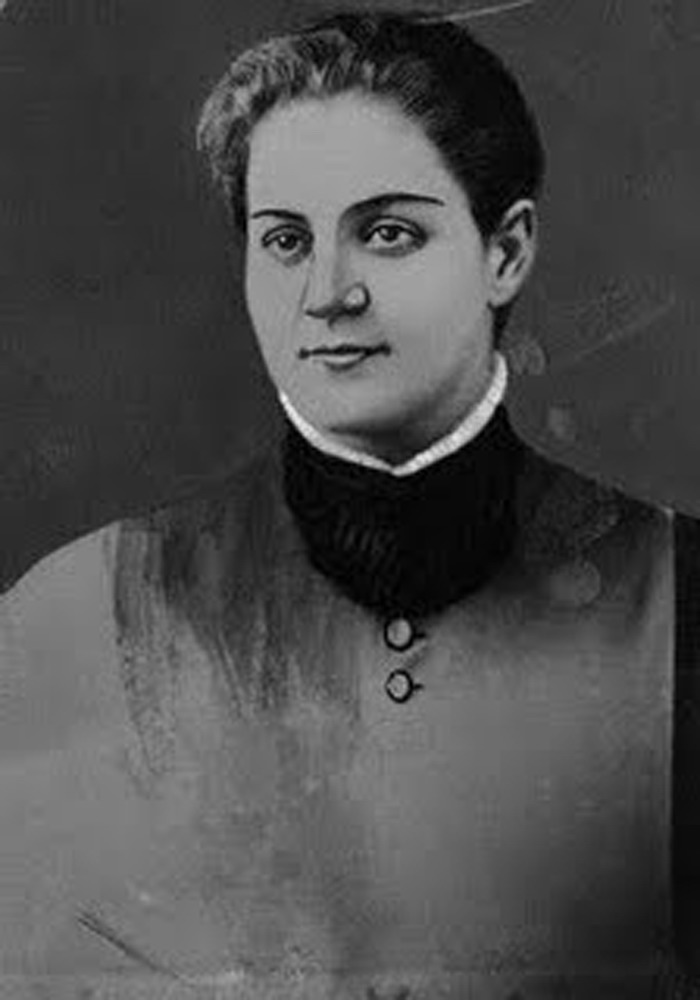
Serial killer Jane Toppan, confirmed to have killed at least 12 patients during her time as a nurse.

An angel of mercy or angel of death is a type of criminal offender (often a type of serial killer) who is usually employed as a medical practitioner or a caregiver and intentionally harms or kills people under their care. The angel of mercy is often in a position of power and may decide the victim would be better off if they no longer suffered from whatever severe illness is plaguing them. This person then uses their knowledge to kill the victim. In some cases, as time goes on, this behavior escalates to encompass the healthy and the easily treated.

== Characteristics and motivations ==
The motivation for this type of criminal behaviour is variable, but generally falls into one or more types or patterns:

- Mercy killer: Believes the victims are suffering or beyond help, though this belief may be delusional.
- Sadistic: Use their position as a way of exerting power and control over helpless victims.
- Malignant hero: A pattern wherein the subject endangers the victim's life in some way and then proceeds to "save" them. Some feign attempting resuscitation, all the while knowing their victim is already dead and beyond help, but hope to be seen as selflessly making an effort.

=== In the medical field ===
Some people with a pathological interest in the power of life and death can be attracted to medical or related professions. Killers who occupy the role of a professional career are sometimes referred to as "angels of death" or angels of mercy. In this role they may kill their patients for money, for a sense of sadistic pleasure, for a belief that they are "easing" the patient's pain, or simply "because they can". The typical medical professional who murders kills two patients each month.

One such killer was nurse Jane Toppan, who admitted during her murder trial that she was sexually aroused by death. She would administer a drug mixture to patients she chose as her victims, lie in bed with them and hold them close to her body as they died. Another example is Harold Shipman, an English family doctor, who made it appear that his victims died of natural causes (disease). Between 1975 and 1998, he murdered at least 215 patients; he is suspected of having murdered 250 people and is the only British doctor to be successfully charged with the murder of his patients. This is in contrast to the famous case of Dr. John Bodkin Adams, a British General Practitioner who was placed on trial for murder in 1957, but was acquitted and ultimately only faced convictions for forging prescriptions. After his death, many journalists speculated that he was a serial killer with a number of motives, including mercy killing, and that he may have been responsible for up to 163 deaths.

An example of a malignant hero serial killer was Richard Angelo, who was called the "angel of death", or angel of mercy. Angelo devised a plan where he would inject the patient with drugs, then rush into the room and attempt to "save" the patient so that he could be a hero to the patient's family. This motive of excitement from inducing a health crisis for the patient has recently been labeled as a professional version of Münchausen syndrome by proxy, a type of factitious disorder. Richard Angelo confessed to killing 25 of his patients.

A number of medical murderers were involved in fraud. For example, H. H. Holmes was often involved in insurance scams and confidence tricks. Harold Shipman had a previous conviction for prescription fraud and forgery, for which he was fined £600.

More known "Angels of Death" include:

- Beverley Allitt, English nurse who murdered four child patients.
- Kimberly Clark Saenz, American nurse and convicted serial killer. Saenz was convicted of five murders and attempted five others.
- Lucy Letby, English nurse convicted of the murder of seven babies and the attempted murder of seven more.
- Kristen Gilbert, American nurse and convicted serial killer.
- Donald Harvey, American orderly and convicted serial killer.
- Colin Norris, Scottish nurse convicted of murdering four elderly patients.
- Aino Nykopp-Koski, Finnish nurse convicted of five murders and five attempts of murder.
- Michael Swango, American physician who poisoned over 30 patients and coworkers.
- Niels Högel, German nurse and convicted serial killer.
- Genene Jones, American serial killer
- Efren Saldivar, American respiratory therapist at Adventist Health Glendale in Glendale, California and convicted serial killer.
- Elizabeth Wettlaufer, Canadian nurse who killed 8 patients.
- Charles Cullen, American nurse who is known to have killed over 29 victims

== See also ==
- List of serial killers with health related professions
- Euthanasia
- Abuse during childbirth (including abuse by medical professionals)
