= Functional somatic syndrome =

- Specialty: Psychiatry, psychosomatic medicine, psychoneuroendocrinoimmunology
- Differential diagnosis: Organic/medical illness, primary psychiatric disorders (depression/anxiety with somatic features; psychotic disorders with somatic delusions), functional neurological disorder, somatic symptom disorder, mass psychogenic illness, illness anxiety disorder, Munchausen's and Munchausen's by proxy, deconditioning, malingering
- Treatment: Psychological therapies; Cognitive-behavioural therapy; Psychodynamic Psychotherapy; Psychoeducation; relaxation therapy; Physical therapies; Exercise (sports); Supervised aerobic training; Behavioral activation therapy; Other non-pharmacological interventions
- Medication: Primarily non-pharmacological treatments; SSRIs; SNRIs; Tricyclic Antidepressants; Gabapentinoids (Pregabalin, Gabapentin); Low-dose Antipsychotics

Functional somatic syndrome (FSS) (sometimes termed "non-specific physical disorders") refers to a cluster of chronic conditions, characterized by persistent physical symptoms without demonstrable structural or organic disease despite extensive medical testing.

Contemporary theories describe the aetiology as involving a dysregulation in the brain-body signaling, which includes negative emotional states pathologically activating somatosensory and nociceptive circuits, generating genuine physical sensations through central sensitization, maladaptive stress response systems and learned neuroplastic rewiring, with symptoms resulting from complex interactions between the autonomic nervous system, hypothalamo-pituitary axis and possibly the immune system, rather than from peripheral tissue damage.

Fibromyalgia, chronic fatigue syndrome (now called ME/CFS) and irritable bowel syndrome are some of the most common disorders that have been described as FSS conditions, although the classification of ME/CFS as an FSS has been increasingly called into question in the recent years. Functional somatic syndromes are very common, although specific criteria differ, they are estimated to affect about anywhere from 4% to 16% of the general population.

== Definition and terminology ==
FSS refers to disturbances in bodily functioning where aetiology is unknown. The term 'functional somatic disorders' (FSD) was proposed in 2020.

=== Related terms ===
"Medically unexplained physical symptoms" only include symptoms where no explanation is found at all, but not poorly understood syndromes like fibromyalgia or IBS. These symptoms can sometimes be worsened in the presence of mental health problems.

"Persistent physical symptoms" includes FSS situations but also situations where persistent physical symptoms are caused by a known illness, such as arthritis.

In "somatic symptom disorder" chronic physical symptoms, which may or may not be linked to a known illness, coincide with excessive and maladaptive thoughts, emotions, and behaviors connected to those symptoms. In FSS these features are not present.

== Classification ==
Being an umbrella term, the disorder is not encoded in the ICD-11, rather its separate manifestations have specific codes there. Proposals for classifications have been made.

== Signs and symptoms ==
Functional somatic syndromes are characterized by ambiguous, non-specific symptoms that appear in otherwise-healthy people. Overlap in symptomology exists across diagnoses, including gastrointestinal issues, pain, fatigue, cognitive difficulties, and sleep difficulties. Some have proposed to group symptoms into clusters or into one general functional somatic disorder given the finding of correlations between symptoms and underlying etiologies.

== FSS conditions ==
The following conditions are often considered to be representations of the functional somatic syndrome:

- Myalgic encephalomyelitis/chronic fatigue syndrome
- Fibromyalgia
- Mold allergy
- Temporomandibular disorder
- Irritable bowel syndrome
- Electromagnetic hypersensitivity
- Lower back pain
- Tension headache
- Atypical face pain
- Insomnia
- Long-haul COVID
- Palpitation
- Dyspepsia
- Dizziness
- Unevidenced claims of food allergies
- Gulf War syndrome
- Undemonstrable hypoglycaemia (with symptoms appearing when the blood sugar is normal)
- Chronic Lyme disease
- Multiple chemical sensitivity
- Food intolerance (when not a true allergy)
- Sick building syndrome
- Chronic whiplash

=== Overlap of FSS conditions ===
A considerable overlap of symptoms exists between the FSS diagnoses, with high rates of comorbidity between them. For example, the prevalence of comorbid FSS diagnoses ranges from 20% to 70%, while comorbid affective disorders with a fibromyalgia diagnosis ranges from 20% to 80%.

== Prevalence ==
Studies have found prevalence in the general population of having at least one FSS of 16.3% (n = 9656), and 9.3% (n = 3054).

Some 10% of the general population, and around 33% of adult patients in clinical populations, suffer from functional somatic symptoms.

== Potential causes ==
A mixture of physical and psychological factors may predict FSS.

=== Psychological factors ===
Low-quality evidence suggests that patients with somatic syndromes, such as fibromyalgia and irritable bowel syndrome, tend to have a more frequent history of both physical and sexual abuse prior to the onset of their physiological symptoms. Additionally, patients show higher rates of previous emotional abuse, emotional neglect, and physical neglect when compared to the general population.

Attentional bias has been posited as the psychological mechanism by which trauma and somatic symptoms are tied. Attentional bias refers to the idea that traumatic events can cause individuals to become more attuned to their bodily functions, thus intensifying the perception of pain, fatigue, and other common somatic symptoms. The initial traumatic event is interpreted as a threat to the body, and therefore the stress response of the body takes on a new, heightened awareness to any potential subsequent threats. This attentional bias leads to health anxiety, wherein the patient becomes increasingly concerned that common somatic symptoms are related to a physical disease or injury, and therefore, another potential bodily threat. An initial perception of lost control can further intensify attentional bias; sense of control is negatively associated with symptom reporting, suggesting that somatic symptoms are more closely monitored when psychologically recovering from an incident of lost control. Functional somatic syndromes are thought to be a result of conditioned hyperarousal following a trauma; victims are conditioned to respond more sensitively to the somatic symptoms following a trauma by their attention to and reinforcement of the symptom existence. This feedback loop is similar to that of panic disorder, in which fear of a subsequent panic attack causes an increased hyper-vigilance towards, and exacerbation of, physiological symptoms, such as heart palpitations, dizziness, and breathlessness.

=== Biological factors ===
One hypothesis implicates the hypothalamic–pituitary–adrenal axis (HPA axis) in the manifestation of somatic symptoms following trauma. The HPA axis plays a major role in moderating the body's stress response to both emotional and physical pain, relating to both the experience of psychological symptoms prevalent following trauma as well as the physiological symptoms prevalent in FSS conditions. When an individual experiences a traumatic event, the HPA axis causes the increased release of cortisol, activating the sympathetic nervous system and causing negative feedback to be sent to the hypothalamus and pituitary gland. In people who have experienced major trauma, this reaction can become dysfunctional and can cause a chronic decrease in cortisol production, though the rates of this decrease in cortisol levels vary across different types and frequencies of trauma.

== Diagnosis ==
Diagnosis of a FSS is usually a diagnosis of exclusion, where physicians rule out other disorders that could explain the dysfunctions being experienced. The DDx is often complex and involves factual organic pathology, as well as a number of psychiatric disorders, including somatic delusions, primary mood/anxiety disorders with somatic manifestations, somatic symptom disorder, illness anxiety disorder, functional neurological disorder, factitious disorder, and malingering, as well as primary deconditioning.

== Management and treatment ==
Psychological interventions are considered the primary treatment for functional somatic syndromes, with cognitive behavioral therapy (CBT) representing the most empirically supported approach. Systematic reviews indicate CBT reduces somatic symptom severity and disability through small-to-moderate effect sizes, primarily by modifying maladaptive illness beliefs and reducing avoidance behaviors rather than altering symptom intensity directly. Short-term psychodynamic psychotherapy (STPP) has demonstrated efficacy comparable or superior to CBT in long-term follow-up studies, while third-wave therapies such as mindfulness-based interventions and Acceptance and Commitment Therapy (ACT) target psychological flexibility and experiential avoidance. Psychoeducation regarding the psychophysiological mechanisms of symptoms serves as a foundational component across all modalities, aiming to reframe the patient's understanding of their condition from organic disease to functional dysregulation.

Physical therapies for functional somatic syndromes primarily comprise graded exercise therapy, structured aerobic training, and activity-based rehabilitation programs that aim to reverse deconditioning and reduce symptom-focused inactivity. Graded exercise therapy typically involves individually titrated, stepwise increases in physical activity (e.g., walking, cycling) under supervision, with progression guided by time rather than symptoms to prevent reinforcement of avoidance behavior. Additional components include physiotherapy targeting posture, muscle tension, and pain-modulating movement patterns, as well as occupational therapy interventions that systematically rebuild daily functioning and participation in work and leisure activities. These interventions are predicated on evidence that functional symptoms are maintained by a cycle of inactivity, hypervigilance to bodily sensations, and fear-avoidance, and they therefore emphasize behavioral activation and exposure to normal levels of exertion rather than passive modalities such as rest or purely palliative treatments.

Medications such as antidepressants may play a role. More direct medication has little if any positive long-term impact.

According to guidance from the German Federal Ministry of Health "the extent to which functional somatic syndromes affect people's lives partly depends on how the people affected deal with them."

== History ==
The term functional somatic syndrome was used in a 1999 paper.
