= Johann Bauersachs =

German university teacher

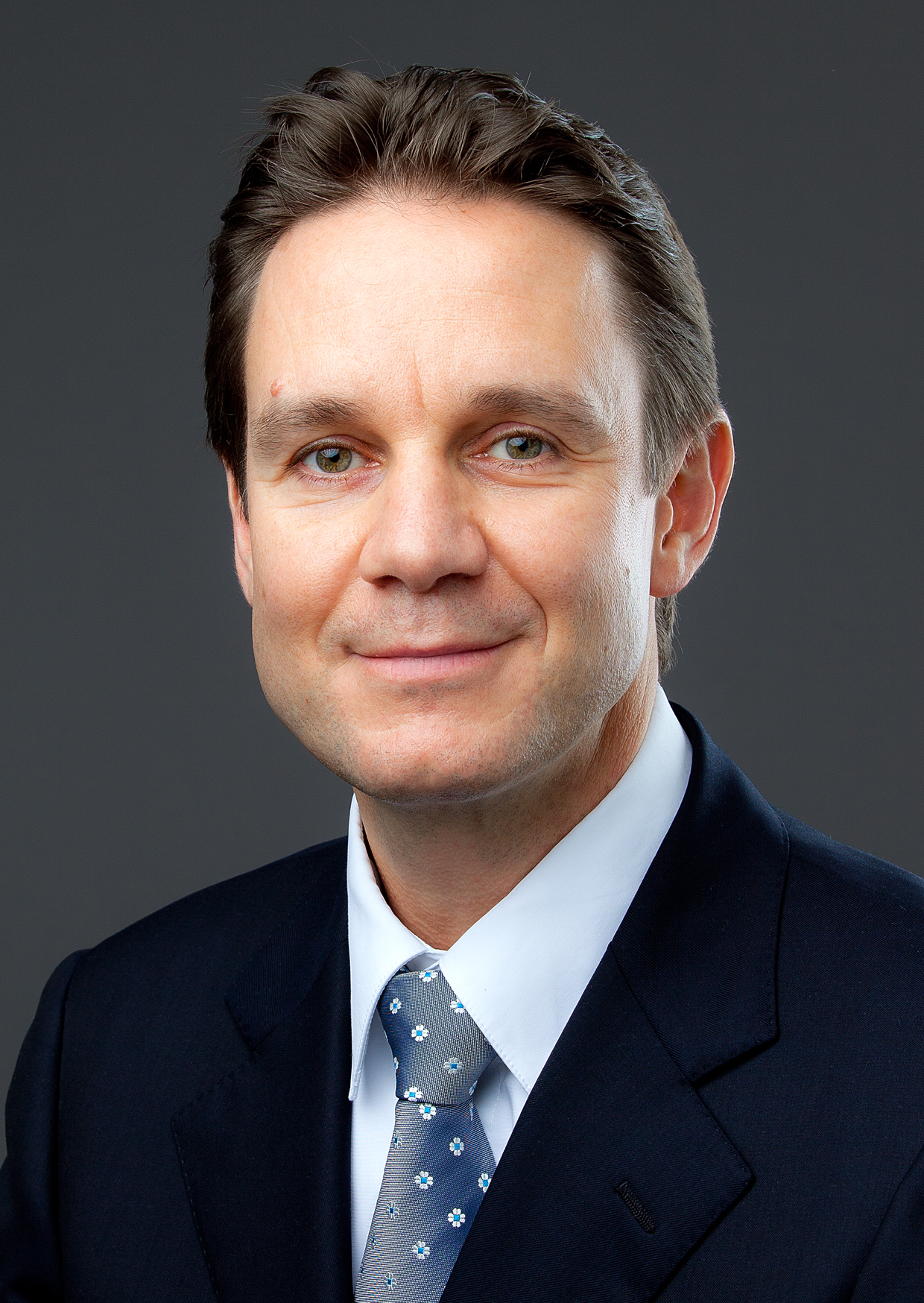
- Born: 22 April 1966 (age 60); Karlsruhe
- Known for: acute coronary syndrome, left ventricular healing and remodeling after ischemia as well as acute and chronic heart failure.
- Scientific career
- Fields: internal medicine, cardiology, intensive care
- Workplaces: Hannover Medical School

Johann Bauersachs is a German internist, cardiologist, and full professor at the Hannover Medical School. He is widely recognized for his scholarly contributions to the domains of acute coronary syndrome, left ventricular repair and remodelling following ischemia, and acute and chronic heart failure.

== Education ==
Bauersachs was born in Karlsruhe on April 22, 1966. He studied medicine at Freiburg University. After completing clinical and research fellowships at the Universities of Frankfurt, Heidelberg/Manheim and Wuerzburg, . He was appointed as consultant and Lecturer in Internal Medicine and Cardiology at the University Hospital Wuerzburg.

== Scientific contributions ==
His research interests include the pathogenesis and therapy of peripartum cardiomyopathy, as well as in the mechanisms mediated by aldosterone and mineralocorticoid receptors and the involvement of non-coding RNAs. Bauersachs is a full professor of cardiology and the head of the department at Hannover Medical School (MHH) in Germany.

- Novel antisense therapy targeting microRNA -132 in patients with heart failure: results of a first-in-human phase 1b randomized, double-blind, placebo-controlled study.
- 2020 ESC Guidelines for the management of acute coronary syndromes in patients presenting without persistent ST-segment elevation.
- Heart failure drug treatment: the fantastic four.

== Memberships & Awards ==
Bauersachs was awarded the Oskar-Lapp Award (2001) and the Albert-Fraenkel-Award (2004) from the German cardiac Society. In 2018, he received the Paul-Morawitz Award from the same society. Also, in the year 2006, he received the Parmley-Award from the American college of cardiology. His additional awards include the Bernard and Joan Marshall Distinguished Investigator Award (2012). He served as a President of ESAC Germany (European Section of Aldosterone Council) Association.

Bauersachs is a Fellow of the American Heart Association, the European Society of Cardiology (ESC), and the European Society of Cardiology's Heart Failure Association (HFA).

== Publications ==
- The struggle towards a Universal Definition of Heart Failure-how to proceed?
- Molecular Imaging Identifies Fibroblast Activation Beyond the Infarct Region After Acute Myocardial Infarction.
- Risk stratification and management of women with cardiomyopathy / heart failure planning pregnancy or presenting during / after pregnancy: a position statement from the Heart Failure Association of the European Society of Cardiology Study Group on Peripartum Cardiomyopathy.
