= Exeter Law Courts =

Judicial building in Exeter, England

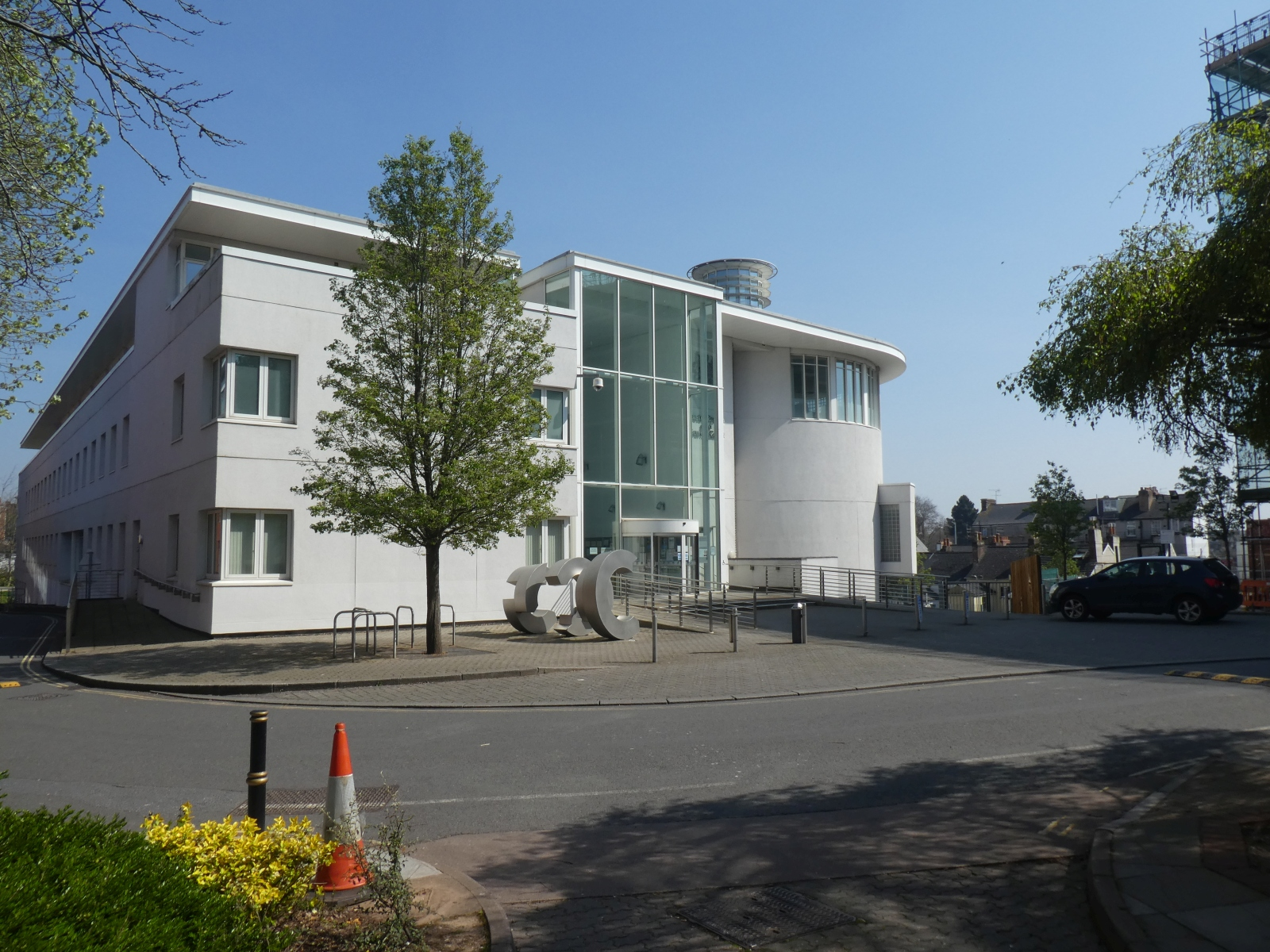
- Exeter Law Courts

- Shown in Devon
- 50.7213°N 3.5251°W
- Location: Southernhay Gardens, Exeter, England

History
- Built: 2004

Site notes
- Architect: Jacobs Babtie
- Architectural style: Modernist style

The Exeter Law Courts is a Crown Court venue, which deals with criminal cases, as well as a County Court venue, which deals with civil cases, in Southernhay Gardens, Exeter, England.

== History ==
Until the early 21st century all criminal and civil court hearings were held in the old Law Courts at Exeter Castle. However, as the number of court cases in Exeter grew, it became necessary to commission a more modern courthouse for both Crown Court hearings and County Court hearings. The site selected by the Lord Chancellor's Department had formed part of the original site of the Royal Devon and Exeter Hospital at Southernhay.

The new building was procured under a Private Finance Initiative contract in 2002. It was designed by Jacobs Babtie in the Modernist style, built by Sir Robert McAlpine at a cost of £20 million and was completed in 2004.

The design involved an asymmetrical main frontage facing west along Southernhay Gardens. The left hand section was faced in white cladding and fenestrated at the corners by four small casement windows on two levels; the central section featured a three-storey atrium, while the right hand section, which was also three storeys high, featured a narrow full height blind wall with a Royal coat of arms at second floor level and, to the right of that a curved section with three tri-partite windows at second floor level. Internally, the building was laid out to accommodate six courtrooms.

Notable cases included the trial and conviction of Lisa Hayden-Johnson, in January 2010, on charges of child cruelty and perverting the course of justice. They also included the trial and conviction of two men, in April 2013, over a plot to rob and murder the singer, Joss Stone, at her home in Cullompton, Devon.
