= Britt Barbie (singer) =

American rapper and social media personality

- Occupations: Social personality; singer
- Years active: 2022–present

Britt Barbie is an American rapper and social media personality. She went viral on TikTok for discovering her hair continuously grows from her scalp and her catchphrase, “period ahh, period uhh!” about which she released a song.

== Career ==
During August 2022, Britt Barbie posted a TikTok video with her using the “period ahh, period uhh” catchphrase in which it became viral and eventually led to her releasing a song of the same name.

Britt Barbie has been involved in many controversies. She was accused of being an ableist and faking a disability. During a livestream she was called out for making fun of African-American women.

== Discography ==
List of singles as lead artist, showing year released and originating album
Year	Title	Album
“Period Ahh, Period Uhh”	2022	Non Album Singles
“How Bout That”	2022	Non Album Singles
“Periodt”	2022	Non Album Singles
“Hello Kitty”	2023	Non Album Singles
“Queen Of STL”	2023	Non Album Singles
"From The Back" (featuring VladHQ)	2024	Non Album Singles
”I'm Not Skupid (My Hair Grew)”	2024	Non Album Singles
"Bop"	2025	Non Album Singles
“Micro Arp”	2025	Non Album Singles
“Shake it Baby”	2025	Non Album Singles
"Bag Secured (Period)"	2026	Non Album Singles
“How to Milly Rock”	2026	Non Album Singles
“Female Eminem”	2026	Non Album Singles
