= PPCM =

PPCM or ppcm may refer to:

- Pixels per centimetre (typically written all in lowercase "ppcm"), a measure of pixel density
- Packed PCM, compressed PCM audio data, also known as Meridian Lossless Packing (MLP)
- Peripartum cardiomyopathy, a deterioration in cardiac function
