= Doctor shopping =

Practice of obtaining prescriptions

Doctor shopping is the practice of visiting multiple physicians to obtain multiple prescriptions. It is a common practice of people with substance use disorders, suppliers of addictive substances, hypochondriacs or patients of factitious disorder and factitious disorder imposed on another. A doctor who, for a price, will write prescriptions without the formality of a medical exam or diagnosis is known as a "writer" or "writing doctor".

== Description ==
A doctor shopper will visit multiple health care providers as a "new patient" or "visiting from out of town", and will exaggerate or feign medical problems to obtain prescription medications or a wanted medical opinion, diagnosis or treatment with no specific material gain.

This is illegal in Canada under S. 4(2) of the CDSA.

=== For prescription drugs ===
Frequently involved in prescription fraud are narcotics, stimulants, barbiturates, benzodiazepines, tranquilizers and other psychoactive substances manufactured for use in legitimate medical treatment. Law enforcement officers spend a significant amount of time investigating cases involving prescription fraud, many of which also involve insurance, Medicare, or Medicaid fraud.

Prescription drug diversion occurs by faking, forging, or altering a prescription; obtaining bogus prescriptions from criminal medical practitioners; or buying drugs diverted from health care facilities by personnel. Pharmacy thefts are increasing throughout the United States to feed the growing demand for prescription drugs. The rising cost of prescription drugs has also enticed senior citizens to join in the diversion and to sell their prescriptions.

=== In hypochondriasis and factitious disorders ===
Some patients of hypochondria, factitious disorder and factitious disorder imposed on another will visit multiple health care providers to find a medical opinion, diagnosis or treatment that they feel the need to get, not specifically in search of prescription drugs, for no material benefit and even incurring in significant costs, debts or losses. This kind of doctor shopping lacks intention to commit malingering for material gain and is the result of such mental conditions.

== See also ==
- Pill mill
- Forum shopping
