= Staudte family murders =

Criminal case

The Staudte family murders case, also known as "The Antifreeze Murders", was a series of killings and attempted killings in the Staudte family of Springfield, Missouri, during a five-month period in 2012. Family matriarch Diane Staudte and her daughter, Rachel Staudte, committed the crimes together using antifreeze purchased on the internet, with the rationale that antifreeze sold online would not contain the added bittering agent in commercial chemicals making the ethylene glycol poison detectable. Diane's husband, Mark Staudte, was murdered first, followed five months later by her autistic 26-year-old son, Shaun Staudte. 24-year-old daughter Sarah Staudte was also poisoned with antifreeze and taken to hospital in critical condition; she survived and later recovered, albeit with physical and neurological damage. Diane Staudte was sentenced to life in prison without the possibility of parole in 2016, while Rachel Staudte pleaded guilty to second-degree murder in May 2015 as part of a plea deal in exchange for testifying against her mother, and eventually was sentenced in March 2016 to life in prison with the possibility of parole. Diane is currently incarcerated at Chillicothe Correctional Center in Chillicothe, Missouri.

== Background ==
Diane and Mark Staudte were a married couple living in a modest home in Springfield, Missouri with four children: Shaun (age 26), Sarah (age 24), Rachel (age 22), and another daughter, aged nine. The Staudte children had varying special needs, with Shaun on the autism spectrum and living at home, and the nine-year-old girl, then a fourth-grade student, having learning disabilities. In addition, Sarah, a university graduate, had incurred large student loan debt and was also living at home. Diane favored Rachel over the other siblings and often praised Rachel and uploaded photos of her on social media. The family was musically talented and enjoyed contemporary religious music; Diane was a church organist and trained nurse, while Mark was the lead singer and guitarist of a local blues band called Messing With Destiny. Mark brought in minimal income, sometimes taking odd jobs related to the band for extra earnings, and Diane was the main source of income for the family, which Rachel revealed was one motive for Mark's death.

After being arrested for the murders, Diane and Rachel claimed the targeted family members were burdens on them. Diane alleged that Mark was lazy, threw objects when angry, and that by the point of killing him, she "hated his guts". She claimed that Shaun was "worse than a pest" as he was always in the home and had trouble socializing due to his autism, leading her to kill him as well, although Rachel claimed that she initially felt Shaun's death was unfair, arguing that her mother should have placed Shaun in assisted living instead. The murders of Mark and Shaun Staudte occurred within five months of each other. Both victims were found with a suspicious ring of blood around their mouths, but the deaths were not investigated any further, owing in part to Mark's lifestyle, which included regular alcohol consumption. Both bodies were cremated. Diane went further when she considered killing Sarah as well, because she did not want to pay Sarah's student debt. The 24-year-old was poisoned, then later taken to a hospital by Diane who did not want the house to smell bad if Sarah died in it (by that point, Diane had used Mark's US$20,000 life insurance policy to move the family to another, larger house). Rachel was also bothered by the prospect of Sarah dying in the house, because she had moved into the room where Shaun had died and claimed that it was unsettling to her. Sarah was admitted in critical condition, with organ failure and neurological damage presenting.

== Investigation ==
An anonymous tip, later revealed to be from the Staudtes' church pastor, alerted police that the deaths of Mark and Shaun Staudte were possibly connected to Sarah's acute symptoms. Multiple people who knew the Staudtes had observed that Diane did not express grief for the loss of Mark and Shaun; instead, she frequented Facebook and appeared aloof about the deaths. Family relative Michael Staudte revealed that there were no formal services to commemorate Shaun held and that he was only informed of Shaun's passing after another relative discovered it. Robert "Rob" Mancuso of Messing With Destiny recalled that Diane was behaving "like she was hosting a party! There was no sadness. I thought it was just her way of grieving."

When police investigated the case, Diane planned a vacation to Florida and was still residing with Rachel in the house where Shaun died and Sarah fell ill. Diane revealed that she and Rachel had poisoned their family members with antifreeze. They added the antifreeze to sports drinks that Mark regularly consumed, as well as Shaun's favorite soda pop, and specifically bought it online to ensure there was no noticeable taste to it. Unlike most antifreeze sold to the public, this antifreeze lacked an oft-added bittering agent that would have left a foul taste. Rachel had written a bizarre poem on a note later discovered in her purse, which read, "Only the quiet ones will be left, my mother, my little sister and me." Rachel's hidden diary revealed that she was involved directly in the murders and was aware of Mark's impending poisoning at least two months beforehand. Rachel and Diane also admitted that the remaining daughter, the youngest, was to be poisoned after Sarah's death because of the burden of her learning disabilities. Rachel Staudte pleaded guilty in May 2015 to two counts of second-degree murder and one count of first-degree assault. Her mother, Diane Staudte, pleaded guilty to two counts of murder in January 2016 and was sentenced to life in prison without the possibility of parole. Both Rachel and Diane appealed to vacate their pleas, with Rachel arguing, "when lawyers were appointed, my fear of men was not accommodated, leading to miscommunication, coercion (and) mental duress. Being in an interview room alone with a male detective was like being flayed alive."

== Remaining family members ==
It is unclear what happened to the nine-year-old daughter after the arrest of Diane and Rachel. At that time a fourth-grade student and minor child, she had not yet been poisoned. The girl, whose new name has not been identified by news sources due to her age, was placed in foster care. Sarah Staudte survived but suffered severe organ damage and neurological damage. Her symptoms, initially thought to be flu-like, were later revealed to be caused by the poisoning. Sarah maintains a Facebook profile with information about the murder case, as well as a profile banner photo of her father performing in Messing With Destiny. Sarah was given the opportunity to read the following statement in court: "I prefer to be a survivor than a victim. I forgive my mom for what she did to me. But she not only took away my dad and brother, but she took away my lifestyle, livelihood and my independence." Sarah, who had been on the Dean's List during her years in university, was said by Greene County Prosecuting Attorney Dan Patterson to require "a guardian, and living in an assisted living facility" due to the effects of the poison on her body and mental state.

== Public response ==
The public and media expressed disgust over Diane's favoritism to Rachel and her view of her disabled children as burdens. In particular focus was Rachel's attitude towards the murders; Rachel had written in her diary, prior to her father's death, "It's sad when I realized how my father will pass on in the next two months... Shaun, my brother, will move on shortly after... it will be tough getting used to the changes but everything will work out." After Shaun's murder, Rachel had posted a selfie on Facebook of herself sitting cross-legged and smiling, with a post that read, "don't think I've seen Mom [Diane] so chilled out like this in a long time." The case was covered extensively by various national and local news agencies. Additionally, the case was discussed at length in multiple true crime YouTube videos, and featured in a segment of 20/20, where Sarah Staudte was interviewed in recovery from her poisoning. Sarah had stated she had forgiven her mother despite what she had done to her, citing her religion as a Christian as a motivating favor in forgiveness.

== See also ==
- Shauna Taylor case
