= Factitious disorder imposed on self =

Compulsion towards imitating symptoms of illness to gain attention or care

- Other names: Munchausen syndrome
- Specialty: Psychiatry

Factitious disorder imposed on self (FDIS), commonly called Munchausen syndrome, is a complex mental disorder in which an individual imitates symptoms of illness in order to elicit attention, sympathy, or physical care. Patients with FDIS intentionally falsify or induce signs and symptoms of illness, trauma, or abuse to assume this role. These actions are performed consciously, though the patient may be unaware of their motivations. There are several risk factors and signs associated with this illness and treatment is usually in the form of psychotherapy, but may depend on the specific situation, which is further discussed below. Diagnosis is usually determined by meeting specific DSM-5 criteria after ruling out true illness as described below.

Factitious disorder imposed on self is related to factitious disorder imposed on another, the abuse of another person in order to seek attention or sympathy for the abuser. This is "Munchausen by proxy", and the drive to create symptoms for the victim can result in unnecessary and costly diagnostic or corrective procedures. Other similar and often confused syndromes and diagnoses are discussed in the "Related diagnoses" section.

== History and terminology ==
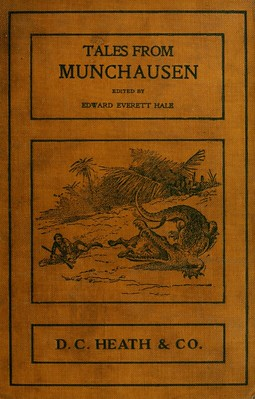
Tales from the fictional German character Freiherr Von Munchausen.

That patients can exaggerate or inflict symptoms on themselves has been recognized since antiquity, with the second century manuscript attributed to Galen titled On Feigned Diseases and the Detection of Them. In 1843, the Scots physician Hector Gavin invented the term "factitious disease" to describe persons who faked medical symptoms for sympathy, attention or "some inexplicable cause". In the 1930s, the psychiatrist Karl Menninger noted some patients compulsively insisted on medically unnecessary surgeries, often seeking out a physician with a powerful or dynamic personality.

In 1951, Richard Asher coined "Munchausen syndrome" for a pattern of self-harm where individuals fabricated histories, signs, and symptoms of illness. The name alludes to Baron Munchausen, a fictional character who tells many fantastic and impossible stories about himself. Asher's article was published in The Lancet in February 1951. The name sparked some controversy, with medical authorities debating the appropriateness of the name for about fifty years. While Asher was praised for bringing cases of factitious disorder to light, participants in the debate objected variously that a literary allusion was inappropriate given the seriousness of the disease; and that the name's connection to works of humor and fantasy, and to the essentially ridiculous character of the fictional Baron Munchausen, was disrespectful to patients with the disorder. Some healthcare providers avoid this term because it downplays the complexity of the illness and devalues the patient experience.

The term "factitious disorder imposed on self" provides a more neutral description of the mental disorder; however, both terms may still be used interchangeably in practice.

== Risk factors ==
The exact cause of this illness is unknown due to limited research but is likely the result of multiple psychosocial factors. Specific risk factors have been associated with developing FDIS, specifically a history of childhood trauma, abandonment, having a serious childhood illness, and certain personality disorders. Patients are more likely to be female, middle aged, and work in the healthcare industry. Individuals with this disorder may also have a history of recurrent hospitalizations and frequent visits to multiple different physicians (i.e. doctor shopping). They are also more likely to have underlying depression, though it is unclear if it is a cause or symptom of this illness. Some researchers suggest other various psychiatric disorders may coincide, namely Histrionic personality disorder or Borderline Personality Disorder. The comorbidity of these psychiatric disorders with FDIS can be termed a Tripolar Syndrome.

== Signs and symptoms ==
In factitious disorder imposed on self, the affected person exaggerates or creates physical or psychological symptoms of illnesses in themselves to gain examination, treatment, attention, sympathy or comfort from medical personnel. Because these symptoms can vary depending on how patients induce these symptoms, there is no consistent symptom specific for this illness. However, there are several common themes that may raise suspicion for FDIS. Some of these common themes include:

- Prolonged, repeated hospital stays
- Frequent visits to multiple different physicians
- Opting for unnecessary operations or procedures where the results are generally normal or inconclusive
- Inconsistencies in past medical history, where illness/procedural history stated by patient is different than their documented history
- Vague, nonspecific pain unresponsive to normal treatment options

Common examples of commonly induced physical symptoms include intentionally infecting a wound with debris or unsanitary material, taking laxatives to induce diarrhea, or ingesting thyroid hormone replacement medication to simulate a hyperactive thyroid or hyperthyroidism.

== Diagnosis ==
Due to the behaviors involved, diagnosing factitious disorder is very difficult. Because induced symptoms may mimic those of a real disease or disorder, physicians must first rule out genuine disease. Therefore, FDIS is usually a diagnosis of exclusion. To rule out genuine illness, lab tests may be required, including complete blood count (CBC), urine toxicology, drug tests, blood cultures to rule out infection, coagulation tests, assays for thyroid function, or DNA typing, depending on the mimicked disease. In some cases CT scan, magnetic resonance imaging, psychological testing, electroencephalography, or electrocardiography may be required. A more extensive list of how organic illness is differentiated from FDIS is provided below.

If the healthcare provider finds no physical reason for the symptoms, they may refer the person to a psychiatrist or psychologist (mental health professionals who are specially trained to diagnose and treat mental illnesses). Psychiatrists and psychologists use thorough history, physical examinations, laboratory tests, imagery, and psychological testing to evaluate a person for physical and mental conditions and to distinguish between feigned versus real illness. Once the person's history has been thoroughly evaluated, diagnosing factitious disorder imposed on self requires a clinical assessment, typically performed by a psychiatrist.

For a person to be diagnosed with factitious disorder imposed on self, they must meet the following criteria:

1. The patient presents as sick or injured motivated by a primary gain, or internal reward of validation/attention, as opposed to a secondary gain, which usually involves external benefits.
2. There is evidence that the patient is inducing or falsifying their symptoms
3. There is no alternative explanation, mental disorder, or illness to explain the patient's symptoms

== Common manifestations ==
There are common methods for inducing certain symptoms and mimicking specific diseases. As mentioned earlier, it is important to first rule out true disease. Oftentimes this requires multiple lab tests as a form of differential diagnosis, especially when the disease is mimicked closely in patients with existing medical knowledge. Physicians usually must have a high suspicion for FDIS to pursue it as a likely diagnosis based on abnormal patient behaviors and medical history. Some examples of these manifestations are listed in the table below, along with how to differentiate real versus mimicked disease using medical laboratory tests or imaging.

Disease mimicked	Method of imitation	Laboratory/diagnostic confirmation
Bartter syndrome	Taking diuretics to urinate excessively or self-induced vomiting; Termed "pseudo-Bartter syndrome"; Creates an electrolyte imbalance in the body	Measure blood or urine diuretic levels to detect medication as the cause; Urinary chloride levels will be high in true Bartter syndrome vs. low in pseudo-Bartter syndrome
Catecholamine-secreting tumor (i.e., carcinoid tumor)	Injection of epinephrine into urine or blood stream; Causes diarrhea, facial flushing, wheezing, heart palpitations, weight loss	Chromogranin A is a tumor marker for carcinoid tumors; blood levels are typically elevated in the presence of a tumor but remain normal in individuals with FDIS.
Cushing's syndrome	Secret steroid medication (e.g., prednisone) administration (note: patients admitting that they are prescribed steroids for another medical condition will experience this, but this would not be considered FDIS since the patient is not deceitful or withholding information or intending to have Cushing's syndrome); Over time, patients will experience weight gain, easy bruising, rounding of the face, increase in blood pressure, and increase in infections	Urine test to detect use of steroids
Hyperthyroidism	Secret thyroxine, a thyroid hormone, administration (note: patients may be prescribed this medication for low thyroid levels); Produces symptoms of heart palpitations, weight loss, hot flashes, diarrhea, and abnormal menstrual cycles	Low radioactive iodine thyroid uptake, which would be elevated in true hyperthyroidism; Low thyroglobulin levels, which should be elevated in true hyperthyroidism
Hypoglycaemia	Secretly using more insulin than prescribed and acting as though they are not; Produces symptoms of low blood sugar, including shaking, sweating, dizziness, confusion, and an irregular heartbeat	C-peptide, a byproduct of normal insulin production in the human body, will be low in patients with FDIS; C-peptide is not found in medical insulin but is found in the body, as it is produced at the same time as insulin
Chronic diarrhea (Factitious diarrhea)	Excessive intake of laxatives to produce diarrhea and acting like it's from an unknown cause; Produces electrolyte imbalances in the body and dehydration; Many cases may mimic inflammatory bowel disease or malabsorption syndromes	Stool analysis to detect laxative use; Stool osmolality >600 mOsm/kg or <290 mOsm/kg may indicated FDIS; Colonoscopy may show brown discoloration of the colon, called melanosis coli, often seen in laxative abuse
Proteinuria (protein in urine)	Surreptitious addition of protein, usually albumin, to sample	Perform urine protein electrophoresis; Investigate corresponding transferrin levels, albumin rarely exceeds 75% of total urine protein; Use of antibodies and band detection on various alpha, beta, and gamma regions can differentiate between human and non-human proteins
Haematuria (bloody urine)	Deliberately contaminating urine sample with blood; Intentionally causing trauma to the urethra	Imaging to rule out insertion of a foreign body; Monitor sample collection; Analysis of red blood cell shape in samples, which will show excessively destroyed red blood cells in FDIS

=== Munchausen by Internet ===
Munchausen by internet is a term describing the feigning of illness online to garner sympathy and support. Described in medical literature as a manifestation of FDIS, it is not an independent diagnostic classification. Reports of users who deceive internet forum participants by portraying themselves as gravely ill or as victims of violence first appeared in the 1990s due to the relative newness of Internet communications. The specific internet pattern was named "Münchausen by internet" in 1998 by psychiatrist Marc Feldman. New Zealand PC World Magazine called Munchausen by Internet "cybermunch", and those who posed online "cybermunchers". More recently, online forums such as snark subreddits have labelled these individuals as "illness fakers" or "munchies".

During the COVID-19 pandemic, an increasing number of TikTok users, primarily teenage girls, began to present with tics and vocalizations similar to those associated with Tourette syndrome. However, lack of congruent family history and other diagnostic criteria led some experts to interpret this phenomenon as mass psychogenic illness facilitated by social media. Mass psychogenic illness is described as requiring physical proximity to spread, hence technologically-facilitated conversion is differentiated under the label "Mass Social Media-Induced Illness" (MSMI). Other conditions feigned as a result of MSMI include autism spectrum disorders, attention deficit hyperactivity disorders, dissociative identity disorder, ME/CFS, and bipolar disorders.

== Treatment ==
When confronted with this diagnosis, patients often refuse to accept it and will continue their behaviors seeking healthcare at different institutions or physicians. Those who accept the diagnosis benefit most from psychotherapy delivered by a skilled therapist or psychiatrist. In doing so, patients can learn the underlying subconscious motivations that drive their conscious behaviors in order to develop a sense of awareness that prevents them from continuing these harmful behaviors. If a person is considered to be at risk of harming themself or others, psychiatric hospitalization may be initiated.

Specific forms of therapy may be tailored to underlying personality disorders or difficulties contributing to their behaviors. For example, dialectical behavior therapy (DBT) can be used to treat borderline personality disorder. Medications may be necessary to treat an underlying mood disorder or anxiety disorder, as many patients with this disorder may have underlying depression. Patients with underlying depression and/or anxiety are typically responsive to antidepressants with or without cognitive behavioral therapy, a form of psychotherapy.

== Related diagnoses ==
Factitious disorder imposed on self can sometimes be difficult to distinguish from several related diagnoses, but they differ in their motivational gains and control over symptoms. "Gain" is a Freudian psychoanalytic term that is used to describe the psychological benefits that drive certain illnesses and their behaviors. A primary gain refers to internal benefits from a symptom or illness, like feeling a decrease in emotional or psychological stress. A secondary gain refers to the external benefits from a symptom or illness, like receiving financial benefits or avoiding a stressful activity.

Factitious disorder is distinct from malingering in that people with factitious disorder do not fabricate symptoms for material gain such as financial compensation, absence from work, or access to drugs. Somatiform disorders include a range of illnesses where physical symptoms result from psychological stressors. Perhaps the most common subtype, functional neurologic disorder is characterized by psychological distress resulting from neurologic symptoms (e.g., paralysis, seizures, or loss of vision) that typically coincide with periods of psychological stress and are not due to an underlying neurologic condition. Below is a table outlining the differences between these related diagnoses.

Diagnosis	Production of Symptoms	Motivation for Symptoms	Control Over Symptoms	Gain	Example
Factitious Disorder Imposed on Self	Conscious	Unconscious	Voluntary	Primary	Taking laxatives to present as having chronic diarrhea from an unknown origin in order to receive attention/sympathy from playing the sick role
Malingering	Conscious	Conscious	Voluntary	Secondary	Faking cold-like symptoms to intentionally avoid going into work.
Somatiform Disorders	Unconscious	Unconscious	Involuntary	Primary	Experiencing vision loss in one eye after being fired despite having normal eye functions on physical exam

Factitious disorder imposed on another, also referred to as Munchausen's by proxy, occurs when an individual induces symptoms or feigns illness in someone else to receive some form of psychological satisfaction for themselves. This has been documented in the parent or guardian of a child or the owner of a pet animal. The adult ensures that their child will experience some medical condition, therefore compelling the child to suffer through treatments and spend a significant portion during youth in hospitals. Furthermore, a disease may actually be initiated in the child by the parent or guardian. This condition is considered distinct from Munchausen syndrome. There is growing consensus in the pediatric community that this disorder should be renamed "medical abuse" to highlight the harm caused by the deception and to make it less likely that the sufferer can use a psychiatric defense when harm is done.

== See also ==
- List of Munchausen by proxy cases
- Hypochondriasis
- Psychosomatic illness

== Bibliography ==
- Feldman M (2004). Playing sick?: untangling the web of Munchausen syndrome, Munchausen by proxy, malingering & factitious disorder. Philadelphia: Brunner-Routledge. ISBN 978-0-415-94934-7.
- Fisher JA (2006). "Playing patient, playing doctor: Munchausen syndrome, clinical S/M, and ruptures of medical power". The Journal of Medical Humanities. 27 (3): 135–49. doi:10.1007/s10912-006-9014-9. PMID 16817003. S2CID 40739963.
- Fisher JA (2006). "Investigating the Barons: narrative and nomenclature in Munchausen syndrome". Perspect. Biol. Med. 49 (2): 250–62. doi:10.1353/pbm.2006.0024. PMID 16702708. S2CID 12418075.
- Friedel RO (4 August 2004). Borderline Personality Disorder Demystified. Hachette Books. pp. 9–10. ISBN 978-1-56924-456-2.
- Davidson G (2008). Abnormal Psychology (3rd Canadian ed.). Wiley. p. 412. ISBN 978-0-470-84072-6.
- Prasad A, Oswald AG (1985). "Munchausen's syndrome: an annotation". Acta Psychiatrica Scandinavica. 72 (4): 319–22. doi:10.1111/j.1600-0447.1985.tb02615.x. PMID 4072733. S2CID 40707.
- Schneps L, Colmez C (2013). "1. Math error number 1: multiplying non-independent probabilities. The case of Sally Clark: motherhood under attack". Math on trial. How numbers get used and abused in the courtroom. Basic Books. ISBN 978-0-465-03292-1.
- "Munchausen syndrome". Mayo Foundation for Medical Education and Research. 13 May 2011. Archived from the original on 10 August 2016.
- Zuger A (July 1993). "The Baron Strikes Again". Discover magazine.
