= Death of Olivia Gant =

2017 death by neglect in Denver, Colorado, US

Olivia K. Gant (June 21, 2010 – August 20, 2017) was a 7-year-old American girl who died after ongoing medical abuse by her mother, Kelly Renee Turner-Gant, in what was deemed to be a case of Munchausen by proxy. Turner-Gant had initially taken the girl to the hospital for a case of severe constipation; after this was treated successfully and Gant was sent home, Turner-Gant claimed that Gant was unable to consume food, leading to numerous surgeries, the implementation of feeding tubes, and finally an intravenous tube that fed nutrients directly into her veins.

The constant hospital visits and surgeries left Gant at times in a wheelchair and bedridden, weakened by an anti-seizure medication that Turner-Gant had convinced a doctor to prescribe her. Gant's death occurred after Turner-Gant swapped Gant's usual doctors, who had refused to sign a do not resuscitate order for the girl, for another doctor willing to sign the order. This allowed Turner-Gant to have all of Gant's feeding tubes removed. Gant was placed in hospice care, where she died from apparent intestinal failure on August 20, 2017. Turner-Gant, who by then went by the name Kelly Turner, was convicted of child abuse in 2022 and sentenced to 16 years in prison.

== Early life ==
Olivia K. Gant was born in Pasadena, Texas, where she resided with her mother, two sisters and father. Gant's parents had a difficult marriage, although Gant was close with a beloved relative, step-grandfather Lonnie Gautreau, who recalled her being "a loving child; she just had a great imagination and loved playing with her dolls." After moving to Colorado, Kelly Turner-Gant would actively take photographs of Gant, mostly related to the girl's hospital visits, and share them online with viewers. Gant would be dressed in Disney merchandise and surrounded by plush animals, often lying in bed or sitting upright in a wheelchair.

== Medical abuse ==
In 2012, Turner-Gant took Gant to Children's Hospital Colorado for treatment related to severe constipation. Although the treatment (removing hardened stool from the girl's colon) was successful, Turner-Gant soon returned, reporting that Gant was unable to consume food properly. Gant underwent multiple surgeries for this reported problem, including one surgery where her small intestine was rerouted through her large intestine, taking away feces from a bag affixed to her stomach. Gant was kept on heavy narcotic drugs over a five-year period that followed for most of her remaining life, and was taken to over 1,000 documented hospital visits prior to her death.

In addition to the medical abuse, Turner-Gant would tell her friends that Gant was terminally ill, and used sympathy to scam various charity organizations. She would post Gant's "bucket list" of things her daughter wanted to do before she died. With the aid of the Make-a-Wish Foundation and other local groups, this included an elaborate bat-themed princess party (combining elements of Batman and Disney Princess franchises, in a booking that cost $11,000). Other events were established where Gant would get to pretend to be a firefighter and police officer. It is believed that Turner-Gant scammed various organizations and individuals out of over $500,000; Christopher Gallo, speaking for the prosecution during Turner-Gant's trial, stated that Turner-Gant had engaged in "the perpetration of hundreds of thousands of dollars of fraud on organizations whose only purpose in this world is to help sick kids and families in need."

Gant had three different types of feeding tubes surgically implanted at different points, as well as being kept on a strong anti-seizure medication. No doctor had ever witnessed her having a seizure, but Turner-Gant convinced the prescribing doctor that the medication was necessary. Turner-Gant then also had her daughter given intravenous nutrition, arguing that the other feeding tube methods were failing to work.

== Death ==
Turner-Gant had been able to get a do not resuscitate order for Gant; her usual doctors had refused to sign it, leading Turner-Gant to switch doctors until she was able to find one who would sign the documentation. Turner-Gant then had all of Gant's feeding tubes removed, and the girl was placed in hospice care. She was reportedly in good spirits at first, singing the song "Hakuna Matata" from Disney's The Lion King with her mother. This changed drastically as Gant began to starve, while kept on potent drugs and given nothing but melted popsicle juice rubbed on her lips with a sponge to eat. Lonnie Gautreau stated that Gant was lucid the last time he saw her, and had told him that she was hungry. Gant died on August 20, 2017, ruled to have been caused by intestinal failure as a complication of her multiple medical conditions.

== Criminal investigation ==
It took over a year before authorities and medical staff began investigating Turner-Gant's potential influence in Gant's death, owing in part to Turner-Gant bringing Gant's sister into the hospital with similar ailments, which were found to be false. Turner-Gant was arrested in 2018 and taken into custody, where she faced multiple counts of felonies, including first-degree murder. She was also accused of defrauding Medicaid, over 100 individual donors who had given to her online fundraisers, Heflebower Funeral & Cremation Services, Seven Stones Cemetery, and two charity foundations that had offered help and support for Gant. Lonnie Gautreau also filed a separate civil lawsuit against Children's Hospital Colorado in 2021, which was settled out of court for an undisclosed amount. He expressed resentment in regard to the healthcare system, arguing that doctors should have done more to prevent Gant's abuse and Turner-Gant's power in the hospital itself.

== Conviction ==
Turner-Gant pleaded guilty in January 2022 to a felony charge of child abuse that negligently caused her daughter's death. As part of Turner-Gant's plea agreement, first-degree murder charges against her were dismissed and the prosecution and defense agreed to a 16-year prison term. Turner-Gant also pleaded guilty to felony theft and fraud charges, for which she received a combined 13-year prison sentence to be served concurrently. Turner-Gant later claimed that she was innocent of all of the charges, and that she had only pleaded guilty to spare her family the stress of a lengthier trial. Judge Patricia Herron stated that the sentence would not be reduced or reconsidered, noting that it is highly likely that Turner-Gant will be released on parole within a short time anyway, owing to her concurrent sentences and her plea deal protecting her from a murder conviction. Turner-Gant's two other daughters, who have not been named by the media, are no longer in Turner-Gant's care. The oldest daughter, who had been brought into Children's Hospital Colorado in early 2018 for what Turner-Gant had claimed was bone pain, had no further symptoms since October 2018 when Turner-Gant was no longer involved in her care.

== Public response ==
After Turner-Gant's conviction in 2022, the death of Gant was featured extensively in news reports and YouTube videos, deemed a case of Munchausen by Proxy that medical doctors should have recognized. Often likened to cases such as that of Gypsy-Rose Blanchard, Gant's case has generated debates over the role of healthcare professionals in preventing child abuse, as well as the recognition of Munchausen by Proxy as a mental illness. Heflebower Funeral & Cremation Services maintains an obituary webpage for Gant, which has since been saturated with comments from the general public pointing out Turner-Gant's involvement in Gant's death.

== See also ==
- Murder of Garnett Spears
- Shauna Taylor case
