= Shauna Taylor case =

2018 American criminal trial

The Shauna Taylor case was a 2018 criminal trial involving the investigation and conviction of Shauna Dee Taylor, a Floridian housewife who poisoned her prematurely-born infant daughter (unnamed in public sources) with Tylenol and iron supplements, causing acute liver damage due to iron poisoning, which the child unexpectedly survived. The case rose to further prominence in 2019 when two of Shauna's grown adult children, Annie and Joshua Taylor, appeared publicly on the daytime talk show Dr. Phil, reporting that all ten children documented as under Shauna's care at one point or another, including themselves, were subject to severe physical, verbal and medical abuse. Shauna was diagnosed with Munchausen by proxy and sentenced to 12 years in prison for aggravated child abuse, with 15 months of parole to follow.

== Background ==
Shauna and her husband Bill Taylor lived in various US states and had ten children, several of which were removed from their care due to allegations of abuse in California and Arizona. Bill claimed to have no knowledge of Shauna's abuse of the children, arguing that he was absent from the family most of the time for work. He divorced Shauna after the poisoning of their infant daughter. "The time that these poisonings occurred, I had been out of the home already for six months and I was working six days a week, 10 hours a day," Bill said in 2019. "On the several visits to the emergency room, I was scratching my head thinking, my gosh. How could all my kids have such severe medical issues?"

The extent of Shauna's abuse of the children under her care is unclear. Annie Taylor alleged on Dr. Phil that Shauna added unprescribed insulin to her milk when she was a child, with no medical advice from a professional. Josh Taylor reported children, including himself, were put in dog cages as a form of humiliation while Shauna shouted profanities at them, force-fed milk and money (metal coins he was made to swallow whole), and forcibly drugged with over-the-counter and prescription medications. Josh also had two spinal taps, seemingly for no apparent recorded medical reason. Shauna reportedly had an obsessive fixation on injuring the livers of her children and damaged their internal organs with repeated drugging and beatings. Annie and Josh reported that they continued to suffer the effects of this abuse into adulthood. These allegations made on Dr. Phil were later verified by ABC News, which revealed that Shauna's parental rights to the children had long-since been terminated.

== Attempted murder case ==
Shauna Taylor was 40 years old and a resident of Macclenny, Florida, when she had an infant daughter born premature in late 2012, whom she began bringing to emergency rooms in 2013 for unspecified illnesses. The child was presenting with severe liver damage. According to investigators, in Shauna's initial visits to the hospital, she included "exaggerated" and falsified symptoms of the child's health, as she was unable to poison the child's liver until she had enough iron pills to do so. In the third visit, the child was said to have experienced liver failure. "While the child was admitted to the hospital, [Shauna] would be there with the child and while she was there, she would administer the Tylenol to continue the abuse," according to Baker County Sheriff's Office Sergeant Tracie Benton, the lead detective on the case. Ultrasounds of the girl's liver showed abnormalities, and blood tests turned up high levels of iron. Around that time, investigators began receiving anonymous tips claiming that Taylor had Munchausen by proxy and was abusing the child. Those tipsters also informed investigators that Shauna started an online fundraising campaign for the child. Medical experts tested the child for certain poisons related to liver failure and determined the child's system contained iron well above regular levels. Eventually, after being removed from Shauna's care and given proper healthcare, the child's liver function returned to normal while she was in the hospital. Because the child survived, her name was never revealed by public news sources, and Shauna moved to another state, leaving the case largely buried.

In 2018, the Shauna Taylor Case was reinvestigated; the abuse of Annie, Josh and Shauna's other eight children then came out as news sources uncovered old records of situations where Child Protective Services removed various children from Shauna's care. Shauna was arrested in Albany, New York, extradited to Florida, and tried for the intentional 2013 poisoning of her infant daughter, by which point roughly five years had passed. Shauna initially pleaded not guilty. It was revealed that Shauna had a diagnosis of Munchausen by proxy, a psychological condition in which an individual imposes an appearance of a fake illness, or an actual illness, on a proxy, in most cases a minor child, for sympathy, money or attention. In Shauna's case, she attempted to destroy her child's liver to impose an illness; this was not unheard of in the United States at that time, as cases such as the murder of Garnett Spears and the Gypsy Rose Blanchard case were in the media in recent years. Shauna was convicted of aggravated child abuse and neglect and sentenced to 12 years in prison with 15 months of parole. Bill Taylor, who had maintained his innocence, was never charged or convicted of any crime or cited as Shauna's accomplice. By the time Shauna was sent to prison, Bill separated from her and lost contact with most of his children.

== See also ==
- Murder of Garnett Spears
- Death of Olivia Gant
- Staudte Family Murders
- List of Munchausen by proxy cases
