= Primary and secondary gain =

Psychoanalytic reason for disease

Primary gain and secondary gain, and more rarely tertiary gain, are terms used in medicine and psychology to describe the significant subconscious psychological motivators patients may have when presenting with symptoms. If these motivators are recognized by the patient, and especially if symptoms are fabricated or exaggerated for personal gain, then this is instead considered malingering. The difference between primary and secondary gain is that with primary gain, the reason a person may not be able to go to work is because they are injured or ill, whereas with secondary gain, the reason that person is injured or ill is so that they cannot go to work.

== Primary gain ==
Primary gain produces positive internal motivations. For example, a patient might feel guilty about being unable to perform some task. If a medical condition justifying an inability is present, it may lead to decreased psychological stress. Primary gain can be a component of any disease, but is most typically demonstrated in functional neurological symptom disorder — a psychiatric disorder in which stressors manifest themselves as physical symptoms without organic causes. The "gain" may not be particularly evident to an outside observer.

== Secondary gain ==
Secondary gain can also be a component of any disease, but is an external motivator. If a patient's disease allows them to miss work, avoid military duty, obtain financial compensation, obtain drugs, avoid a jail sentence, etc., these would be examples of a secondary gain. For instance, an individual having household chores completed by someone else because they have stomach cramps would be a secondary gain. In the context of a person with a significant psychiatric disability, this effect is sometimes called "secondary handicap".

== Tertiary gain ==
Tertiary gain, a less well-studied process, is the benefit that a third-party receives from the patient.
