= Murder of Garnett Spears =

2014 Munchausen syndrome by proxy murder in New York

- Born: Garnett-Paul Thompson Spears; December 3, 2008; Decatur, Alabama, U.S.
- Died: January 23, 2014 (aged 5); Valhalla, New York, U.S.
- Cause of death: Poisoning by table salt
- Known for: Murder case
- Parent(s): Chris Hill; Lacey Spears

Garnett-Paul Thompson Spears (December 3, 2008 – January 23, 2014) was a 5-year-old boy who died at a hospital in suburban Valhalla, New York. He was killed by his mother, Lacey Spears, who injected him with high levels of sodium, leading to encephalitis.

== Murder case ==
On March 2, 2015, a jury found Spears guilty of killing her son by poisoning him with table salt, which she gave to him from infancy through his feeding tube. Spears was charged with second-degree murder and first-degree manslaughter. On April 8, 2015, a judge sentenced Spears to 20 years to life in prison.

The judge in the case, Robert Neary, acknowledged that Spears suffers from Munchausen syndrome by proxy, and therefore did not sentence her to the maximum of 25 years in prison before parole eligibility. Her murder conviction was upheld in state appellate court and the state's highest court declined to review her conviction.

As of January 2023, she is imprisoned at the Bedford Hills Correctional Facility for Women, and eligible for parole no earlier than June 12, 2034.

== Lacey Spears ==
Lacey Spears, who was later diagnosed with factitious disorder imposed on another (FDIA), was born and raised in Decatur, Alabama. Lonely as a single mother and desperate for attention, Lacey constantly posted on social media about her son's health struggles, even going so far as to start a blog devoted to chronicling her search for a cure for whatever illnesses plagued him. Telling friends she wanted to leave Alabama, Lacey moved with Garnett to Florida to live with her maternal grandmother, Peggy.

Eventually, she moved with her son to the town of Chestnut Ridge, New York, 14 months prior to his death. There they lived in a community called The Fellowship for elderly and disabled people. To explain her son's paternity, she created a fictional character, police officer Blake, who died in a car accident. She lied to Garnett's biological father, Chris Hill, that Garnett was not his son and threatened him to keep his distance from her and Garnett.

== In media ==
- My Sweet Angel: The True Story of Lacey Spears, the Seemingly Perfect Mother Who Murdered Her Son in Cold Blood (2016) by John Glatt, published by St. Martin's Press
- Deadliest Mums & Dads episode "The Poisoning of Garnett Spears"
- The Investigation Discovery show Web of Lies episode "The Sick Boy"
- Devil in Suburbia episode "Failure to Thrive”

== See also ==
- Crime in New York
- List of poisonings
- Wendi Michelle Scott, a Maryland woman with FDIA who injected her four-year-old daughter with magnesium in 2007 and was sentenced to prison in 2008.
- Murder of Dee Dee Blanchard, a Missouri woman with FDIA who was killed by her daughter and her daughter's boyfriend in 2015.
- Death of Olivia Gant, a 2017 case in which a seven-year-old girl died through numerous acts of medical abuse by her mother, deemed FDIA and medical fraud.
- Shauna Taylor, a Florida woman who caused deliberate destruction to her unnamed child's liver in an act of FDIA and intentional poisoning.
