= Beverley Allitt =

English serial killer (born 1968)

Beverly Allitt
- Born: Beverly Gail Allitt; 4 October 1968 (age 58); Grantham, Lincolnshire, England
- Other name: The Angel of Death
- Status: Incarcerated
- Motive: Attention due to factitious disorder imposed on another
- Penalty: 13 life sentences, 4 counts of murder, 5 counts of attempted murder, 6 counts of GBH

Details
- Victims: 13 (4 deaths)
- Span of crimes: February – April 1991
- Country: United Kingdom
- Weapons: Insulin, potassium chloride, lidocaine
- Date apprehended: 1991
- Imprisoned at: Rampton Secure Hospital

Beverly Gail Allitt (born 4 October 1968) is an English serial killer who was convicted of murdering three infants and an 11-year-old boy, attempting to murder three others, and causing grievous bodily harm to six more at Grantham and Kesteven Hospital, Lincolnshire, between February and April 1991. She committed the murders as a state enrolled nurse on the hospital's children's ward.

Allitt administered large doses of insulin to at least two of her victims and a large air bubble was found in the body of another, but police were initially unable to establish how all of the attacks were carried out. In May 1993, Allitt received 13 life sentences at Nottingham Crown Court. The sentencing judge, Mr Justice David Latham, told Allitt that she was "a serious danger" to others and was unlikely ever to be considered safe enough to be released. Allitt is currently detained at Rampton Secure Hospital in Nottinghamshire. She became eligible for release on parole after her minimum tariff of 30 years' imprisonment expired in November 2021.

== Early life ==
Beverly Gail Allitt was born on 4 October 1968 and grew up in the village of Corby Glen near the town of Grantham. She had two sisters and a brother. Her father, Richard, worked in an off-licence and her mother was a school cleaner. Allitt attended Charles Read Secondary Modern School, having failed the test to enter Kesteven and Grantham Girls' School. She often volunteered for babysitting jobs. She left school at the age of 16 and took a course in nursing at Grantham College.

== Trial and imprisonment ==
Allitt had attacked 13 children, four fatally, over a 59-day period. It was only following the death of Becky Phillips that medical staff became suspicious of the number of cardiac arrests on the children's ward and police were called in. It was found that Allitt was the only nurse on duty for all the attacks on the children and had access to the drugs used. Four of Allitt's victims had died. She was charged with four counts of murder, eleven counts of attempted murder, and eleven counts of causing grievous bodily harm. Allitt entered pleas of not guilty to all charges. On 28 May 1993, she was found guilty on each charge and sentenced to 13 concurrent terms of life imprisonment, which she is serving at Rampton Secure Hospital in Nottinghamshire.

On 6 December 2007, Mr Justice Stanley Burnton, sitting in the High Court of Justice, London, ordered Allitt to serve the original minimum sentence of 30 years. It was reported that some families of Allitt's victims had previously mistakenly believed that her minimum tariff had been set at 40 years. Her minimum tariff expired in November 2021 and she is now eligible for release on parole. Allitt's motives have never been fully explained. According to one theory, she showed symptoms of a factitious disorder also known as Munchausen syndrome by proxy.

On 3 October 2023, it was reported that Allitt was appearing before a mental health tribunal to be assessed for a potential transfer to a mainstream prison. If the transfer takes place, Allitt will be eligible for parole after six months. On 8 December 2023, authorities reportedly denied her transfer request from the Rampton Secure Hospital, a high-security psychiatric facility, to a mainstream prison. She will not be eligible for another assessment until 2026 at the earliest.

== Legacy ==
Allitt was the subject of a book called Murder on Ward Four by Nick Davies. A BBC dramatisation of the case, Angel of Death (2005), featured Charlie Brooks as Allitt. Allitt's story was depicted in episodes of the true crime documentaries Crimes That Shook Great Britain, Deadly Women, Born To Kill?, Evil Up Close, Britain's Most Evil Killers, Nurses Who Kill and Martina Cole's Lady Killers.

Commentators drew comparisons between convicted murderer Lucy Letby and the Allitt case. The former detective who led the Allitt investigation suggested that Letby might have imitated Allitt's methods. Criminal psychologists Dominic Wilmott and David Holmes proposed that Letby could have been motivated by factitious disorder imposed on another, a theory also raised in relation to Allitt.^{31:15}

== See also ==
- List of serial killers in the United Kingdom
- List of medical and pseudo-medical serial killers
