= Believe in Magic =

British defunct charity

- Formation: 20 January 2012; 14 years ago
- Founder: Megan Bhari
- Defunct: 17 August 2020; 6 years ago
- Type: Nonprofit
- Registration no.: Charity number: 1145557
- Legal status: Charity
- Headquarters: United Kingdom
- Region served: England and Scotland
- Key people: Megan Bhari; Jean O'Brien

Believe in Magic was a British charity, founded in 2012, that aimed to relieve the needs of children in the United Kingdom suffering from severe or terminal illnesses. It was begun by 16-year-old Megan Bhari, whose mother, Jean O’Brien, falsely claimed Megan had been diagnosed with a brain tumour three years prior.

The charity gained prominence after it was supported by several celebrities, most notably British-Irish boy band One Direction. The charity was investigated by the Charity Commission for England and Wales in 2017, following concerns about its financial management and administration. The charity became the subject of controversy after accusations that Bhari and her mother lied about or exaggerated her illness, and was shut down in 2020. A review by Kingston Adult Safeguarding board concluded that Bhari was most likely a victim of Munchausen syndrome by proxy.

== History ==
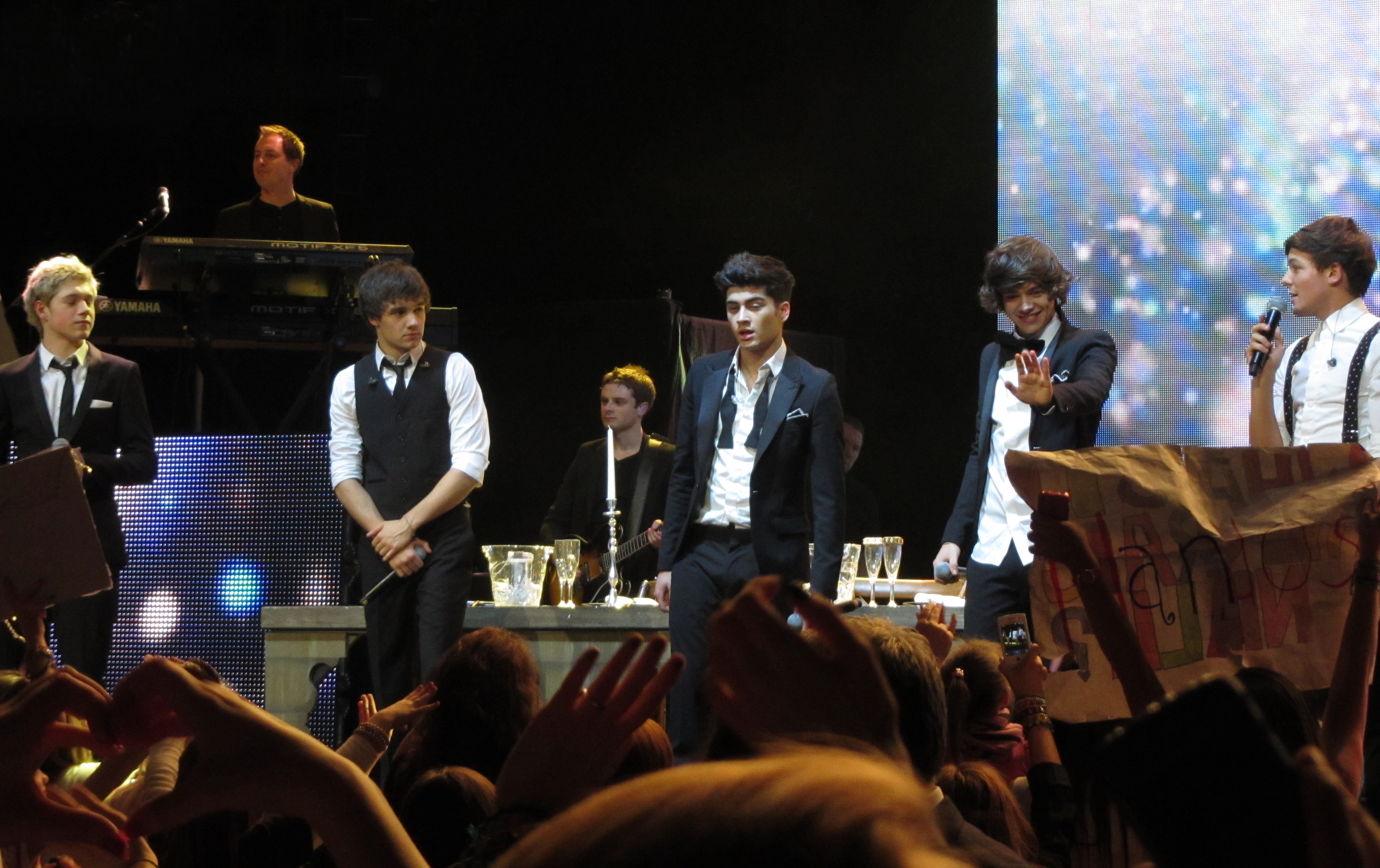
One Direction, who were major supporters of the charity, pictured at a concert in Glasgow in 2012

Believe in Magic was founded by 16-year-old Megan Bhari, who had been diagnosed with idiopathic intracranial hypertension three years previously. The organisation aimed to bring joy to terminally ill children. Her mother Jean O'Brien worked with her on the charity.

The charity was registered with the Charity Commission for England and Wales on 20 January 2012. In its first year, the charity received donations of £73,635. In 2013 it received £48,007 and in 2014 it received £32,783.

The charity rose to prominence after being supported by British-Irish boy band One Direction. The band repeatedly tweeted their support for the charity, wore bracelets onstage during their tours, and attended the charity's events. The band reportedly donated millions of pounds towards the charity, with band member Louis Tomlinson donating £2 million.

In 2015, Tomlinson hosted the "Believe in Magic Cinderella Ball", a fundraising gala, at the Natural History Museum, London, attended by band member Liam Payne. The same year, Bhari received an award from then-Prime Minister David Cameron, who praised her courage. The charity received support from several celebrities, including Jessie J, Olly Murs, Pixie Lott, Little Mix, Professor Green, Fearne Cotton, and Michael Bublé.

The group's charitable status was officially removed by the Charity Commission for England and Wales on 17 August 2020.

== Controversy ==
Despite its initial success and widespread acclaim, Believe in Magic became the subject of controversy. In 2015, O'Brien posted a JustGiving appeal on Facebook stating that Megan's condition had deteriorated, and launched a fundraising campaign seeking £120,000 for emergency medical treatment in the United States. The target was reached within 48 hours. A year later, O'Brien made another appeal for donations. Jo Ashcroft, the mother of a child diagnosed with neuroblastoma, led a group of parents to privately investigate the matter following their concerns that the appeal did not mention specific details, such as the hospital or doctor that would be treating Bhari.

The group discovered their emails were being opened in a luxury resort at Disney World in Orlando, Florida. Bhari and O’Brien travelled back to the UK on a cruise ship. A private investigator hired by Ashcroft photographed them disembarking from the cruise with Bhari appearing fit and not using oxygen. He reported that "Megan and Jean were pushing large luggages and laughing with no sign that Megan was ill".

The group had started a Facebook group called "The Truth About Meg & Jean" where they shared their discoveries. In 2017, the Charity Commission for England and Wales launched a statutory inquiry into the organisation due to concerns about its administration and financial management. The investigation resulted in the charity's accounts being frozen. The investigation revealed that the trustees failed to comply with their reporting duties, did not cooperate with the inquiry, and mismanaged the charity's funds. In addition, significant sums of money were found to be withdrawn in cash or transferred to personal accounts without adequate records to justify the transactions. Over £100,000 was unaccounted for at the time of the investigations.

On 28 March 2018, Megan Bhari died at the National Hospital for Neurology and Neurosurgery at the age of 23. The ensuing inquest into her death revealed that Bhari's brain had been "morphologically normal" with no sign of a tumour. The inquest also found that there had been attempts by O'Brien to obtain morphine using a forged prescription, and that she missed medical appointments and changed doctors frequently. Her cause of death was revealed to be acute cardiac arrhythmia, an abnormality of the rhythm of the heart, due to her fatty liver disease. O'Brien would tell the BBC following the discovery that Bhari had pituitary microadenoma, a non-cancerous brain tumour which is not typically life-threatening. A BBC podcast also titled Believe in Magic suggested Bhari had been a victim of Munchausen syndrome by proxy, a claim supported by academic Marc Feldman. Bhari's half-sister stated that she believed the illness was faked and charity started in order to meet with celebrities, particularly One Direction.

In 2022, Kingston Council, where Bhari had been living, published a report concluding that despite no formal diagnosis of Fabricated or Induced Illness (FII), the coroner's conclusion led all involved in the case to believe that it was likely a case of FII.

== Legacy ==
The incident was the subject of a seven-part podcast series named Believe in Magic by Jamie Bartlett on BBC Sounds. It was also the subject of a three-part BBC television series The Mother Of All Cons.
