= Lisa Hayden-Johnson =

British Munchausen by Proxy perpetrator

- Born: Lisa Hayden; 1972 (age 53–54)
- Known for: Perpetrating medical child abuse (Fabricated or Induced Illness - FII)
- Criminal charges: Child cruelty, perverting the course of justice
- Criminal penalty: 3 years and 3 months imprisonment
- Criminal status: Released
- Children: 2

Lisa Hayden-Johnson is a British woman who was living in Brixham, Devon, when she gained notoriety for having fabricated her son Matthew's severe illnesses for much of his early life, She was eventually convicted of child cruelty and other offences and was imprisoned. The case is an example of factitious disorder imposed on another (FDIA or FII), a form of abuse where a caregiver exaggerates or induces medical conditions in someone under their care in order to gain attention and sympathy.

== Background and crimes ==
Hayden-Johnson's son Matthew was born in 2001. Shortly after her son's birth, Hayden-Johnson began claiming he was afflicted with numerous severe health problems, including cerebral palsy, cystic fibrosis, diabetes, and severe food allergies. In the ensuing years, Matthew underwent over 325 medical encounters and numerous hospital visits, and was sometimes made to use a wheelchair when in public and to eat mainly through feeding tubes. Matthew was sometimes referred to in the media as the "illest child in the country".

In response to her son's apparent health problems, Hayden-Johnson and her family received significant public attention and sympathy. Public figures such as the Duchess of Cornwall and former Prime Minister Tony Blair also met with the family. Hayden-Johnson successfully campaigned for her son to receive a Child of Courage award in 2005.

== Legal proceedings and sentencing ==
In 2007, suspicions came to a head that Hayden-Johnson had been fabricating her son's illnesses for over six years and she was subsequently arrested and charged. At the ensuing trial, health professionals said that they had been bullied and threatened with legal action if they said they could find nothing wrong with Matthew and that Hayden-Johnson had falsely claimed to have been a qualified nurse. The court heard that her actions were driven by a desire for attention and financial gain, sometimes appearing on television and receiving government benefits and charity donations for her son's care.The judge said in his summing up that significant physical and psychological harm had been inflicted on Matthew.

In January 2010, Lisa Hayden-Johnson was sentenced to three years and three months in prison after pleading guilty to charges of child cruelty and perverting the course of justice.

== Impact and aftermath ==
Lisa's son Matthew, whose identity was protected at the time of the trial, has reportedly been recovering from the years of unnecessary medical treatment he endured. Lisa also has a daughter named Laura, who was not subjected to the same level of abuse.

In 2026 Channel 4 released a 3-part documentary called "I Love You To Death", which included interviews with Lisa Hayden-Johnson, police and health professionals as well as Matthew and Laura Johnson telling their side of the story.
