= Factitious disorder imposed on another =

Mental illness in which a caregiver fakes health problems in another person

Factitious disorder imposed on another (FDIA)
- Other names: Munchausen syndrome by proxy (MSbP); Munchausen by proxy (MbP); Factitious disorder imposed by another; Factitious disorder by proxy; Fabricated or induced illness by caregivers (FII); Medical child abuse
- Specialty: Psychiatry
- Symptoms: Variable
- Causes: Unknown
- Risk factors: Complications of pregnancy, caregiver who was abused as a child or has factitious disorder imposed on self
- Diagnostic method: Removing the child from the caregiver results in improvement, video surveillance without the knowledge of the caregiver
- Differential diagnosis: Medical disorder, other forms of child abuse, delusional disorder
- Treatment: Removal of the child, therapy
- Frequency: Estimated 1 to 30 occurrences per 1,000,000 children

Factitious disorder imposed on another (FDIA), also known as fabricated or induced illness by carers (FII) or medical child abuse, and originally named Munchausen syndrome by proxy (MSbP) after Munchausen syndrome, are terms used to describe a situation in which a caregiver creates the appearance of health problems in another person. The victim is typically the caregiver's child, but is occasionally an adult partner. The abuser may create the appearance of health issues by altering test samples, injuring the victim, falsifying diagnoses, or using contrived photographs or videos. Such "evidence" can be used to convince both the victim and others of underlying health conditions. Permanent injury (physical or psychological) or even death of the victim can occur as a result of the caretaker's actions. The behavior is generally thought to be motivated by a desire for sympathy or attention from other people, or power and control over the victim.

The causes of FDIA are generally unknown, but many physicians and mental health professionals believe that it is associated with the caregivers having experienced traumatic events during childhood (for example, parental neglect, emotional deprivation, psychological abuse, physical abuse, sexual abuse, or severe bullying). The primary motive is believed to be a desire for attention and sympathy, often with an underlying inclination to lie and manipulate others (including health professionals). Financial gain is also a motivating factor in some individuals. Common risk factors for FDIA include pregnancy related complications, past neglect or trauma, and prior diagnosis of factitious disorder imposed on self. The victims of the abuse are considered to have been subjected to a form of trauma, physical abuse, and medical neglect.

Management of FDIA in the affected 'caregiver' may require removing the affected child and putting the child into the custody of other family members or into foster care. It is not known how effective psychotherapy is for FDIA, yet it is assumed that it is likely to be highly effective for those who are able to admit they have a problem and who are willing to engage in treatment. However, psychotherapy is unlikely to be effective for an individual who lacks awareness, is incapable of recognizing their illness, or refuses to undertake treatment. The prevalence of FDIA is unknown, but it appears to be relatively rare, and its prevalence is generally higher among women. More than 90% of cases of FDIA involve a person's mother. The prognosis for the caregiver is poor. However, there is a burgeoning literature on possible courses of effective therapy. The condition was first named as "Munchausen syndrome by proxy" in 1977 by British pediatrician Roy Meadow. Some aspects of FDIA may represent criminal behavior.

== Signs and symptoms ==
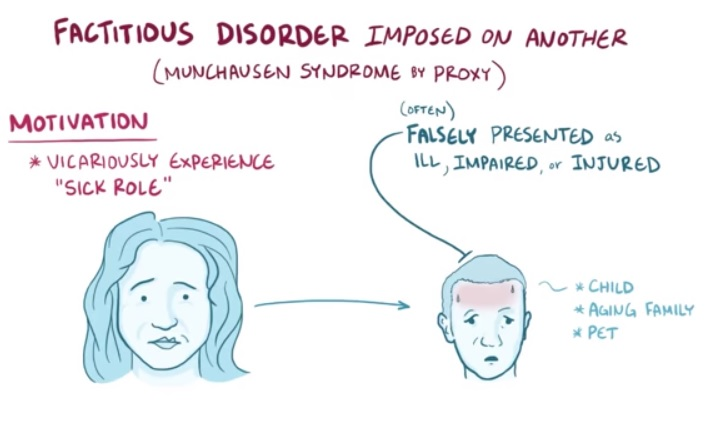
In FDIA, a caregiver is abusing a child, a vulnerable adult, or even a pet in an attempt to meet their own (unmet) emotional needs.

Factitious disorder imposed on another (FDIA) is a condition in which a caregiver falsifies, exaggerates or induces illness in a dependent and presents them as ill, presumably for some form of attention or psychological gain, and not solely motivated by external gains. The caregiver or partner systematically misrepresents various symptoms, fabricates signs, manipulates laboratory tests, manipulates clinicians and other health professionals, or purposely harms or injures the victim (e.g. by poisoning, drugging, causing infection(s), or even by causing physical injury).

Most individuals with FDIA present about three medical problems in some combination of the 103 different reported symptoms. The most-frequently reported problems are apnea (26.8% of cases), anorexia or feeding problems (24.6% of cases), diarrhea (20%), seizures (17.5%), cyanosis (blue skin) (11.7%), behavioural problems (10.4%), asthma (9.5%), allergy (9.3%), and fevers (8.6%). Other symptoms include failure to thrive, vomiting, bleeding, rash, and infections. Many of these symptoms are easy to fake because they are subjective. A parent reporting that their child had a fever in the past 24 hours is making a claim that is impossible to prove or disprove. The number and variety of presented symptoms contribute to the difficulty in reaching a proper diagnosis.

Unique to this form of abuse is that health care providers sometimes actively enable the abuse (iatrogenic harm). By reacting to the concerns and demands of perpetrators with FDIA, medical professionals can be manipulated into a partnership that continues the maltreatment of the child. Challenging cases that defy simple medical explanations may prompt health care providers to pursue unusual or rare diagnoses, thus allocating even more time to the child/victim and the abuser. If the health practitioner resists ordering further treatment, the FDIA abuser can threaten action to make the medical system appear negligent for refusing to help a sick child. Clinicians should maintain a high index of suspicion when confronted with persistent unexplained illness in a dependent, and may need to limit further invasive investigations once concern arises to avoid unnecessary or harmful medical care.

The perpetrator with FDIA continues the abuse because maintaining the child in the role of 'patient' satisfies the abuser's unmet emotional needs. Generally, the cure for the victim is to be separated completely from the abuser and to receive necessary emotional support from other loved ones and adequate treatment, such as therapy. When (or if) parental visits are later allowed, sometimes there is a disastrous outcome for the child upon encountering their abuser, especially when the child has reached an age (e.g. adolescence) whereby he or she has been made aware of what occurred to them. The impact of having a parent or caretaker with FDIA on the victim can therefore be extremely traumatic, as the child previously believed their caretaker to be a genuinely loving and trustworthy adult. The betrayal and loss of their parental figure can cause immense emotional distress. Even if one child or victim is removed from the perpetrator, the perpetrator may then seek to abuse another child or family member: a sibling or even other child who still remains in the family. This may be more likely if the perpetrator has not, or refused to, engage in mental health treatment.

Factitious disorder imposed on another can have many long-term emotional effects on a child who has been victimized. Depending on their experience of medical interventions, some children may learn that they are most likely to receive the positive parental attention they naturally crave only when they are playing the 'sick' role in front of health care providers. Several case reports describe Munchausen syndrome patients suspected of themselves having been FDIA victims. Seeking personal gratification through illness can thus become a lifelong and multi-generational disorder in some cases. In stark contrast, other reports suggest that survivors of FDIA can develop a severe avoidance of medical treatment or medical professionals, sometimes experiencing post-traumatic responses to it.

=== Caregiver ===
The adult 'caregiver' who has abused the child often seems comfortable, pleased, and generally not upset over the child's hospitalization. While the child is hospitalized, medical professionals must monitor the caregiver's visits to prevent an attempt to worsen the child's condition. In addition, in many jurisdictions, medical professionals have a duty to report such abuse to legal authorities.

Like those with factitious disorder imposed on self, FDIA perpetrators are known to frequently switch medical providers or clinics until they find a provider that is willing to diagnose and meet their level of need. This practice is often known as "doctor shopping" or "hospital hopping".

Early writings from the 1990s focused on the profile or motive of the perpetrator. However, as of the 21st century it has been recognized that these have little predictive value.

== Diagnosis ==
Use of the term "Munchausen syndrome by proxy" is discouraged. In the World Health Organization's International Statistical Classification of Diseases, 10th Revision (ICD-10), the official diagnosis is factitious disorder (301.51 in ICD-9, F68.12 in ICD-10). Within the United States, factitious disorder imposed on another (FDIA or FDIoA) was officially recognized as a disorder in 2013, while in the United Kingdom, it is known as fabricated or induced illness by carers (FII).

In DSM-5, the diagnostic manual published by the American Psychiatric Association in 2013, it is listed under 300.19 Factitious disorder. This, in turn, encompasses two types:

- Factitious Disorder Imposed on Self
- Factitious Disorder Imposed on Another (Previously Factitious Disorder by Proxy); the diagnosis is assigned to the perpetrator; the person affected may be assigned an abuse diagnosis (e.g. child abuse).

Both types include an optional specifier to identify if the observed behavior was a single episode or part of recurrent episodes.

The diagnosis of factitious disorder imposed on another (FDIA) applies when one person falsifies, induces, or fabricates illness in another individual and presents them to others, most often healthcare professionals, as ill. The diagnosis is applied to the individual performing the falsification, not to the person being presented as ill. Clinical and safeguarding sources describe the affected person typically as a dependent, such as a child or incapacitated adult, who is under the care or control of the actor. When the person producing or feigning symptoms is a competent adult acting on their own behalf, even if accompanied by or receiving support from another individual who enables or participates in the deception, FDIA does not apply; the appropriate diagnosis then is factitious disorder (self-imposed) or malingering. The deceptive behavior occurs in the absence of external incentives, distinguishing FDIA from malingering.

=== Warning signs ===
Warning signs include:

- A child who has one or more medical problems that do not respond to treatment or that follow an unusual course that is persistent, puzzling, and unexplained.
- Physical or laboratory findings that are highly unusual, discrepant with patient's presentation or history, or physically or clinically impossible.
- A parent who appears medically knowledgeable, fascinated with medical details and hospital gossip, appears to enjoy the hospital environment, and expresses interest in the details of other patients' problems.
- A highly attentive parent who is reluctant to leave their child's side and who themselves seem to require constant attention.
- A parent who appears unusually calm in the face of serious difficulties in their child's medical course while being highly supportive and encouraging of the physician, or one who is angry, devalues staff, and demands further intervention, more procedures, second opinions, and transfers to more sophisticated facilities.
- The suspected parent may work in the health-care field themselves or profess an interest in a health-related job.
- The signs and symptoms of a child's illness may lessen or simply vanish in the parent's absence (hospitalization and careful monitoring may be necessary to establish this causal relationship).
- A family history of similar or unexplained illness or death in a sibling.
- A parent with symptoms similar to their child's own medical problems or an illness history that itself is puzzling and unusual.
- A suspected emotionally distant relationship between parents; the spouse often fails to visit the patient and has little contact with physicians even when the child is hospitalized with a serious illness.
- A parent who reports dramatic, negative events, such as house fires, burglaries, or car accidents, that affect them and their family while their child is undergoing treatment.
- A parent who seems to have an insatiable need for adulation or who makes self-serving efforts for public acknowledgment of their abilities.
- A child who inexplicably deteriorates whenever discharge is planned.
- A child that looks for cueing from a parent in order to feign illness when medical personnel are present.
- A child that is overly articulate regarding medical terminology and their own disease process for their age.
- A child that presents to the Emergency Department with a history of repeat illness, injury, or hospitalization.

== Treatment ==
Management of FDIA depends on the severity; in mild cases confronting the 'caregiver' that history and findings do not match the child's clinical picture is indicated. In moderate and severe cases child protective services need to be involved, unnecessary medical care is stopped, harm repaired, and the child may need to be removed and be put into the custody of other family members or into foster care. It is not known how effective psychotherapy is for FDIA, yet it is assumed that it is likely to be highly effective for those who are able to admit they have a problem and who are willing to engage in treatment. However, it is unlikely to be effective for an individual who lacks insight into their illness, those with an extensive and persistent belief system justifying their actions, or who refuse to undertake treatment.

== Epidemiology ==
FDIA is rare. Incidence rate estimates range from 1 to 28 per million children, although some assume that it may be much more common. One study in Italy found that 4 out of more than 700 children admitted to the hospital met the criteria (0.53%). In this study, stringent diagnostic criteria were used, which required at least one test outcome or event that could not possibly have occurred without deliberate intervention by the FDIA person.

In one study, the average age of the affected individual at the time of diagnosis was four years old. Slightly over 50% were aged 24 months or younger, and 75% were under six years old. The average duration from onset of symptoms to diagnosis was 22 months. By the time of diagnosis, six percent of the affected persons were dead, mostly from apnea (a common result of smothering) or starvation, and seven percent had long-term or permanent injury. About half of the affected had siblings; 25% of the known siblings were dead, and 61% of siblings had symptoms similar to the affected or that were otherwise suspicious. The mother was the perpetrator in 76.5% of the cases, the father in 6.7%.

Studies have shown that over 90% of FDIA cases, the abuser is the mother or another female guardian or caregiver. A psychodynamic model of this kind of maternal abuse exists. Fathers and other male caregivers have been the perpetrators in seven percent of the cases studied. When they are not actively involved in the abuse, the fathers or male guardians of FDIA victims are often described as being distant, emotionally disengaged, and powerless. These men play a passive role in FDIA by being frequently absent from the home and rarely visiting the hospitalized child. Usually, they vehemently deny the possibility of abuse, even in the face of overwhelming evidence or their child's pleas for help.

== Prognosis ==
Studies have shown a mortality rate of between six and ten percent, making it perhaps the most lethal form of abuse.

== Society and culture ==
=== Terminology ===
The term "Munchausen syndrome by proxy", in the United States, has never officially been included as a distinct mental disorder by the American Psychiatric Association, which publishes the Diagnostic and Statistical Manual of Mental Disorders (DSM), now in its fifth edition. Although the DSM-III (1980) and DSM-III-R (1987) included Munchausen syndrome, they did not include MSbP. DSM-IV (1994) and DSM-IV-TR (2000) added MSbP as a proposal only, and although it was finally recognized as a disorder in DSM-5 (2013), each of the last three editions of the DSM designated it by a different name.

FDIA has been given different names in different places and at different times. What follows is a partial list of alternative names that have been either used or proposed (with approximate dates):

- Factitious Disorder Imposed on Another (current) (U.S., 2013) American Psychiatric Association, DSM-5
- Factitious Disorder by Proxy (FDP, FDbP) (proposed) (U.S., 2000) American Psychiatric Association, DSM-IV-TR
- Fictitious Disorder by Proxy (FDP, FDbP) (proposed) (U.S., 1994) American Psychiatric Association, DSM-IV
- Fabricated or Induced Illness by Carers (FII) (U.K., 2002) The Royal College of Pediatrics and Child Health
- Factitious Illness by Proxy (1996) World Health Organization
- Pediatric Condition Falsification (PCF) (proposed) (U.S., 2002) American Professional Society on the Abuse of Children proposed this term to diagnose the victim (child); the perpetrator (caregiver) would be diagnosed "factitious disorder by proxy"; MSbP would be retained as the name applied to the 'disorder' that contains these two elements, a diagnosis in the child and a diagnosis in the caretaker.
- Induced Illness (Munchausen Syndrome by Proxy) (Ireland, 1999–2002) Department of Health and Children
- Medical child abuse
- Munchausen Syndrome by Proxy (2002) Professor Roy Meadow.
- Meadow's Syndrome (1984–1987) named after Roy Meadow. This label, however, had already been in use since 1957 to describe a completely unrelated and rare form of cardiomyopathy.
- Polle Syndrome (1977–1984) coined by Burman and Stevens, from the then-common belief that Baron Münchhausen's second wife gave birth to a daughter named Polle during their marriage. The baron declared that the baby was not his, and the child died from "seizures" at the age of 10 months. The name fell out of favor after 1984, when it was discovered that Polle was not the baby's name, but rather was the name of her mother's hometown.

While it initially included only the infliction of harmful medical care, the term has subsequently been extended to include cases in which the only harm arose from medical neglect, noncompliance, or even educational interference. The term is derived from Munchausen syndrome, a psychiatric factitious disorder wherein those affected feign disease, illness, or psychological trauma to draw attention, sympathy, or reassurance to themselves. Munchausen syndrome by proxy perpetrators, by contrast, are willing to fulfill their need for positive attention by hurting their own child, thereby assuming the sick role onto their child, by proxy. These proxies then gain personal attention and support by taking on this fictitious "hero role" and receive positive attention from others, by appearing to care for and save their so-called sick child. They are named after Baron Munchausen, a literary character based on Hieronymus Karl Friedrich, Freiherr von Münchhausen (1720–1797), a German nobleman and well-known storyteller. In 1785, writer and con artist Rudolf Erich Raspe anonymously published a book in which a fictional version of "Baron Munchausen" tells fantastic and impossible stories about himself, establishing a popular literary archetype of a bombastic exaggerator.

=== Initial description, 1976 ===
"Munchausen syndrome" was first described by British endocrinologist and haematologist Richard Asher in 1951 as when someone invents or exaggerates medical symptoms, sometimes engaging in self-harm, to gain attention or sympathy and the term "Munchausen syndrome by proxy" was first coined by John Money and June Faith Werlwas in a 1976 paper titled "Folie à deux in the parents of psychosocial dwarfs: Two cases" to describe the abuse-induced and neglect-induced symptoms of the syndrome of abuse dwarfism. That same year, Sneed and Bell wrote an article titled "The Dauphin of Munchausen: factitious passage of renal stones in a child".

According to other sources, the term was created by the British pediatrician Roy Meadow in 1977. In 1977, Meadow – then professor of pediatrics at the University of Leeds, England – described the extraordinary behavior of two mothers. According to Meadow, one had poisoned her toddler with excessive quantities of salt. The other had introduced her own blood into her baby's urine sample. This second case occurred during a series of outpatient visits to the paediatric clinic of Dr. Bill Arrowsmith at Doncaster Royal Infirmary. He referred to this behavior as Munchausen syndrome by proxy (MSbP).

The medical community was initially skeptical of FDIA's existence, but it gradually gained acceptance as a recognized condition.

=== Controversy in the UK ===
During the 1990s and early 2000s, British pediatrician Roy Meadow was an expert witness in several murder cases involving MSbP/FII. Meadow was knighted for his work for child protection, though later, his reputation, and consequently the credibility of MSbP, became damaged when several convictions of child killing, in which he acted as an expert witness, including the Sally Clark case, were overturned. The mothers in those cases were wrongly convicted of murdering two or more of their children, and had already been imprisoned for up to six years.

=== Legal status ===
In most legal jurisdictions, doctors are allowed to give evidence only in regard to whether the child is being harmed. They are not allowed to give evidence in regard to the motive.

=== Australia ===
Australia established the legal precedent that FDIA does not exist as a medico-legal entity. In a June 2004 appeal hearing, the Supreme Court of Queensland, Australia, stated:

As the term factitious disorder (Munchausen's Syndrome) by proxy is merely descriptive of a behavior, not a psychiatrically identifiable illness or condition, it does not relate to an organized or recognized reliable body of knowledge or experience. Dr. Reddan's evidence was inadmissible.

The Queensland Supreme Court further ruled that the determination of whether or not a defendant had caused intentional harm to a child was a matter for the jury to decide and not for the determination by expert witnesses:

The diagnosis of Doctors Pincus, Withers, and O'Loughlin that the appellant intentionally caused her children to receive unnecessary treatment through her own acts and the false reporting of symptoms of the factitious disorder (Munchausen Syndrome) by proxy is not a diagnosis of a recognized medical condition, disorder, or syndrome. It is simply placing her within the medical term used in the category of people exhibiting such behavior. In that sense, their opinions were not expert evidence because they related to matters that could be decided on the evidence by ordinary jurors. The essential issue as to whether the appellant reported or fabricated false symptoms or did acts to intentionally cause unnecessary medical procedures to injure her children was a matter for the jury's determination. The evidence of Doctors Pincus, Withers, and O'Loughlin that the appellant was exhibiting the behavior of factitious disorder (Munchausen syndrome by proxy) should have been excluded.

Principles of law and implications for legal processes that may be deduced from these findings are that:

- Any matters brought before a court of law should be determined by the facts, not by suppositions attached to a label describing a behavior, i.e., MSBP/FII/FDBP.
- MSBP/FII/FDBP is not a mental disorder (i.e., not defined as such in DSM IV), and the evidence of a psychiatrist should not therefore be admissible.
- MSBP/FII/FDBP has been stated to be a behavior describing a form of child abuse and not a medical diagnosis of either a parent or a child. A medical practitioner cannot therefore state that a person "suffers" from MSBP/FII/FDBP, and such evidence should also therefore be inadmissible. The evidence of a medical practitioner should be confined to what they observed and heard and what forensic information was found by recognized medical investigative procedures.
- A label used to describe a behavior is not helpful in determining guilt and is prejudicial. Applying an ambiguous label of MSBP/FII to a woman is implying guilt without factual supportive and corroborative evidence.
- The assertion that other people may behave in this way, i.e., fabricate and/or induce illness in children to gain attention for themselves (FII/MSBP/FDBY), contained within the label is not factual evidence that this individual has behaved in this way. Again therefore, the application of the label is prejudicial to fairness and a finding based on fact.

In his book Playing Sick (2004), Marc Feldman notes that such findings have been in the minority among U.S. and even Australian courts. Pediatricians and other physicians have banded together to oppose limitations on child-abuse professionals whose work includes FII detection. The April 2007 issue of the journal Pediatrics specifically mentions Meadow as an individual who has been inappropriately maligned.

In the context of child protection (a child being removed from the custody of a parent), the Australian state of New South Wales uses a "on the balance of probabilities" test, rather than a "beyond reasonable doubt" test. Therefore, in the case The Secretary, Department of Family and Community Services and the Harper Children [2016] NSWChC 3, the expert testimony of Professor David Isaacs that a certain blood test result was "highly unlikely" to occur naturally or accidentally (without any speculation about motive) was sufficient to refuse the return of the affected child and his younger siblings to the mother. The children had initially been removed from the mother's custody after the blood test results became known. The fact that the affected child quickly improved both medically and behaviourly after being removed was also a factor.

=== England and Wales ===
The Queensland judgment was adopted into English law in the High Court of Justice by judge Ernest Ryder.

=== Notable cases ===
Beverley Allitt, a British nurse who murdered four children and injured a further nine in 1991 at Grantham and Kesteven Hospital, Lincolnshire, was diagnosed with Munchausen syndrome by proxy.

Wendi Michelle Scott is a Frederick, Maryland, mother who was charged with sickening her four-year-old daughter.

The book Sickened, by Julie Gregory, details her life growing up with a mother who had Munchausen by proxy, who took her to various doctors, coached her to act sicker than she was and to exaggerate her symptoms, and who demanded increasingly invasive procedures to diagnose Gregory's enforced imaginary illnesses.

Lisa Hayden-Johnson of Devon was jailed for three years and three months after subjecting her son to a total of 325 medical actions – including being forced to use a wheelchair and being fed through a tube in his stomach. She claimed her son had a long list of illnesses including diabetes, food allergies, cerebral palsy, and cystic fibrosis, describing him as "the most ill child in Britain" and receiving numerous cash donations and charity gifts, including two cruises.

In the mid-1990s, Kathy Bush gained public sympathy for the plight of her daughter, Jennifer, who by the age of 8 had undergone 40 surgeries and spent over 640 days in hospitals for gastrointestinal disorders. The acclaim led to a visit with first lady Hillary Clinton, who championed Bush's plight as evidence of need for medical reform. However, in 1996, Kathy Bush was arrested and charged with child abuse and Medicaid fraud, accused of sabotaging Jennifer's medical equipment and drugs to agitate and prolong her illness. Jennifer was moved to foster care where she quickly regained her health. The prosecutors claimed Kathy was driven by Munchausen syndrome by proxy, and she was convicted to a five-year sentence in 1999. Kathy was released after serving three years in 2005, always maintaining her innocence, and having gotten back in contact with Jennifer via correspondence.

In 2014, 26-year-old Lacey Spears was charged in Westchester County, New York, with second-degree depraved murder and first-degree manslaughter. She fed her son dangerous amounts of salt after she conducted research on the Internet about its effects. Her actions were allegedly motivated by the social media attention she gained on Facebook, Twitter, and blogs. She was convicted of second-degree murder on March 2, 2015, and sentenced to 20 years to life in prison.

Dee Dee Blanchard was a Missouri mother who was murdered by her daughter and daughter's boyfriend in 2015 after having claimed for years that her daughter, Gypsy Rose, was sick and disabled. The elder Blanchard regularly shaved Gypsy Rose's head, made her use a wheelchair in public, and subjected her to unnecessary medication and surgery. In media interviews as an outside commentator, psychiatrist Marc Feldman described the case as "unprecedented" in his experience. The case was shown on HBO's documentary film Mommy Dead and Dearest and is featured in the Hulu limited series The Act. Gypsy Rose pleaded guilty to second-degree murder and received a ten-year sentence; her boyfriend was convicted of first-degree murder and sentenced to life in prison without parole. Gypsy Rose was released on parole in December 2023.

Rapper Eminem has spoken about how his mother would frequently take him to hospitals to receive treatment for illnesses that he did not have. His song "Cleanin' Out My Closet" includes a lyric regarding the illness, "...going through public housing systems victim of Münchausen syndrome. My whole life I was made to believe I was sick, when I wasn't 'til I grew up now I blew up..." His mother's illness resulted in Eminem receiving custody of his younger brother, Nathan.

In 2013, when Justina Pelletier was 14, her parents took her to the emergency room at Boston Children's Hospital where doctors diagnosed her problems as psychiatric, but when her parents rejected the diagnosis and attempted to have her released, the hospital filed a report with Massachusetts Department of Children and Families alleging medical child abuse. This resulted in her being housed for 18 months in the psychiatric hospital, with her parents having limited access, until a judge ordered her returned to her parents. In 2016, her parents sued Boston Children's for medical malpractice, alleging that their civil rights were violated. At the trial, Pelletier's treating neurologist stated that several of her doctors suspected factitious disorder by proxy, and wanted her parents to stop encouraging her to be sick. Her parents lost the lawsuit, with one juror stating that Pelletier's parents thought of psychiatry as "psychological baloney".

Megan Bhari (1996/7–2018) and her mother had formed a charity, Believe in Magic, to help ill children based on the claim that Megan had a brain tumor. An inquest after her death found no morphological abnormalities in her brain. Kingston Adult Safeguarding Board carried out a review following her death and concluded that this was a case of FII.

== Directed towards animals ==
Medical literature describes a subset of FDIA caregivers, where the proxy is a pet rather than another human. These cases are labeled Munchausen syndrome by proxy: pet (MSbP:P). In these cases, pet owners correspond to caregivers in traditional FDIA presentations involving human proxies. No extensive survey has yet been made of the extant literature, and there has been no speculation as to how closely FDIA:P tracks with human FDIA.

== See also ==
- List of Munchausen by proxy cases
- Folie à deux
- Hypochondria
- Iatrogenesis
- Munchausen by Internet
- Psychosomatic illness
- Everything, Everything (novel)
- Sharp Objects
- Ma (2019 film)
- Run (2020 American film)
