= Peripartum cardiomyopathy =

- Other names: Post-partum cardiomyopathy
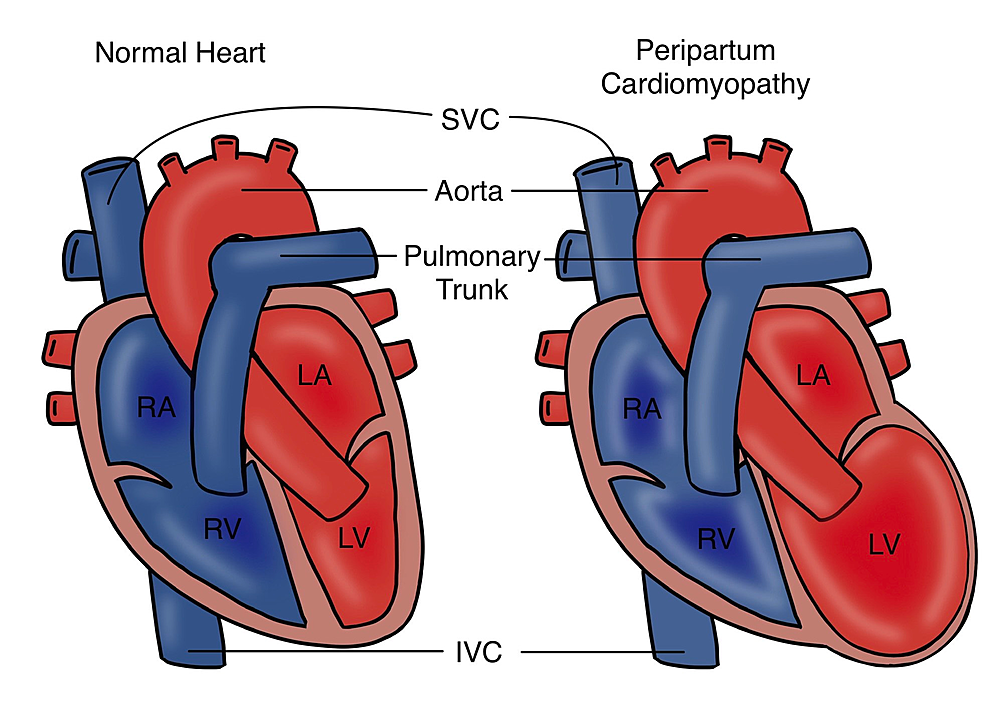
- Specialty: Obstetrics & Gynecology, Cardiology
- Symptoms: orthopnea, swollen ankles or feet, cough, chest pain, palpitations, fatigue
- Complications: Thromboembolic events, Cardiogenic Shock
- Usual onset: In the last month of pregnancy or up to 5 months postpartum
- Duration: Varies
- Risk factors: Maternal age 35+; high blood pressure; multiple gestations
- Differential diagnosis: Takotsubo Cardiomyopathy, Familial Cardiomyopathy, Pre-existing Cardiomyopathy, Valvular Heart Disease, Congenital Heart Disease

Peripartum cardiomyopathy (PPCM), sometimes referred to as Post-partum cardiomyopathy, is a form of dilated cardiomyopathy that is defined as a deterioration in cardiac function presenting typically between the last month of pregnancy and up to six months postpartum. As with other forms of dilated cardiomyopathy, PPCM involves systolic dysfunction of the heart with a decrease of the left ventricular ejection fraction (EF) with associated congestive heart failure and an increased risk of atrial and ventricular arrhythmias, thromboembolism (blockage of a blood vessel by a blood clot), and even sudden cardiac death. In essence, the heart muscle cannot contract forcefully enough to pump adequate amounts of blood for the needs of the body's vital organs.

PPCM is a diagnosis of exclusion, wherein patients have no prior history of heart disease and there are no other known possible causes of heart failure. Echocardiography is used to both diagnose and monitor the effectiveness of treatment for PPCM.

The cause of PPCM is unknown. Currently, researchers are investigating cardiotropic viruses, autoimmunity or immune system dysfunction, other toxins that serve as triggers to immune system dysfunction, micronutrient or trace mineral deficiencies, and genetics as possible components that contribute to or cause the development of PPCM. There is a relation with eclampsia and hypertension during pregnancy.

The process of PPCM begins with an unknown trigger (possibly a cardiotropic virus or other yet unidentified catalyst) that initiates an inflammatory process in the heart. Consequently, heart muscle cells are damaged; some die or become scar tissue. Scar tissue has no ability to contract; therefore, the effectiveness of the pumping action of the heart is decreased. Also, damage to the cytoskeletal framework of the heart causes the heart to enlarge, stretch or alter in shape, also decreasing the heart's systolic function or output. The initial inflammatory process appears to cause an autoimmune or immune dysfunctional process, which in turn fuels the initial inflammatory process. Progressive loss of heart muscle cells leads to eventual heart failure.

There has been increased research into the "toxic hormonal environment" that generates in late pregnancy as a contributor to the development of PPCM. Prolactin levels increase during late pregnancy and in the six weeks following birth. The 16 kilodalton N-terminal fragment of prolactin hormone has been implicated to have a causal role in genetically susceptible individuals. Thus, therapeutic interventions that block the prolactin pathway and prevent the generation of this fragment are being investigated as potential treatments to stop disease progression in PPCM.

Special considerations should be made for delivery when PPCM diagnosis is made before birth. A multi-disciplinary team should be assembled including experts in obstetrics, cardiology, maternal fetal medicine, and anesthesiology. Stable patients can be delivered vaginally unless there are other obstetric reasons for cesarean section. Attempts to stabilize the mother to delay birth and minimize potential complications of premature birth is a reasonable strategy. Following delivery, due to the increase in venous return, patients need to be closely monitored for fluid overload and pulmonary edema.

== Signs and symptoms ==
Symptoms usually include one or more of the following: orthopnea (difficulty breathing while lying flat), dyspnea (shortness of breath) on exertion, pitting edema (swelling), cough, frequent night-time urination, excessive weight gain during the last month of pregnancy (1-2+ kg/week; two to four or more pounds per week), palpitations (sensation of racing heart-rate, skipping beats, long pauses between beats, or fluttering), chest pain or tightness, fatigue and light-headedness.

The shortness of breath is often described by PPCM patients as the inability to take a deep or full breath or to get enough air into the lungs. Also, patients often describe the need to prop themselves up overnight by using two or more pillows in order to breathe better. These symptoms, swelling, and/or cough may be indications of pulmonary edema (fluid in the lungs) resulting from acute heart failure and PPCM.

Physical examination may reveal jugular venous distention, displaced apical impulse, a third heart sound, murmur consistent with mitral regurgitation, tachypnea, tachycardia, pulmonary rales, and peripheral edema.

Diagnosis may be delayed or dismissed as early symptoms may be interpreted as being typical of normal pregnancy. Delays in diagnosis and treatment of PPCM are associated with increased morbidity and mortality.

It is also quite common for women to present with evidence of having an embolus (clot) passing from the heart to a vital organ, causing such complications as stroke, loss of circulation to a limb, even coronary artery occlusion (blockage) with typical myocardial infarction (heart attack).

Peripartum cardiomyopathy is now a leading cause of maternal death in many parts of the United States and around the world. Approximately 60% of cases of cardiogenic shock during pregnancy or in the early postpartum period are caused by peripartum cardiomyopathy.

For these reasons, it is paramount that clinicians hold a high suspicion of PPCM in any peri- or postpartum patient where unusual or unexplained symptoms or presentations occur.

== Diagnosis ==
The following screening tool may be useful to patients and medical professionals in determining the need to take further action to diagnose symptoms:

Focused medical history for PPCM screening, looking for early symptoms of heart failure, during last month of pregnancy:
1. Orthopnea (difficulty breathing while lying flat):
a.) None = 0 points;
b.) Need to elevate head = 1 point;
c.) Need to elevate upper body 45° or more = 2 points
2. Dyspnea (shortness of breath) on exertion:
a.) None = 0 points;
b.) Climbing 8 or more steps = 1 point;
c.) Walking on level = 2 points
3. Unexplained cough:
a.) None = 0 points;
b.) Night-time = 1 point;
c.) Day and night = 2 points
4. Swelling (pitting edema) lower extremities:
a.) None = 0 points;
b.) Below knee = 1 point;
c.) Above and below knee and/or hands/face = 2 points.
5. Excessive weight gain during last month of pregnancy:
a.) Under 2 pounds per week = 0 points;
b.) 2 to 4 pounds per week = 1 point;
c.) over 4 pounds per week = 2 points.
6. Palpitations (sensation of irregular heart beats):
a.) None = 0 points;
b.) When lying down at night = 1 point;
c.) Day and night, any position = 2 points
Scoring and Action:
0 – 2 = low risk — continue observation
3 – 4 = mild risk — consider doing blood BNP and CRP; echocardiogram if BNP and CRP are elevated
5 or more = high risk — do blood BNP, CRP, and echocardiogram

Initial evaluation should include blood work. PPCM is a diagnosis of exclusion, meaning that other conditions need to be evaluated and ruled out before this diagnosis will be used. Anemia, electrolyte abnormalities, thyroid dysfunction, and renal or liver dysfunction need to be ruled out. Further testing can also include a chest x-ray, brain natriuretic peptide levels (which are usually elevated), EKG, echocardiogram, cardiac MRI, and cardiac catheterization. There is no specific test to get a diagnosis of PPCM.

Genetic testing is indicated in mothers who have peripartum cardiomyopathy to possibly identify pathogenic genetic variants that predispose one to heart failure in pregnancy and allow other family members to be screened if such pathogenic variants exist.

=== Ultrasound ===
An echocardiography (or an ultrasound of the heart) is the initial diagnostic test of choice in evaluating peripartum cardiomyopathy. The echocardiogram shows reduced systolic function and often left ventricular dilation.

Ultrasound of peripartum cardiomyopathy

Ultrasound of peripartum cardiomyopathy

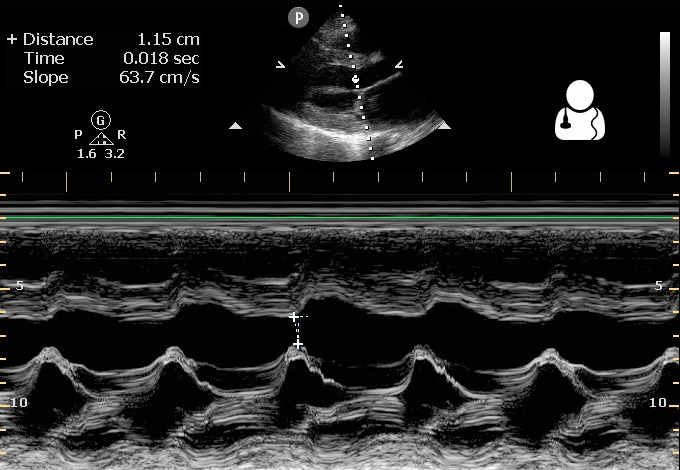
Ultrasound of peripartum cardiomyopathy

== Treatment ==
Early detection and treatment are associated with higher rates of recovery and decreased morbidity and mortality.

Treatment for PPCM is similar to treatment for congestive heart failure. Conventional heart failure treatment includes the use of diuretics, beta blockers (B-B), and angiotensin-converting enzyme inhibitors (ACE-I) after delivery. Diuretics, preferably furosemide, help the body to get rid of excess water weight and also lower blood pressure. Fluid restriction is also used to help limit excess water in the body. Using diuretics during pregnancy needs to be done carefully, as diuretics can impair blood flow to the placenta which could potentially cause harm to the fetus. Hydrochlorothiazide and furosemide are safe during pregnancy and breastfeeding. ACE-I and B-B improve blood circulation and contribute to the reversal of the immune system dysfunction associated with PPCM. If ACE-I is not well tolerated by the patient, it can be replaced by angiotensin receptor blockers (ARB). ACE-I and ARBs are contraindicated during pregnancy and breastfeeding, but can be used during the postpartum period as long as breastfeeding is not occurring. Hydralazine with nitrates may replace ACE-I in breastfeeding mothers or before delivery; however, evidence suggests that this course of treatment may not be as effective as ACE-I but beneficial when necessary.

If EF is less than 35%, anticoagulation is indicated, as there is a greater risk of developing left ventricular thrombi (blood clots). Sometimes implantation of a left ventricular assist device (LVAD) or even heart transplant also becomes necessary.

It is important that the patient receives regular follow-up care including frequent echocardiograms to monitor improvement or the lack thereof, particularly after changes of medical treatment regimes.

Patients who do not respond to initial treatment, defined as left ventricular EF remaining below 20% at two months or below 40% at three months with conventional treatment may merit further investigation, including cardiac magnetic resonance imaging (MRI), cardiac catheterization, and endomyocardial biopsy for special staining and for viral polymerase chain reaction (PCR) analysis. Antiviral therapy, immunoabsorption, intravenous gamma globulin, or other immunomodulation therapy may then be considered accordingly, but following a controlled research-type protocol.

Since no one knows for sure exactly when to discontinue treatment, even when recovery occurs quickly, it is still recommended that both ACE-I and B-B be continued for at least one year after diagnosis. When considering discontinuing heart failure medications, they should be weaned gradually over time and patients should be closely monitored during this time.

PPCM patients have an increased risk for sudden death and it is seen that they benefit from implantable cardioverter defibrillator (ICD) and cardiac resynchronization therapy to prevent sudden cardiac death. However, in view of reversible cardiomyopathy, sometimes Implantable cardioverter-defibrillator (ICD) or Cardiac resynchronization therapy (CRT) are not routinely used and reserved for severe LV dysfunction or high risk cases.

Bromocriptine is being studied as another potential treatment option, due to its interference with the prolactin pathway which may cause PPCM for some people. Several studies have shown bromocriptine in addition to standard heart failure medications produce better outcomes in terms of both overall recovery and rate of recovery.

== Prognosis ==
The most recent studies indicate that with newer conventional heart failure treatment consisting of diuretics, ACE inhibitors and beta blockers, the survival rate is very high at 98% or better, and almost all PPCM patients improve with treatment. In the United States, over 50% of PPCM patients experience complete recovery of heart function (EF 55% or greater). Almost all recovered patients are eventually able to discontinue medications with no resulting relapse and have normal life expectancy.

It is a misconception that hope for recovery depends upon improvement or recovery within the first six to 12 months of diagnosis. Many women continue to improve or recover even years after diagnosis with continued medicinal treatment. Once fully recovered, if there is no subsequent pregnancy, the possibility of relapse or recurrence of heart failure is minimal.

Subsequent pregnancy should be avoided when left ventricular function has not recovered and the EF is lower than 55%. However, many women who have fully recovered from PPCM have gone on to have successful subsequent pregnancies. A significant study reports that the risk for recurrence of heart failure in recovered PPCM patients as a result of subsequent pregnancy is approximately 21% or better. The chance of relapse may be even smaller for those with normal contractile reserve as demonstrated by stress echocardiography. In any subsequent pregnancy, careful monitoring is necessary. A stress test or echocardiogram should be complete prior to a subsequent pregnancy. Where relapse occurs, conventional treatment should be resumed, including hydralazine with nitrates plus beta-blockers during pregnancy, or ACE-inhibitors plus beta-blockers following pregnancy.

Some factors that are associated with a better prognosis are small left ventricle diastolic dimension, LVEF greater than 30-35% at time of diagnosis, absence of troponin elevation, absence of LV thrombus, non-African American ethnicity. Some factors that indicate a poor prognosis are a QRS greater than 120 milliseconds, a delay in diagnosis, high NYHA class, multiparity, African descent.

Mortality estimates have significant differences depending on the racial group being studied, the geographical location, and the length of follow-up in the study. At 1 year follow-up in the United States, mortality rates range from 4%-11%.

== Epidemiology ==
It is estimated that the incidence of PPCM in the United States is between 1 in 1300 to 4000 live births. While it can affect women of all races, it is more prevalent in some countries; for example, estimates suggest that PPCM occurs at rates of one in 1000 live births in South African Bantus, and as high as one in 300 in Haiti.

Some studies assert that PPCM may be slightly more prevalent among older women who have had higher numbers of liveborn children and among women of older and younger extremes of childbearing age. However, a quarter to a third of PPCM patients are young women who have given birth for the first time.

While the use of tocolytic agents or the development of preeclampsia (toxemia of pregnancy) and pregnancy-induced hypertension (PIH) may contribute to the worsening of heart failure, they do not cause PPCM; the majority of women have developed PPCM who neither received tocolytics nor had preeclampsia nor PIH.

When looking at the occurrence of PPCM worldwide, the incidence of PPCM is well correlated with maternal mortality rates. This means that in areas with higher maternal mortality, there are also higher rates of PPCM. This suggests that the level of perinatal care may impact the incidence of PPCM.

In short, PPCM can occur in any woman of any racial background, at any age during reproductive years, and in any pregnancy.
