= Gypsy Rose: Life After Lock Up =

American reality television docuseries

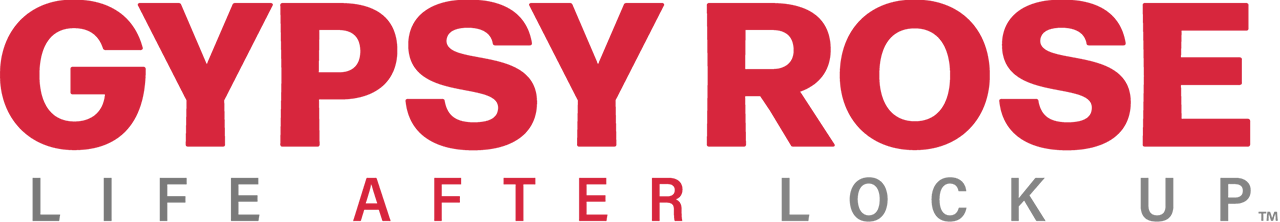
- Genre: Reality television; Docuseries
- Based on: Murder of Dee Dee Blanchard
- Starring: Gypsy-Rose Blanchard
- Country of origin: United States
- Original language: English
- No. of seasons: 2

Production
- Executive producers: Brie Miranda Bryant; Nicole Vogel; Sharon Scott; Laura Fleury; Leane Vandeman; Cerise Fukuji; Melissa G. Moore
- Production company: A+E Networks

Original release
- Network: Lifetime
- Release: June 3, 2024 – present

Gypsy Rose: Life After Lock Up is an American reality true crime television docuseries that premiered on Lifetime on June 3, 2024. The series follows Gypsy Rose Blanchard after her release from prison for the murder of her mother Dee Dee Blanchard, documenting her reintegration into society, personal relationships, and public life.

The season covers events like her finalized divorce from Ryan Anderson, her reconnection with Ken Urker, and the birth of their daughter Aurora, who arrived early in December 2024. The series was renewed for a second season, which was released on March 10, 2025.

== Premise ==
The series chronicles Blanchard's adjustment to life after serving more than eight years in prison for her role in the 2015 killing of her mother, Dee Dee Blanchard. Cameras follow her as she navigates marriage, divorce, rekindled relationships, internet attention, and motherhood.

== Appearing in documentary ==
- Gypsy Rose Blanchard
- Kristy Blanchard
- Ryan Anderson
- Rod Blanchard
- Mia Blanchard
- Ken Urker
- Jeffrey J. Joseph

== Background ==
Dee Dee fabricated illnesses, forced Gypsy to use a wheelchair, and subjected her to unnecessary medical treatments and surgeries. This abuse continued until Gypsy and her then-boyfriend, Nicholas Godejohn, conspired to kill Dee Dee in 2015. The case garnered widespread media attention and became the subject of multiple documentaries, including HBO's Mommy Dead and Dearest and the dramatized Hulu series The Act (2019).

Gypsy pleaded guilty to second-degree murder and was sentenced to 10 years in prison. Nicholas Godejohn was convicted of first-degree murder and sentenced to life in prison. Throughout her time in prison, Gypsy expressed relief at being freed from her mother's control, and her story sparked debates around the complexities of abuse, coercion, and justice.

== Production ==
The series was produced by A+E Factual Studios (Category 6 Media), a documentary and reality-focused division of A+E Networks. The production team included Brie Miranda Bryant and Nicole Vogel as executive producers for Lifetime, alongside Sharon Scott, Laura Fleury, Leane Vandeman, Cerise Fukuji, and Melissa G. Moore serving as executive producers through A+E Factual Studios/Category 6 Media.

The show was developed and produced by Lifetime as part of its continuing slate of true-crime and reality programming. Season one premiered in June 2024 with six episodes, drawing considerable media attention due to Blanchard's prominence.

Following its ratings success, Lifetime renewed the series for a second season. Season two premiered on March 10, 2025, with eight episodes airing weekly on Mondays at 9 p.m. ET/PT. A special titled Gypsy Rose: Life After Lock Up: The Unseen Footage aired prior to the premiere.

== Series overview ==
Season	Episodes	Originally released	
Season	Episodes	First released	Last released
1	8	June 3, 2024	July 22, 2024
2	11	March 10, 2025	May 19, 2025

== Episodes ==
=== Season 1 (2024) ===
Premiered on June 3, 2024, the debut season focused on Blanchard's initial release, her marriage to Ryan Anderson, and the challenges of adjusting to public life.

No. overall	No. in season	Title	Original release date
1	1	"So This Is Freedom?"	June 3, 2024
2	2	"Independence is Scary"	June 10, 2024
3	3	"Is This My Life?"	June 17, 2024
4	4	"Ghosts of the Past"	June 24, 2024
5	5	"You Told the World"	July 1, 2024
6	6	"I Don't Want to Be Me"	July 8, 2024
7	7	"Are You Happy?"	July 15, 2024
8	8	"Starting Over... Again"	July 22, 2024

=== Season 2 (2025) ===
Premiered on March 10, 2025. This season covers Blanchard's divorce from Anderson, her renewed relationship with Ken Urker, her pregnancy, and the birth of their daughter Aurora in December 2024.

No. overall	No. in season	Title	Original release date
9	1	"Pregnant on Parole"	March 10, 2025
10	2	"Your House or Mine?"	March 17, 2025
11	3	"My Life Is a Circus"	March 24, 2025
12	4	"Who's the Daddy?"	March 31, 2025
13	5	"And the Father Is..."	April 7, 2025
14	6	"Baby Shower or Breakup"	April 14, 2025
15	7	"I'll See You in Divorce Court"	April 21, 2024
16	8	"The Bumpy Road Ahead"	April 26, 2025
17	9	"A Baby for Christmas?"	May 5, 2025
18	10	"I'm Not a Monster"	May 12, 2025
19	11	"The Ultimatum"	May 19, 2025

== Reception ==
The series received mixed critical responses. Some reviewers praised its candid look at reentry after incarceration, while others questioned Lifetime's focus on sensational aspects of Blanchard's story.

=== Critical response ===
Gypsy Rose: Life After Lock Up received mixed reviews from critics. On Variety Aramide Tinubu praised the compelling nature of the subject and Gypsy Rose Blanchard's presence, describing her as "a compelling subject" whose notoriety made the series watchable. Decider expressed unease about the program's voyeuristic elements, though acknowledged curiosity about Blanchard's post-prison transition.

=== Survivor and advocacy perspectives ===
Some survivors of abuse and advocacy voices criticized the series for glamorizing Blanchard's story and sidelining the perspectives of others affected. One review by Melissa Camacho of Common Sense Media described the program as "traumatic, triggering, disturbing…and frankly, disgusting," arguing that Lifetime prioritized sensationalism over responsibility.

=== Public response to episodes ===
Individual episodes sparked wider public discussion. In the first season, Blanchard revealed she received numerous death threats shortly after gaining access to social media, highlighting the difficulties of instant notoriety. The second-season finale, which depicted tensions and eventual reconciliation between Blanchard and her partner Ken Urker during her pregnancy, was widely covered in entertainment outlets.
