= 77th Golden Globe Awards =

Film award ceremony in 2020

- Official poster
- Date: January 5, 2020
- Site: The Beverly Hilton, Beverly Hills, California, U.S.
- Hosted by: Ricky Gervais
- Directed by: Louis J. Horvitz

Highlights
- Best Film: Drama: 1917
- Best Film: Musical or Comedy: Once Upon a Time in Hollywood
- Best Drama Series: Succession
- Best Musical or Comedy Series: Fleabag
- Best Miniseries or Television movie: Chernobyl
- Most awards: Once Upon a Time in Hollywood (3)
- Most nominations: Marriage Story (6)

Television coverage
- Network: NBC
- Ratings: 18.3 million (Nielsen ratings)

The 77th Golden Globe Awards honored the best in film and American television of 2019, as chosen by the Hollywood Foreign Press Association. Produced by Dick Clark Productions and the HFPA, the ceremony was broadcast live on January 5, 2020, from The Beverly Hilton in Beverly Hills, California beginning at 5:00 p.m. PST / 8:00 p.m. EST. The ceremony aired live on NBC in the United States. Ricky Gervais hosted the ceremony for the fifth and "final" time.

The nominees were announced on December 9, 2019, by Tim Allen, Dakota Fanning and Susan Kelechi Watson. Marriage Story earned a leading six nominations. Tom Hanks and Ellen DeGeneres were announced as the recipients of the Cecil B. DeMille Award and the Carol Burnett Award, respectively.

Once Upon a Time in Hollywood won the most awards for the ceremony with three, including Best Motion Picture – Musical or Comedy. 1917, Joker, and Rocketman won two awards each, with 1917 winning Best Motion Picture – Drama. For television, Chernobyl, Fleabag and Succession were the most awarded, with two wins each.

The ceremony was nominated for two Primetime Emmy Awards (Outstanding Variety Special (Live) and Outstanding Production Design for a Variety Special).

== Winners and nominees ==
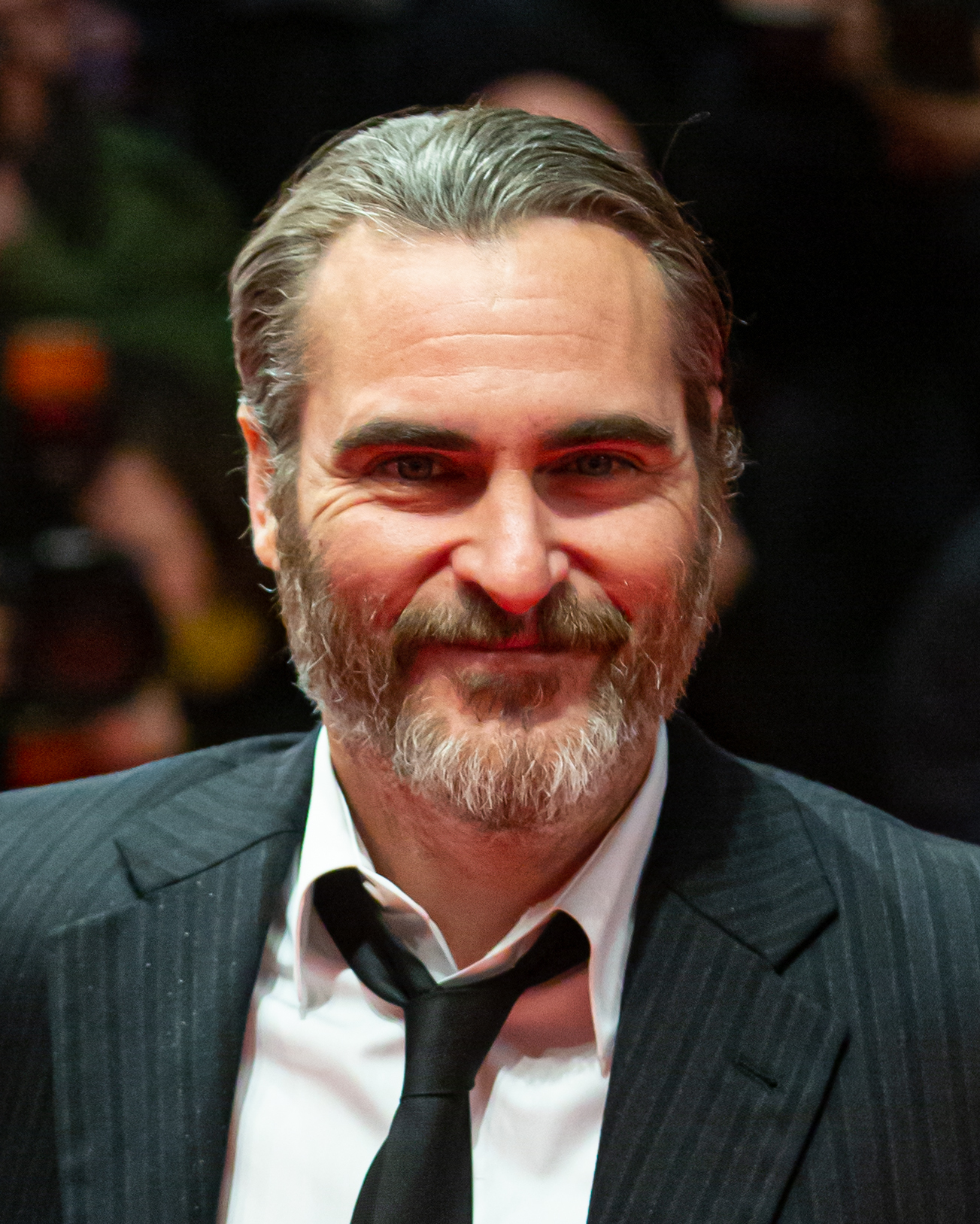
Joaquin Phoenix, Best Actor in a Motion Picture – Drama winner

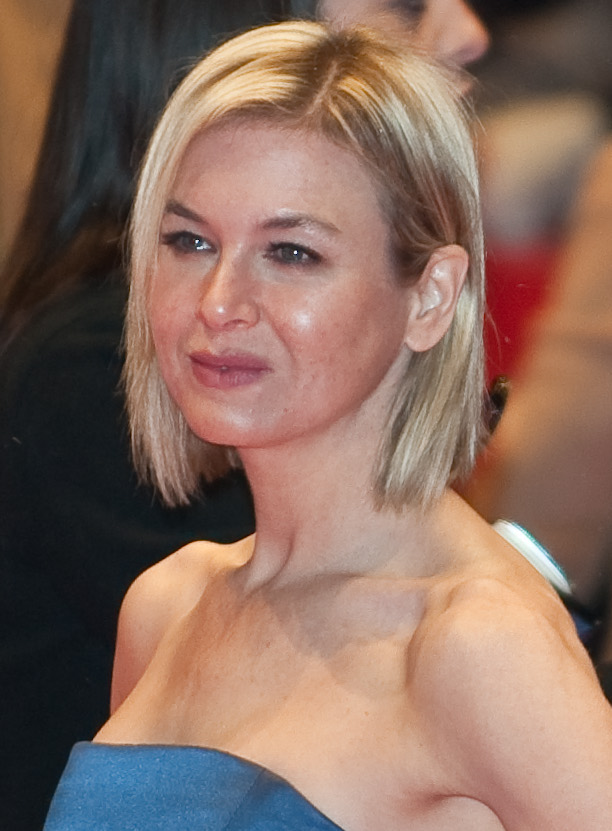
Renée Zellweger, Best Actress in a Motion Picture – Drama winner

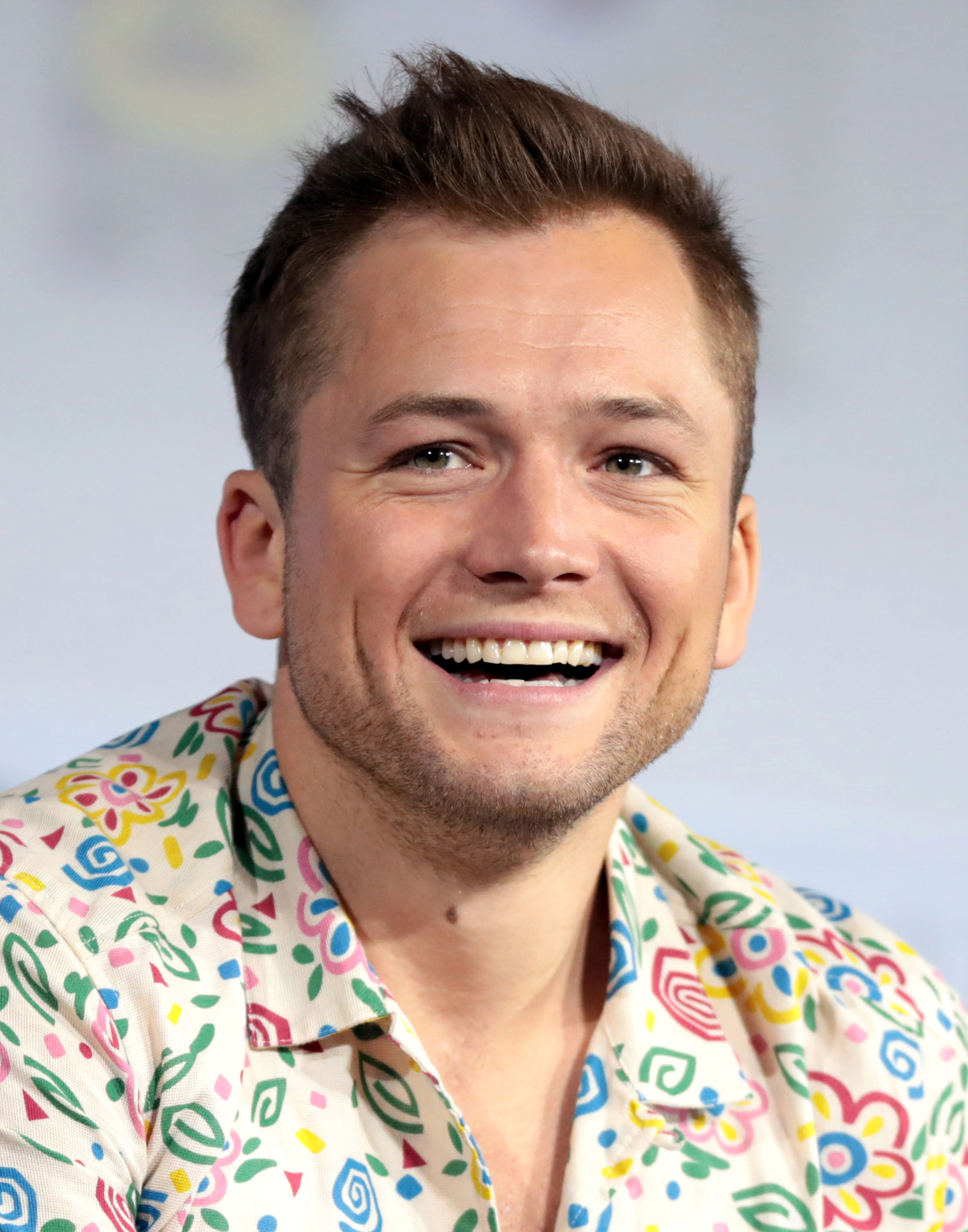
Taron Egerton, Best Actor in a Motion Picture – Musical or Comedy winner

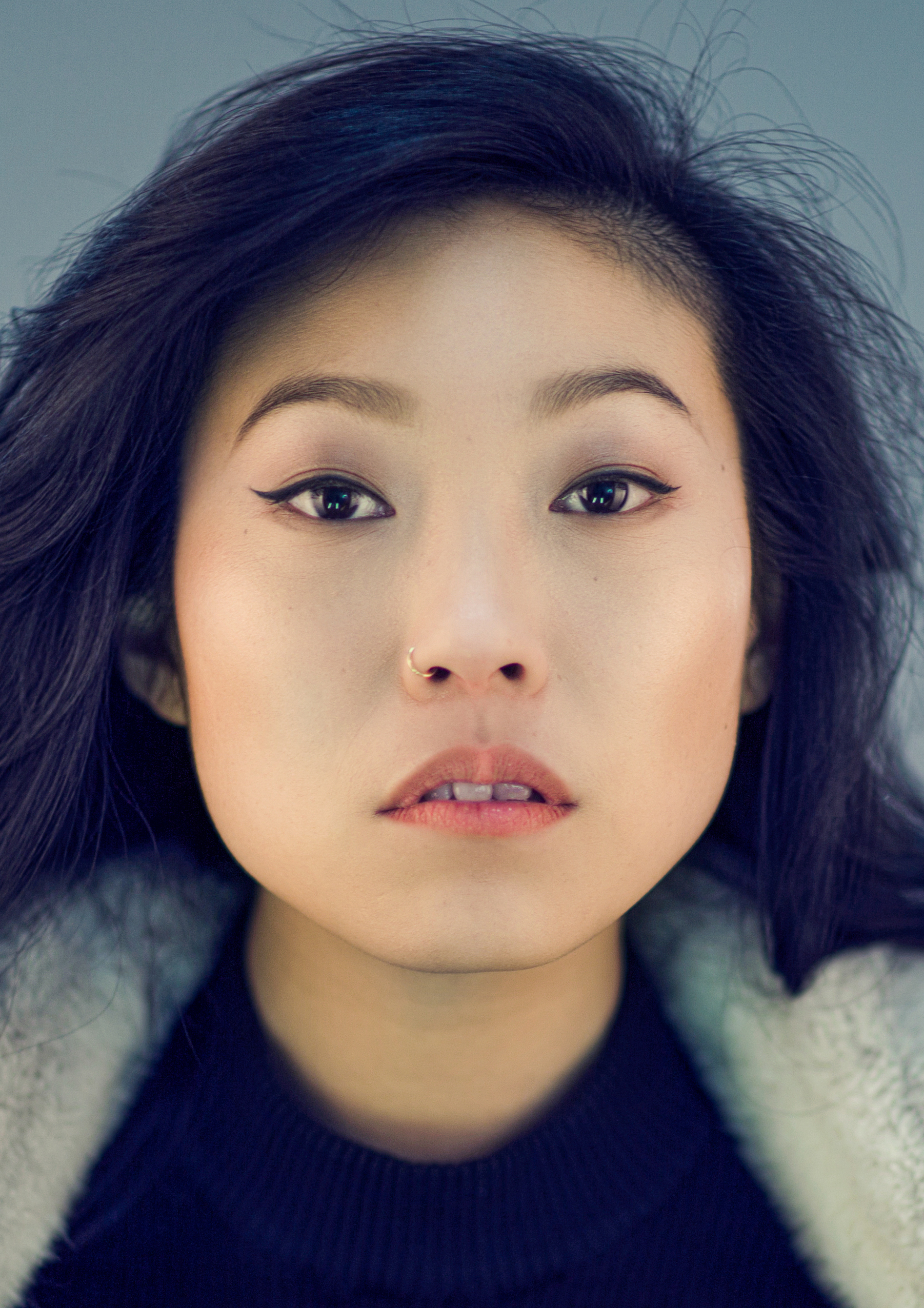
Awkwafina, Best Actress in a Motion Picture – Musical or Comedy winner

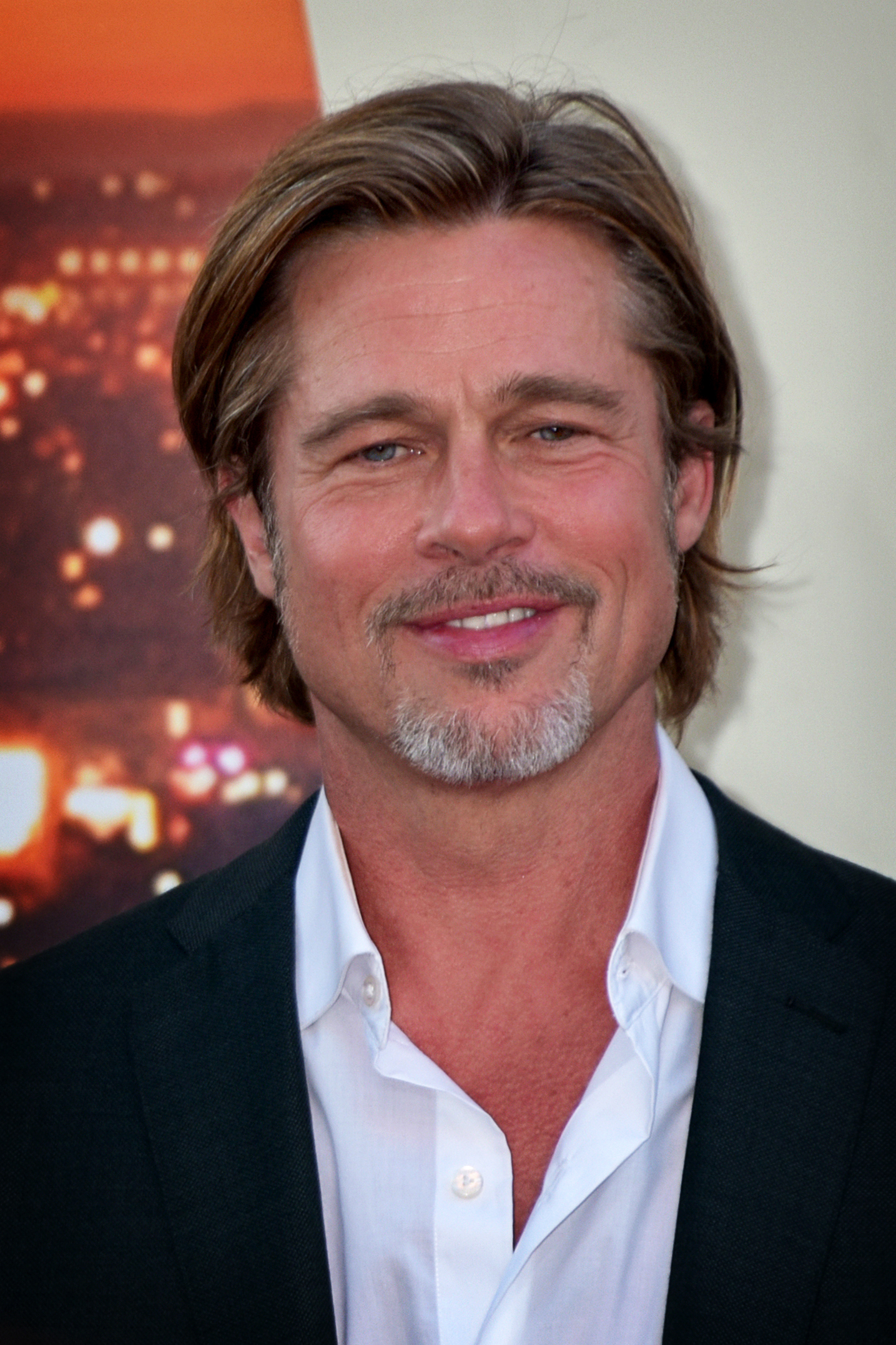
Brad Pitt, Best Supporting Actor winner

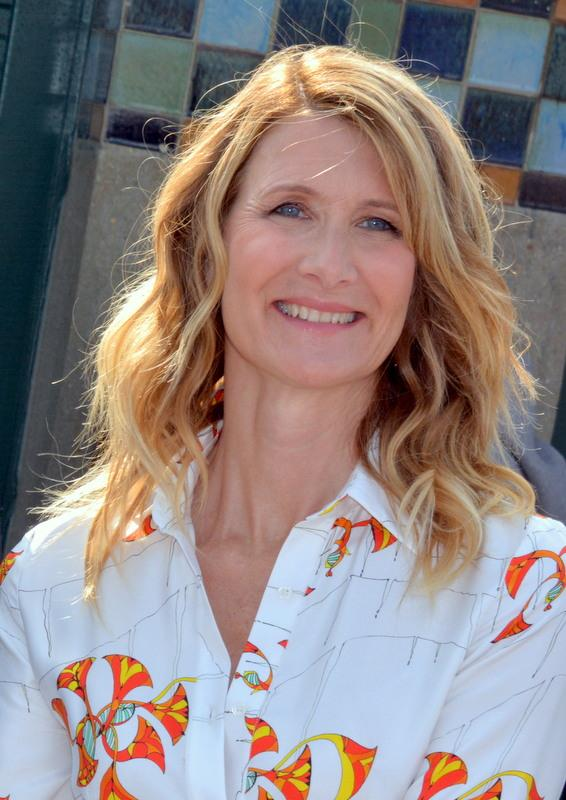
Laura Dern, Best Supporting Actress winner

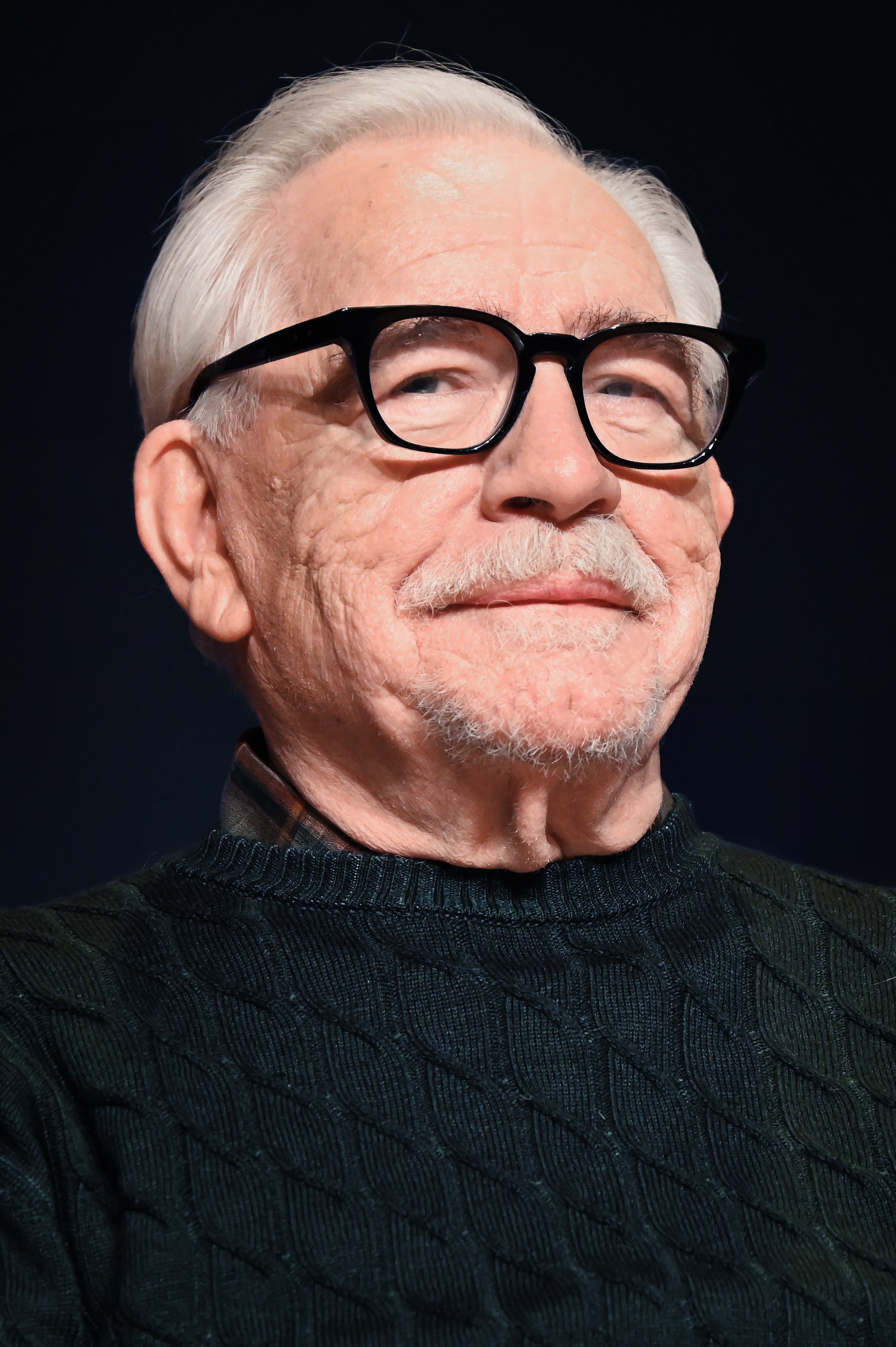
Brian Cox, Best Actor in a Television Series – Drama winner

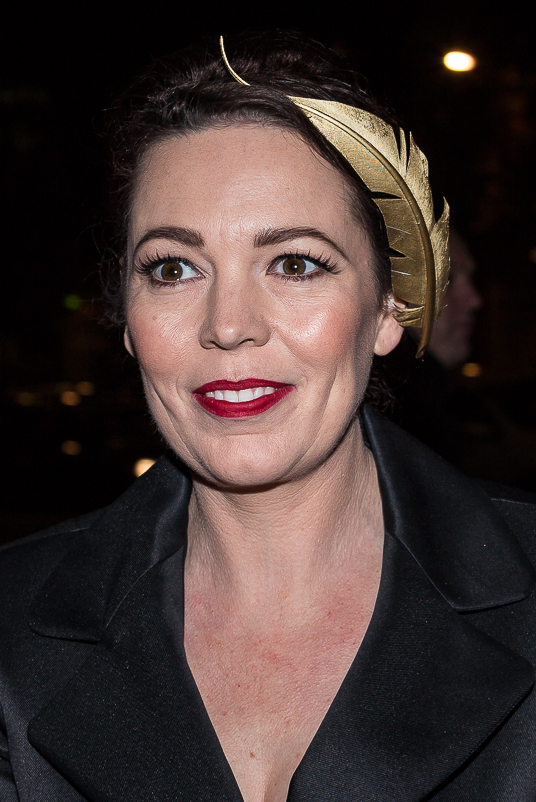
Olivia Colman, Best Actress in a Television Series – Drama winner

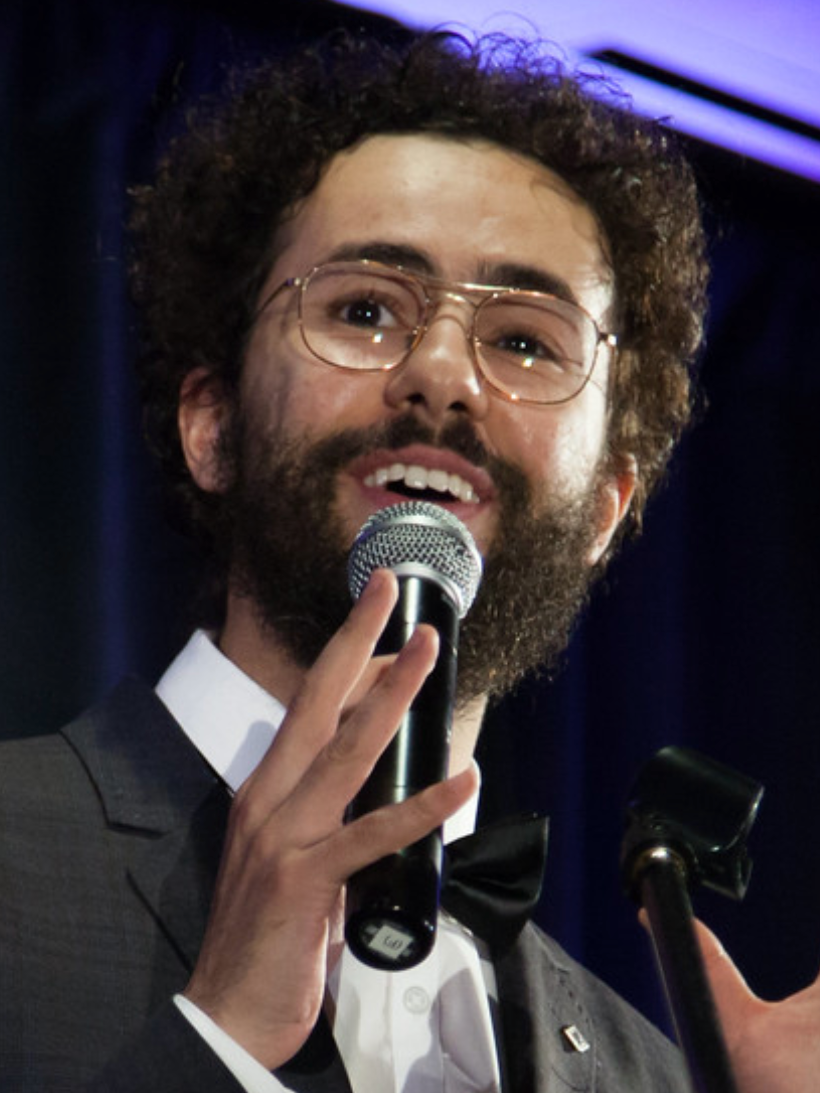
Ramy Youssef, Best Actor in a Television Series – Comedy or Musical winner

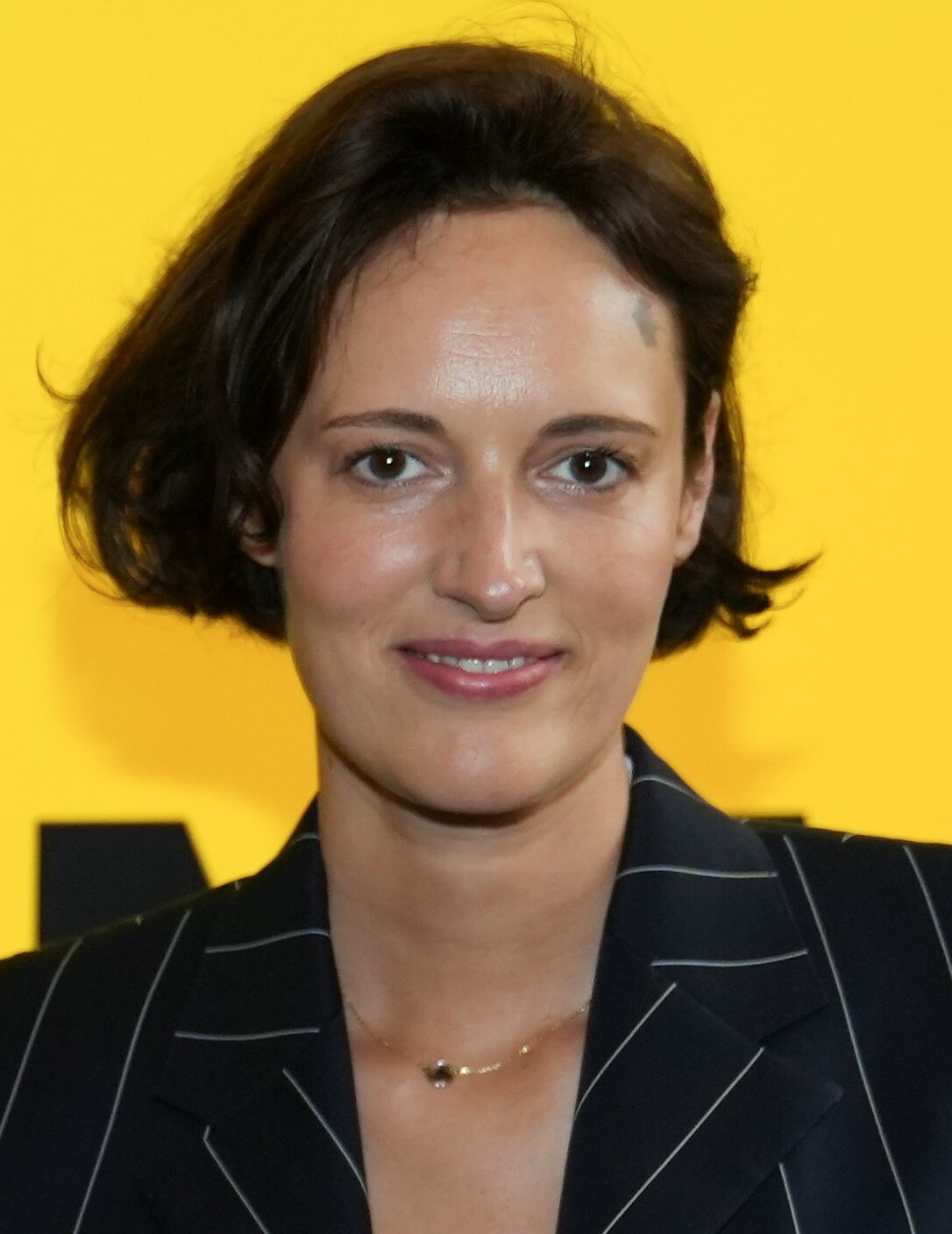
Phoebe Waller-Bridge, Best Actress in a Television Series – Comedy or Musical winner

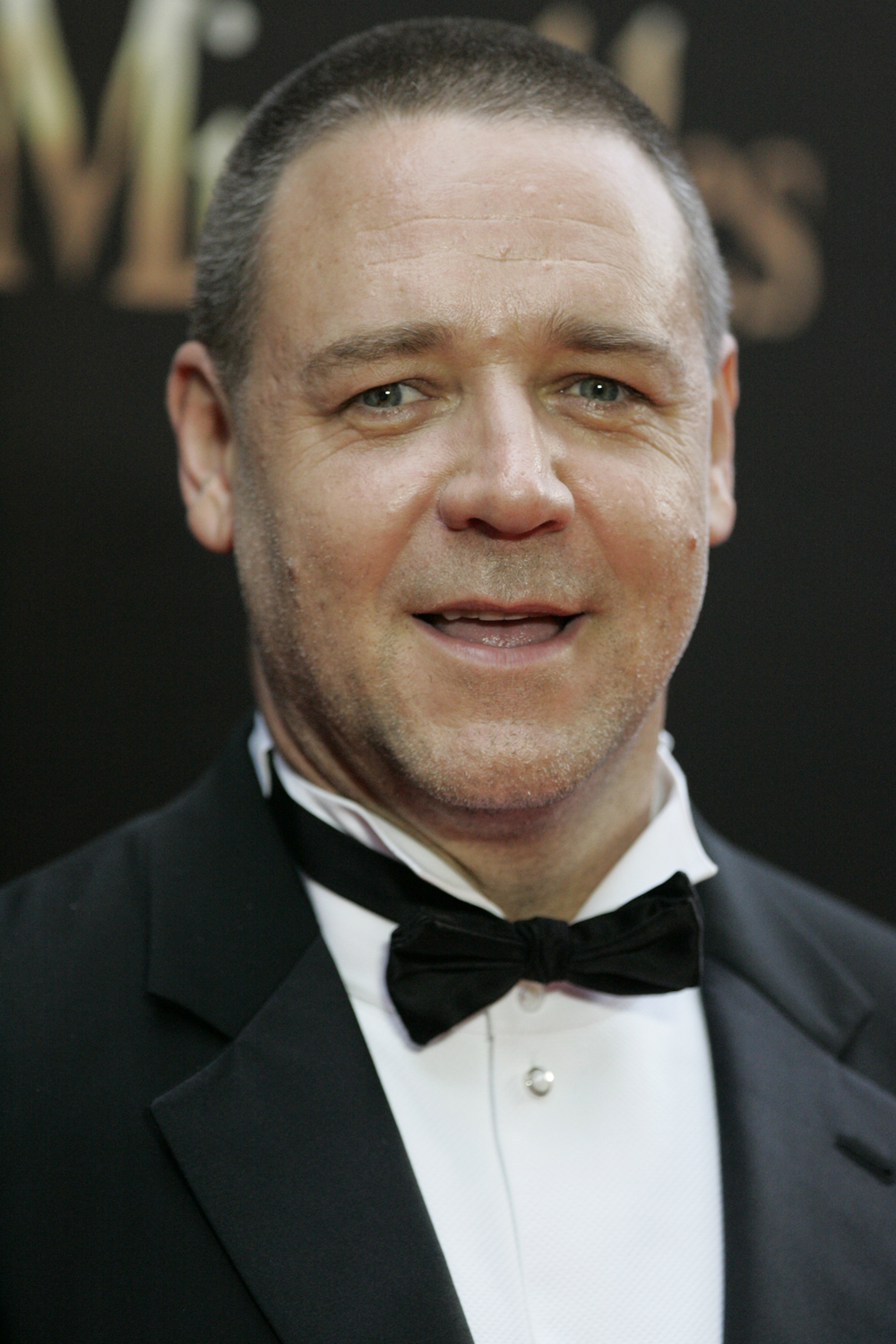
Russell Crowe, Best Actor in a Miniseries or Television Film winner

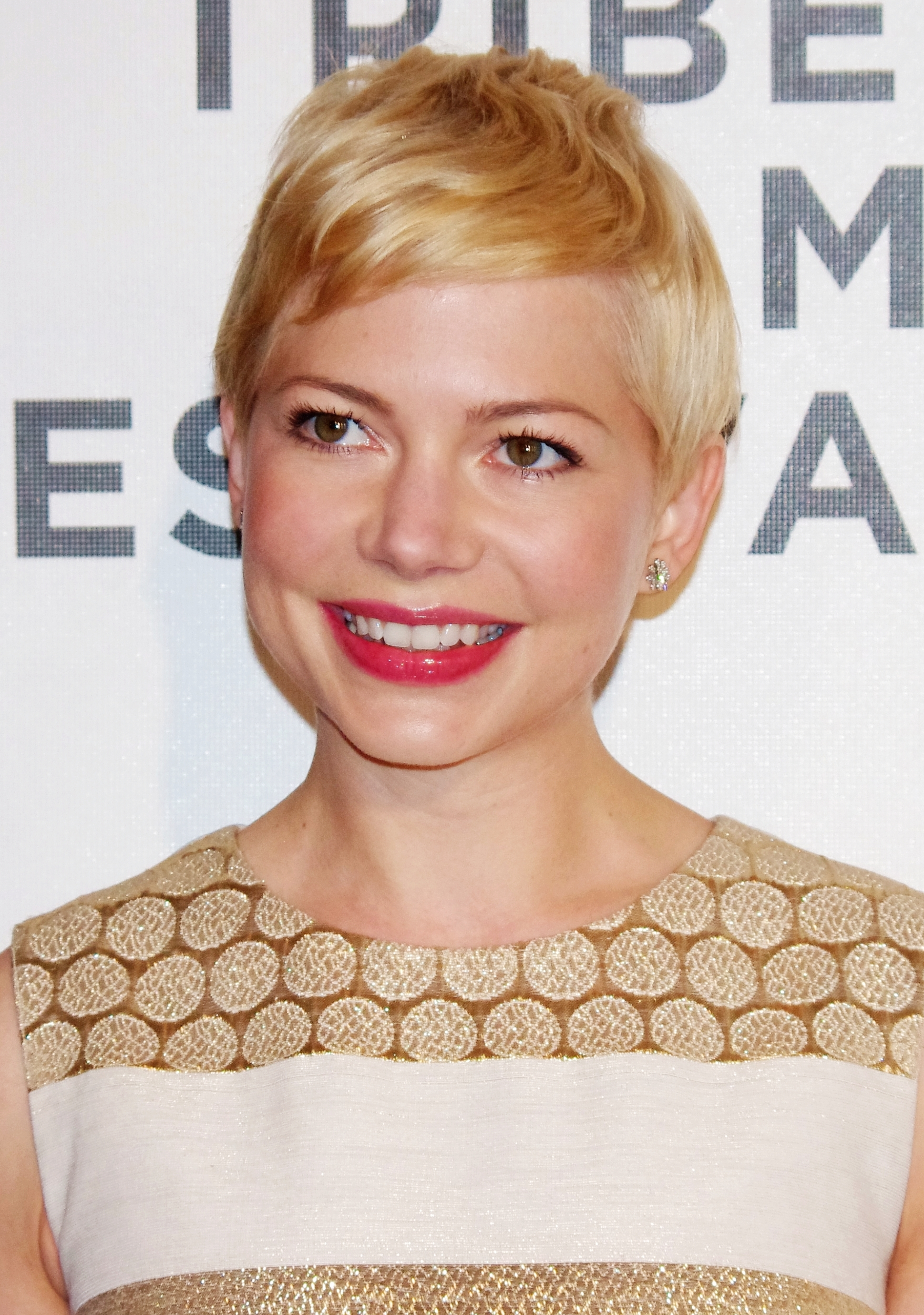
Michelle Williams, Best Actress in a Miniseries or Television Film winner

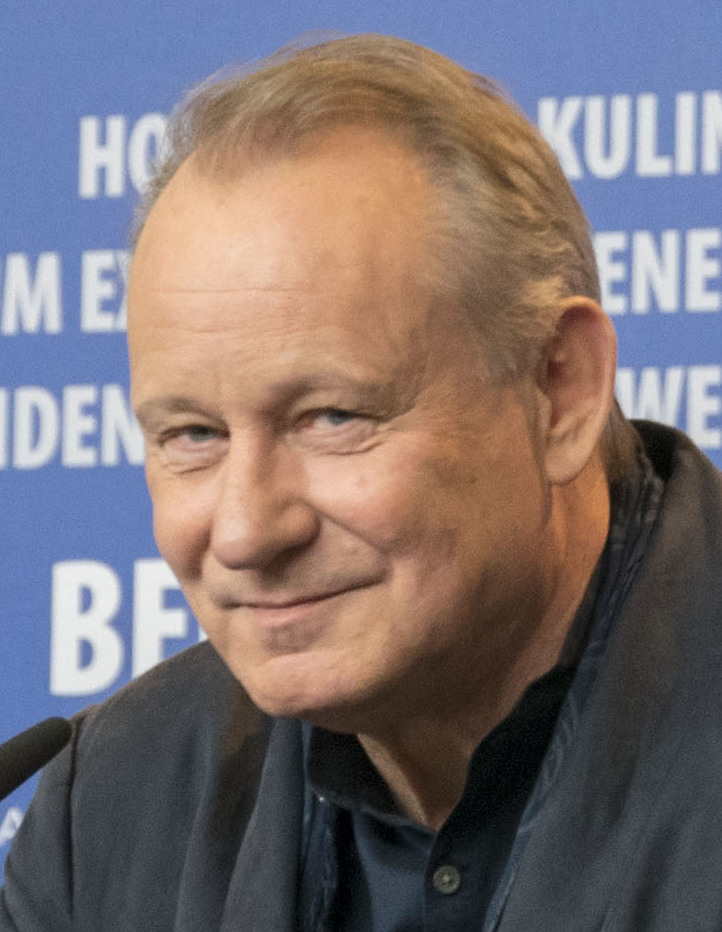
Stellan Skarsgård, Best Supporting Actor in a Series, Miniseries, or Television Film winner

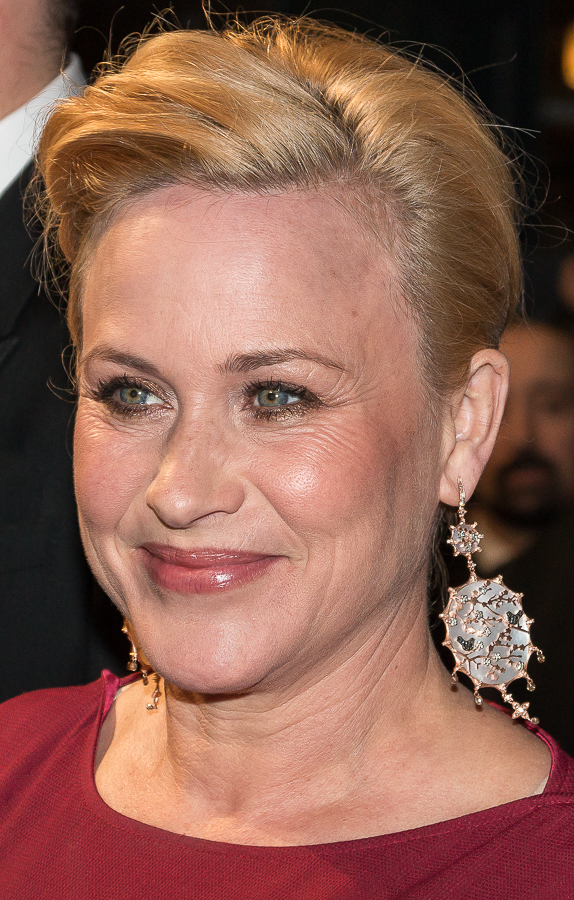
Patricia Arquette, Best Supporting Actress in a Series, Miniseries, or Television Film winner

=== Film ===
Best Motion Picture
Drama	Musical or Comedy
1917; The Irishman; Joker; Marriage Story; The Two Popes	Once Upon a Time in Hollywood; Dolemite Is My Name; Jojo Rabbit; Knives Out; Rocketman
Best Performance in a Motion Picture – Drama
Actor	Actress
Joaquin Phoenix – Joker as Arthur Fleck / Joker; Christian Bale – Ford v Ferrari as Ken Miles; Antonio Banderas – Pain and Glory as Salvador Mallo; Adam Driver – Marriage Story as Charlie Barber; Jonathan Pryce – The Two Popes as Cardinal Jorge Mario Bergoglio	Renée Zellweger – Judy as Judy Garland; Cynthia Erivo – Harriet as Harriet Tubman; Scarlett Johansson – Marriage Story as Nicole Barber; Saoirse Ronan – Little Women as Josephine "Jo" March; Charlize Theron – Bombshell as Megyn Kelly
Best Performance in a Motion Picture – Musical or Comedy
Actor	Actress
Taron Egerton – Rocketman as Elton John; Daniel Craig – Knives Out as Benoit Blanc; Roman Griffin Davis – Jojo Rabbit as Johannes "Jojo" Betzler; Leonardo DiCaprio – Once Upon a Time in Hollywood as Rick Dalton; Eddie Murphy – Dolemite Is My Name as Rudy Ray Moore	Awkwafina – The Farewell as Billi Wang; Ana de Armas – Knives Out as Marta Cabrera; Cate Blanchett – Where'd You Go, Bernadette as Bernadette Fox; Beanie Feldstein – Booksmart as Molly Davidson; Emma Thompson – Late Night as Katherine Newbury
Best Supporting Performance in a Motion Picture
Supporting Actor	Supporting Actress
Brad Pitt – Once Upon a Time in Hollywood as Cliff Booth; Tom Hanks – A Beautiful Day in the Neighborhood as Fred Rogers; Anthony Hopkins – The Two Popes as Pope Benedict XVI; Al Pacino – The Irishman as Jimmy Hoffa; Joe Pesci – The Irishman as Russell Bufalino	Laura Dern – Marriage Story as Nora Fanshaw; Kathy Bates – Richard Jewell as Barbara "Bobi" Jewell; Annette Bening – The Report as Dianne Feinstein; Jennifer Lopez – Hustlers as Ramona Vega; Margot Robbie – Bombshell as Kayla Pospisil
Other
Best Director	Best Screenplay
Sam Mendes – 1917; Bong Joon Ho – Parasite; Todd Phillips – Joker; Martin Scorsese – The Irishman; Quentin Tarantino – Once Upon a Time in Hollywood	Quentin Tarantino – Once Upon a Time in Hollywood; Noah Baumbach – Marriage Story; Bong Joon Ho and Han Jin-won – Parasite; Anthony McCarten – The Two Popes; Steven Zaillian – The Irishman
Best Original Score	Best Original Song
Hildur Guðnadóttir – Joker; Alexandre Desplat – Little Women; Randy Newman – Marriage Story; Thomas Newman – 1917; Daniel Pemberton – Motherless Brooklyn	"(I'm Gonna) Love Me Again" (Elton John and Bernie Taupin) – Rocketman; "Beautiful Ghosts" (Taylor Swift and Andrew Lloyd Webber) – Cats; "Into the Unknown" (Kristen Anderson-Lopez and Robert Lopez) – Frozen 2; "Spirit" (Beyoncé, Timothy McKenzie, and Ilya Salmanzadeh) – The Lion King; "Stand Up" (Joshuah Brian Campbell and Cynthia Erivo) – Harriet
Best Animated Feature Film	Best Foreign Language Film
Missing Link; Frozen 2; How to Train Your Dragon: The Hidden World; The Lion King; Toy Story 4	Parasite (South Korea); The Farewell (USA); Les Misérables (France); Pain and Glory (Spain); Portrait of a Lady on Fire (France)

=== Films with multiple nominations ===
The following films received multiple nominations:

Nominations	Films
6	Marriage Story
5	The Irishman
5	Once Upon a Time in Hollywood
4	Joker
4	The Two Popes
3	1917
3	Knives Out
3	Parasite
3	Rocketman
2	Bombshell
2	Dolemite Is My Name
2	The Farewell
2	Frozen 2
2	Harriet
2	Jojo Rabbit
2	The Lion King
2	Little Women
2	Pain and Glory

=== Films with multiple wins ===
The following films received multiple wins:

Wins	Films
3	Once Upon a Time in Hollywood
2	1917
2	Joker
2	Rocketman

=== Television ===
Best Television Series
Drama	Musical or Comedy
Succession (HBO); Big Little Lies (HBO); The Crown (Netflix); Killing Eve (BBC America); The Morning Show (Apple TV+)	Fleabag (Prime Video); Barry (HBO); The Kominsky Method (Netflix); The Marvelous Mrs. Maisel (Prime Video); The Politician (Netflix)
Miniseries or Television Film
Chernobyl (HBO); Catch-22 (Hulu); Fosse/Verdon (FX); The Loudest Voice (Showtime); Unbelievable (Netflix)
Best Performance in a Television Series – Drama
Actor	Actress
Brian Cox – Succession (HBO) as Logan Roy; Kit Harington – Game of Thrones (HBO) as Jon Snow; Rami Malek – Mr. Robot (USA Network) as Elliot Alderson; Tobias Menzies – The Crown (Netflix) as Prince Philip, Duke of Edinburgh; Billy Porter – Pose (FX) as Pray Tell	Olivia Colman – The Crown (Netflix) as Queen Elizabeth II; Jennifer Aniston – The Morning Show (Apple TV+) as Alex Levy; Jodie Comer – Killing Eve (BBC America) as Oksana Astankova / Villanelle; Nicole Kidman – Big Little Lies (HBO) as Celeste Wright; Reese Witherspoon – The Morning Show (Apple TV+) as Bradley Jackson
Best Performance in a Television Series – Musical or Comedy
Actor	Actress
Ramy Youssef – Ramy (Hulu) as Ramy Hassan; Michael Douglas – The Kominsky Method (Netflix) as Sandy Kominsky; Bill Hader – Barry (HBO) as Barry Berkman / Barry Block; Ben Platt – The Politician (Netflix) as Payton Hobart; Paul Rudd – Living with Yourself (Netflix) as Miles Elliot / Miles Elliot's Clone	Phoebe Waller-Bridge – Fleabag (Prime Video) as Fleabag; Christina Applegate – Dead to Me (Netflix) as Jen Harding; Rachel Brosnahan – The Marvelous Mrs. Maisel (Prime Video) as Miriam "Midge" Maisel; Kirsten Dunst – On Becoming a God in Central Florida (Showtime) as Krystal Stubbs; Natasha Lyonne – Russian Doll (Netflix) as Nadia Vulvokov
Best Performance in a Miniseries or Television Film
Actor	Actress
Russell Crowe – The Loudest Voice (Showtime) as Roger Ailes; Christopher Abbott – Catch-22 (Hulu) as Capt. John Yossarian; Sacha Baron Cohen – The Spy (Netflix) as Eli Cohen / Kamel Amin Thaabet; Jared Harris – Chernobyl (HBO) as Valery Legasov; Sam Rockwell – Fosse/Verdon (FX) as Bob Fosse	Michelle Williams – Fosse/Verdon (FX) as Gwen Verdon; Kaitlyn Dever – Unbelievable (Netflix) as Marie Adler; Joey King – The Act (Hulu) as Gypsy-Rose Blanchard; Helen Mirren – Catherine the Great (HBO) as Catherine the Great; Merritt Wever – Unbelievable (Netflix) as Det. Karen Duvall
Best Supporting Performance in a Series, Miniseries or Television Film
Supporting Actor	Supporting Actress
Stellan Skarsgård – Chernobyl (HBO) as Boris Shcherbina; Alan Arkin – The Kominsky Method (Netflix) as Norman Newlander; Kieran Culkin – Succession (HBO) as Roman Roy; Andrew Scott – Fleabag (Prime Video) as The Priest; Henry Winkler – Barry (HBO) as Gene Cousineau	Patricia Arquette – The Act (Hulu) as Dee Dee Blanchard; Helena Bonham Carter – The Crown (Netflix) as Princess Margaret; Toni Collette – Unbelievable (Netflix) as Det. Grace Rasmussen; Meryl Streep – Big Little Lies (HBO) as Mary Louise Wright; Emily Watson – Chernobyl (HBO) as Ulana Khomyuk

=== Series with multiple nominations ===
The following television series received multiple nominations:

Nominations	Series
4	Chernobyl
4	The Crown
4	Unbelievable
3	Barry
3	Big Little Lies
3	Fleabag
3	Fosse/Verdon
3	The Kominsky Method
3	The Morning Show
3	Succession
2	The Act
2	Catch-22
2	Killing Eve
2	The Loudest Voice
2	The Marvelous Mrs. Maisel
2	The Politician

=== Series with multiple wins ===
The following three series received multiple wins:

Wins	Series
2	Chernobyl
2	Fleabag
2	Succession

=== Cecil B. DeMille Award ===
The Cecil B. DeMille Award is an honorary award bestowed for outstanding contributions to the world of entertainment. It is awarded to honorees who have made a significant mark in the film industry and is named after its first recipient, director Cecil B. DeMille.

- Tom Hanks

=== Carol Burnett Award ===
The Carol Burnett Award is an honorary award given for outstanding and lasting contributions to television on or off the screen. It is named in honor of its first recipient, actress Carol Burnett.

- Ellen DeGeneres

== Ceremony ==
=== Golden Globe Ambassadors ===
The Golden Globe Ambassadors are Dylan Brosnan and Paris Brosnan, sons of Pierce Brosnan and Keely Shaye Smith.

=== Presenters ===
The following individuals presented awards at the ceremony:

- Jennifer Aniston and Reese Witherspoon with Best Actor – Television Series Musical or Comedy and Best Actor – Miniseries or Television Film
- Annette Bening introduced 1917
- Elton John and Bernie Taupin introduced Rocketman
- Matt Bomer and Sofía Vergara with Best Supporting Actor – Series, Miniseries or Television Film and Best Television Series – Drama
- Harvey Keitel introduced The Irishman
- Ted Danson and Kerry Washington with Best Actress – Television Series Musical or Comedy
- Kit Harington and Sienna Miller with Best Foreign Language Film
- Kate McKinnon with the Carol Burnett Award
- Daniel Craig and Ana de Armas introduced Knives Out
- Tim Allen and Lauren Graham with Best Actor – Television Series Drama
- Ewan McGregor and Margot Robbie with Best Screenplay
- Amy Poehler and Taylor Swift with Best Animated Feature Film
- Leonardo DiCaprio and Brad Pitt introduced Once Upon a Time in Hollywood
- Gwyneth Paltrow with Best Supporting Actress – Motion Picture
- Priyanka Chopra and Nick Jonas with Best Television Series – Musical or Comedy
- Ansel Elgort and Dakota Fanning with Best Original Song
- Sacha Baron Cohen introduced Jojo Rabbit
- Zoë Kravitz and Jason Momoa with Best Supporting Actress – Series, Miniseries or Television Film and Best Actress – Television Series Drama
- Charlize Theron with the Cecil B. DeMille Award
- Antonio Banderas and Helen Mirren with Best Director
- Cate Blanchett introduced Joker
- Tiffany Haddish and Salma Hayek with Best Actress – Miniseries or Television Film and Best Miniseries or Television Film
- Da'Vine Joy Randolph and Wesley Snipes introduced Dolemite Is My Name
- Jennifer Lopez and Paul Rudd with Best Original Score and Best Supporting Actor – Motion Picture
- Chris Evans and Scarlett Johansson with Best Actor – Motion Picture Musical or Comedy and Best Actress – Motion Picture Musical or Comedy
- Jason Bateman and Naomi Watts introduced Marriage Story
- Rachel Weisz introduced The Two Popes
- Pierce Brosnan and Will Ferrell with Best Motion Picture – Musical or Comedy
- Glenn Close with Best Actor – Motion Picture Drama
- Rami Malek with Best Actress – Motion Picture Drama
- Sandra Bullock with Best Motion Picture – Drama

== Reception to Ricky Gervais' opening monologue ==
Ricky Gervais
(@rickygervais)
tweeted:

1. Simply pointing out whether someone is left or right wing isn't winning the argument.
2. If a joke is good enough, it can be enjoyed by anyone.
3. It's not all about you.
4. Just because you're offended, doesn't mean you're right.

January 8, 2020

Criticism arose following Ricky Gervais' opening monologue, which was seen as an attack on the perceived hypocrisy of Hollywood. He joked about several controversial topics, such as the death of Jeffrey Epstein, the college admissions scandal and the middle-aged Leonardo DiCaprio's dating history with younger women. Gervais also jokingly accused the Hollywood Foreign Press of racism for its lack of diversity and an "In Memoriam" section, mocked Amazon, Apple and Disney for their unfair labor practices, and chastised awardees who talk about their political views in acceptance speeches.

Gervais' comments attained mixed reactions across the political spectrum. While conservatives highly praised Gervais, journalists from liberal outlets were more critical, with Rolling Stone's Rob Sheffield calling his monologue "incredibly stale". Of the criticism, Gervais said it was the "best ever" and later defended his jokes via tweet.

== See also ==
- 92nd Academy Awards
- 47th Annie Awards
- 25th Critics' Choice Awards
- 73rd British Academy Film Awards
- 40th Golden Raspberry Awards
- 23rd Hollywood Film Awards
- 35th Independent Spirit Awards
- 24th Satellite Awards
- 26th Screen Actors Guild Awards
