= Gypsy-Rose Blanchard =

American convicted murderer (born 1991)

- Born: July 27, 1991 (age 35); Raceland, Louisiana, U.S.
- Known for: Murder of Dee Dee Blanchard
- Spouse: Ryan Anderson (m. 2022; div. 2024)
- Partner: Ken Urker (2017-2019; 2024–2026)
- Children: 1
- Parent: Clauddine Blanchard (mother)
- Status: Released on parole December 28, 2023; sentence since completed
- Conviction: Second-degree murder
- Penalty: 10 years imprisonment

Details
- Date: June 10, 2015
- Target: Dee Dee Blanchard
- Killed: 1 (by proxy)
- Date apprehended: June 15, 2015

Gypsy-Rose Blanchard (born July 27, 1991) is an American woman who was convicted of the murder of her mother, Clauddine "Dee Dee" Blanchard. She had conspired with her boyfriend Nicholas Godejohn to have him stab her mother, which occurred in June 2015 at the house where she lived with her mother in Springfield, Missouri. She was initially charged with first-degree murder, but she later pleaded guilty to second-degree murder and was sentenced to ten years in prison. After Dee Dee's death, allegations surfaced that Dee Dee abused Gypsy-Rose and misrepresented Gypsy-Rose's health, which drew national attention to the case.

She was released on parole on December 28, 2023, after serving about eight and a half years of her ten-year sentence. Given the sensational aspects of Blanchard's childhood, including allegations that her mother forced her to pretend to be disabled and terminally ill, she gained widespread media attention. Hulu produced a limited series, The Act (2019), released while she was still in prison, and she has been featured in interviews on a variety of TV shows, such as Dr. Phil; other programs have been based on her story. In 2024, her own reality show, Gypsy Rose: Life After Lock Up, premiered on Lifetime.

== Early life ==
Gypsy-Rose Blanchard was born on July 27, 1991, in Raceland, Louisiana, U.S., to Clauddine "Dee Dee" Blanchard (née Pitre) and Rod Blanchard. They met when he was in high school; she was 24 and he was 17. They dated for a few months, and when Dee Dee learned she was pregnant, they married. Rod later said that on his 18th birthday he realized he had "married for the wrong reasons" and "wasn't in love with her." They separated soon afterward, before Blanchard's birth, and later divorced, and Dee Dee was given custody of Blanchard. Rod remarried and had two more children. When Blanchard was three months old, Dee Dee thought her daughter had sleep apnea. By the time Blanchard was eight, Dee Dee told Rod that Blanchard had leukemia, muscular dystrophy, and was paralyzed, though none of these conditions were true. She was also using a wheelchair and had a feeding tube. When Blanchard was 10, she and Dee Dee moved.

== Move to Missouri ==
After Hurricane Katrina destroyed their Louisiana home, Dee Dee and Blanchard lived in a rented home in Aurora in southwestern Missouri. During their time there, Blanchard was honored by the Oley Foundation, which advocates for the rights of feeding-tube recipients, as its 2007 Child of the Year. In 2008, Habitat for Humanity built them a small home with a wheelchair ramp and hot tub as part of a larger project on the north side of Springfield, to the east, and the two moved there. The story of a single mother with a severely disabled daughter forced to flee Katrina's devastation received considerable local media attention, and the community often pitched in to help Dee Dee (who was now going by Clauddinnea Blancharde).

Dee Dee regularly shaved Blanchard's head, allegedly telling her that since her medication would eventually cause her hair to fall out, it was best to shave it in advance; Blanchard often wore wigs or hats to cover her baldness. When they left the house, Dee Dee often took an oxygen tank and feeding tube with them; Blanchard was fed the children's liquid nutrition supplement PediaSure well into her 20s.

Blanchard's father, Rod, recalled that Dee Dee told him their daughter had a "chromosomal defect" that explained many of her health issues. In 2011, Blanchard was diagnosed with 1q21.1 deletion syndrome, which can increase the risk of delayed development, intellectual disability, physical abnormalities, and neurological and psychiatric problems. Her former pediatrician, Dr. Rob Steel, confirmed in an interview that she had strabismus as an infant, which required surgery to correct and prevent blindness.

In 2024, April "Fancy" Macelli, a former associate of the Blanchard family who had been given access to Blanchard's private medical records and other case material, publicly expressed doubts that Dee Dee had Munchausen syndrome by proxy. Macelli claimed that the diagnosis had been promoted by Blanchard's stepmother, Kristy.

== Growing independence ==
Dee Dee likely, at least once, forged a copy of Blanchard's birth certificate, changing her birthdate to 1995 to bolster claims that she was still a teenager. Blanchard said in a later interview that for 14 years she was unsure of her real age.

Blanchard had attended science fiction and fantasy conventions since 2001, sometimes in costume, since she could blend into their diverse and inclusive communities in her wheelchair. At a 2011 event, she made what may have been an escape attempt that ended when her mother found her in a hotel room with a man named Dan that she had met online. Again, Dee Dee showed the paperwork giving Blanchard's false, younger birthdate and threatened to inform the police.

During court testimony, Dan stated he kept in contact with Blanchard via video chat and they would send explicit videos to each other. He claims they role-played occasionally and that he developed a taste for power exchange role-playing from Blanchard. He also stated Blanchard would send nude photos, dress up in costumes, and use various fictitious names.

In June 2011, Blanchard attempted another escape by shooting her mother ten times with a BB gun, which she initially believed was a real firearm. Dee Dee told others that the injuries resulted from a robbery attempt at a nearby Walmart.

Sometime around 2012, Blanchard, who continued to use the Internet and phone freely, made contact online with Nicholas Godejohn, a man around her age from Big Bend, Wisconsin, whom she said she had met on a Christian singles website. Blanchard and Godejohn exchanged over 100 videos during their online relationship. In one video, in which Blanchard is using one of her multiple personas, she says the following about the children they may have together:

"The plan for if we have a boy first, we're going to protect him and our children from the outside world, because they can't know about you being a vampire",

"If we have a girl, the way it has to be, she has to lose her virginity to you because you are the master of the household".

"I will have to explain that to her when she's of an age where it's time to explain it, like not when she's 7, more like around 13".

In 2014, Blanchard confided to 23-year-old neighbor Aleah Woodmansee (who, unaware that Blanchard was closer to her own age, considered herself a "big sister"), that she and Godejohn had discussed eloping and had even chosen names for potential children. According to law-enforcement reports and media coverage, Blanchard maintained multiple Facebook accounts under different names. Despite Blanchard alleging Dee Dee would not allow her internet access, which went as far as allegedly destroying her daughter's phone and laptop, she maintained online contact with Woodmansee, who saved printouts of her posts, until 2014.

Blanchard and Godejohn communicated online for years, which Blanchard kept a secret because Dee Dee would not have allowed it. In 2015, Blanchard arranged and paid for Godejohn to travel to Springfield with money stolen from her mother. She planned to pretend to meet him for the first time at a movie theater with her mother, then appear to strike up a relationship based on the supposed chance encounter. At trial, Blanchard testified that this meeting was one of three plans she had made to be with Godejohn. She had "plans A, B, and C" to be with him. She also testified they had been discussing killing Dee Dee for about a year and that she had considered other methods earlier.

Godejohn claims that Blanchard made it clear to him that as long as Dee Dee was alive, they couldn't be together and told him that getting rid of her was the only option. Blanchard admitted she "talked [Godejohn] into [the murder plot]", at one point allegedly texting him, "For motivation sake bring your A game hun. This is life with me on the line,".

Less than a month before the murder, Blanchard sent Godejohn a video of her walking into her mother's room, pointing at Dee Dee's pillow and making a stabbing motion.

== Murder of Dee Dee Blanchard ==
On the day of the murder, Blanchard texted Godejohn, "The ***** gonna go down tonight…just the gloves and knife?'" Godejohn responded, "…duct tape too…to muffle her." Blanchard said she would "precut" the tape.

Godejohn returned to Springfield on June 10, 2015, arriving while Blanchard and Dee Dee were away at a doctor's appointment. That same day, after the two returned home from a Dollar General, they had an argument, reconciled, and spent the evening painting each other's nails. Blanchard stated that the last words her mother said to her were "I'm starting to feel more relaxed. Don't hurt me".

After Dee Dee had gone to sleep, Godejohn went to the Blanchard house. Blanchard let him in and gave him duct tape, gloves, and a knife with the understanding that he would use it to murder Dee Dee.

Blanchard alleges that she hid in the bathroom and covered her ears so that she would not have to hear her mother scream. Godejohn then entered Dee Dee's bedroom and stabbed Dee Dee 17 times in the back while she was asleep. Afterward, the two had sex in Blanchard's room, and stole more than $4,400 in cash that Dee Dee had been keeping in the house. They called a taxi cab and fled to a motel outside Springfield, Missouri, where they stayed a few days while planning their next move. During their time at the motel, they were seen on security cameras at several stores. Blanchard said at that point she believed the two had gotten away with their crime.

In a video recorded by Blanchard of the pair in a hotel room the day after the murder, she can be heard laughing and says about Godejohn, "He's eating a brownie, but later he will be eating me."

They mailed the murder weapon back to Godejohn's home in Wisconsin to avoid being caught with it, then took a bus there. Several witnesses who saw the pair on their way to the Greyhound station noted that Blanchard wore a blonde wig and walked unassisted.

=== Investigation and arrests ===
After seeing concerning Facebook statuses posted from Dee Dee's account, the Blanchards' friends suspected something was amiss. When phone calls went unanswered, several friends and neighbors went to the house. While the friends and neighbors knew that the two often left on medical trips unannounced, they saw Dee Dee's modified car still in the driveway, making an unannounced trip unlikely. Protective film on the windows made it hard to see inside in the low light. No one answered the door, so the gathered friends called 9-1-1. When the police arrived, they had to wait for a search warrant to be issued before they could enter, but they allowed one of the neighbors to climb through a window. He reported that the inside of the house was largely undisturbed and that Blanchard's wheelchairs were present.

When the warrant was issued, police entered the house and found Dee Dee's body. Neighbors were concerned about how Blanchard would do without her wheelchair, medications, and support equipment, such as the oxygen tanks and feeding tube. Friends set up a GoFundMe account to pay for Dee Dee's funeral expenses and possibly Blanchard's.

Woodmansee, who was among those gathered on the Blanchards' lawn, told police what she knew about Blanchard and her secret boyfriend. She showed them the printouts she had saved, which included his name. Based on that information, police asked Facebook to trace the IP address from which the posts to Dee Dee's Facebook account had been made. The IP was traced back to Wisconsin, and the next day police agencies in Waukesha County raided the Godejohns' Big Bend home. Godejohn and Blanchard surrendered and were taken into custody on charges of murder and felony armed criminal action.

The news that Blanchard was safe was greeted with relief in Springfield, where she and Godejohn were soon extradited to and held on $1 million bond. But, in announcing the news, Greene County Sheriff Jim Arnott warned, "things are not always what they appear". The media in Springfield soon reported the truth of the Blanchards' lives: that Blanchard had never been sick and had always been able to walk, but her mother had made her pretend otherwise, allegedly using physical abuse to control her. Arnott urged people not to donate money to the family until investigators learned the extent of the fraud.

As shown in the documentary Mommy Dead and Dearest, Blanchard made several statements later shown to be untrue. In post-arrest interrogation footage, she denied any involvement in her mother's killing, repeatedly responding "No, sir" when asked if she had committed or assisted in the murder of Dee Dee. She also stated, "I'm innocent. What they say on the news is not true."

Blanchard pleaded guilty to second-degree murder, and was sentenced to ten years in prison. Godejohn was found guilty of first-degree murder and sentenced to life in prison without parole and an additional 25 years for armed criminal action.

== Personal life ==
Blanchard was released on parole on December 28, 2023, after serving eight years of her ten-year sentence. Following her release, she gave several television interviews, including appearances on Good Morning America, CNN, and The View. She has also been featured in documentaries and published a memoir. Her public profile has led to controversy, including accusations that she has profited from her crime. In March 2024, she faced criticism for saying she did not "identify as a murderer," during an interview on the Viall Files podcast.

In 2024, Blanchard and her then-husband Ryan Anderson were featured in the Lifetime docuseries Gypsy Rose: Life After Lock Up. The couple separated and later divorced.

Since 2024, Blanchard was in a relationship with Ken Urker. Their daughter was born in December 2024. In September 2025, Blanchard told imprisoned friend Amelia Bird in a recorded phone call that she had stabbed the headboard of her and Urker's bed with a knife after discovering a card Urker had allegedly written to a former girlfriend. Blanchard recounted to Bird:

"I go to that headboard and I stab that motherfucking headboard, and I carved 'whore' in the headboard."

"And I put a note that said 'Sleep with your one and only. -G'"

According to Blanchard, Urker subsequently threatened to seek sole custody of their daughter, reportedly texting her "You are a danger to yourself and others around you.". In May 2026, a recording made by Blanchard was shared online showing her cutting up a blanket belonging to Urker while screaming and accusing him of lying and manipulation. The pair had ended their relationship before Urker died on October 1, 2026, his 34th birthday. After his death, Urker's sister Autumn disputed Blanchard's account of the relationship, saying that the couple had separated as Urker had been unhappy with Blanchard. Prison phone calls from December 2020 and March 2021 revealed that Blanchard had told Urker that she "hopes he overdose[s]" and said to Anderson about Urker, "No, even after I told him he could overdose and all that, like, he still kept himself on my email, like, he never took himself off no matter how bad we got into it or how bad it seemed like we were at odds,". Blanchard also described how she would refuse to let another romantic interest ignore her, saying she would show up at his door and throw cans at his car.

In March 2026, Blanchard sparked outrage when she created a TikTok video with influencer Natalie Reynolds that showed her making a joke about her involvement in her mother's murder. In August, recordings of prison phone calls between Blanchard and Anderson were shared online. In the calls, Blanchard used racial slurs and made other racist comments, including derogatory remarks about her sister's interracial relationship. Another recording shared online contained Blanchard and Anderson talking about sexual activity while Anderson was at the school where he worked.

== Fictionalizations in popular culture ==
- In 2019, Hulu released an eight part mini-series, The Act. Joey King portrayed Gypsy-Rose and Patricia Arquette portrayed Dee Dee.
- In 2019, a crime drama film inspired by Gypsy-Rose's case, Love You to Death, aired on Lifetime, starring Marcia Gay Harden and Emily Skeggs with the characters' names changed.

== Documentaries and interviews ==
As herself
Year	Title	Role	Ref.
2017	Mommy Dead and Dearest	Documentary; appears in both a prison interview and archive footage.	
2017	Dr. Phil	Guest; prison interview; 2 episodes	
2018	ABC News Nightline	Guest; prison interview	
2018	Gypsy's Revenge	Prison interview; Cameo footage	
2024	Good Morning America	Guest; 2 episodes	
2024	The View	Guest; 1 episode	
2024	The Prison Confessions of Gypsy Rose Blanchard	Documentary series	
2024	Gypsy Rose: Life After Lock Up	Reality television series	
2024	The Kardashians	Guest; 1 episode	
2024	This Morning	Guest; 1 episode	
