= Murder of Dee Dee Blanchard =

2015 matricide in Missouri, U.S.

- Dee Dee Blanchard, c. 2014
- Date: June 10, 2015; 11 years ago (murder); June 14, 2015; 11 years ago (body discovered)
- Location: Springfield, Missouri, U.S.; 37.2668°N 93.3182°W
- Type: Murder by stabbing, matricide
- Motive: For Gypsy-Rose to escape abuse inflicted by Dee Dee
- Perpetrators: Nicholas Godejohn and Gypsy-Rose Blanchard
- Deaths: 1
- Injuries: 1 (alleged) (Note: Gypsy-Rose alleged that Godejohn raped her following the attack.)
- Verdict: Gypsy-Rose Blanchard: Pleaded guilty Nicholas Godejohn: Guilty on both counts
- Convictions: Gypsy-Rose Blanchard: Second-degree murder Nicholas Godejohn: First-degree murder, armed criminal action
- Sentence: Gypsy-Rose Blanchard: Ten years in prison; paroled after eight-and-a-half years Nicholas Godejohn: Life imprisonment without possibility of parole plus 25 years

During the early morning hours of June 10, 2015, Clauddine "Dee Dee" Blanchard (née Pitre; born May 3, 1967, in Chackbay, Louisiana, United States) was stabbed to death in her Springfield, Missouri, home. She was murdered by Nicholas Godejohn. The murder was planned by Godejohn and Dee Dee’s daughter, Gypsy-Rose Blanchard.

The murder went undiscovered for four days; neighbors called police after seeing alarming Facebook posts written by Gypsy-Rose the day before. Hours later, both Gypsy-Rose and Godejohn were arrested in his native Big Bend, Wisconsin, and confessed to the murder. The media revealed that Dee Dee had forced Gypsy-Rose to pretend to have severe physical and mental disabilities for financial and social advantage, a condition known as factitious disorder imposed on another (FDIA).

In 2016, Gypsy Rose Blanchard accepted a plea agreement, pleading guilty to second-degree murder and receiving a ten-year prison sentence. Court records established that she had planned the killing with her online boyfriend, Nicholas Godejohn, whom she had met on a Christian dating website. In June 2015, Godejohn traveled to Springfield, Missouri, where he fatally stabbed Clauddine "Dee Dee" Blanchard while Gypsy Rose was present in the home. After the murder, the pair fled to Wisconsin, where they were later arrested after posting messages on social media that drew attention to the crime.

During Godejohn's trial in November 2018, prosecutors presented evidence of premeditation, including online messages between the two discussing plans for the killing. The defense argued that Godejohn had diminished capacity due to autism spectrum disorder, but the jury found him guilty of first-degree murder, and he was sentenced to life in prison without the possibility of parole. Blanchard, who had cooperated with investigators, was granted parole and released in late 2023 after serving more than eight years. The case drew widespread attention after investigators uncovered evidence that Dee Dee had subjected her daughter to years of medical abuse, including falsifying illnesses and unnecessary treatments, which became a significant factor in public discussion. Blanchard was paroled at the end of 2023.

== Dee Dee Blanchard ==
=== Early life and family ===
Dee Dee Blanchard (born Clauddine Pitre on May 3, 1967) was born in Chackbay, Louisiana, United States, and raised in nearby Golden Meadow, Louisiana. She was one of several children born to Claude Anthony Pitre Sr. and Emma Lois Gisclair Pitre.

Her mother died in 1997.

=== Education and early adulthood ===
Public documentation regarding Blanchard's formal education is limited. She is reported to have attended local schools in Louisiana but did not pursue higher education.

During this period, Blanchard reportedly experienced instability in personal relationships and living arrangements, though detailed records are limited.

=== Relationship, marriage, and early family life ===
At age 23, Dee Dee Pitre met Rod Blanchard, then 17, at a bowling alley bar in Louisiana. The two began a relationship that progressed quickly, and Blanchard became pregnant soon afterward.

The couple married on December 27, 1990. Their daughter, Gypsy-Rose Blanchard, was born on July 27, 1991, in Louisiana. Following the birth of their daughter, the marriage quickly deteriorated. Rod Blanchard later stated in interviews that he felt he had married "for the wrong reasons" and was not prepared for family life at the time. He and Dee Dee Blanchard separated prior to or shortly after Gypsy-Rose's birth, and the couple later divorced.

=== Transition into later life patterns ===
Following the birth of her daughter, Dee Dee Blanchard told family members that Gypsy-Rose had a number of serious health conditions, including reported leukemia, muscular dystrophy, epilepsy, and developmental disabilities.

Blanchard sought medical treatment for her daughter from numerous healthcare providers across several states and frequently relocated which contributed to fragmented medical records and repeated diagnostic evaluations. According to law enforcement records and reporting based on court proceedings, some of the conditions described were not supported by medical findings and were determined by authorities as having been misrepresented.

Evidence presented in court proceedings and media reports indicated that Gypsy became aware over time that her health was not exactly as it had been portrayed. During later testimony, she stated that she sought to escape her mother's control and ultimately conspired with her boyfriend, Nicholas Godejohn, in the murder.

According to the probable cause statement and court findings, Gypsy participated in the planning of the killing, including communicating with Godejohn in advance and facilitating the murder. Reports based on the affidavit state that she provided the weapon and hid in another room while the attack was carried out. In sworn testimony during Godejohn's trial, Gypsy stated that she had persuaded him to commit the murder, stating that she "talked him into it".

== Gypsy-Rose Blanchard ==
According to Rod Blanchard, when Gypsy was three months old, Dee Dee became convinced that the infant had sleep apnea and began taking her to receive medical care. Repeated overnight stays with a sleep monitor and other tests found no evidence of the condition. Over time, Dee Dee asserted that Gypsy had a wide range of medical issues, which she attributed to an unspecified chromosomal disorder. In 2012, Gypsy was diagnosed with 1q21.1 deletion syndrome which can increase the risk of delayed development, intellectual disability, physical abnormalities, and neurological and psychiatric problems. Additionally, Gypsy's former pediatrician, Dr. Rob Steel, confirmed in an interview that Gypsy had strabismus as an infant, which required surgery to correct and prevent blindness.

In later accounts of her life, including interviews and her memoir, Gypsy-Rose Blanchard described aspects of her early childhood and family environment. She alleged that when she was about five years old, her maternal grandfather behaved inappropriately toward her and her mother during bathing. She also recalled that at around seven or eight years old, she was involved in a minor motorcycle accident with him, resulting in a knee abrasion. These claims form part of her personal narrative and have not been independently substantiated in court findings.

Blanchard has also described a childhood marked by instability following her parents' separation. She reported that she and her mother, Dee Dee Blanchard, frequently moved residences and relied on assistance from charities. After Hurricane Katrina, they relocated to Missouri, where Dee Dee presented Gypsy as suffering from multiple severe illnesses, while Gypsy herself later stated that she was also involved in helping maintain or reinforce some of those false claims about her medical condition. Medical records and subsequent investigations indicated a pattern in which Dee Dee misrepresented her daughter's health, leading to unnecessary treatments and interventions. These circumstances have been widely discussed in connection with factitious disorder imposed on another (formerly called Munchausen syndrome by proxy) and were a significant element in understanding the background of the case.

Gypsy frequently attended Special Olympics events with her parents. She was named the honorary queen of the Krewe of Mid-City, a child-focused Mardi Gras parade in New Orleans. At the event, she described herself as an animal lover with four cats and her grandfather as her "best friend".

Dee Dee sustained a leg injury that Gypsy later recalled resulted from a car accident, requiring a two‑month hospital stay. During this period, Dee Dee and Gypsy lived with Gypsy's maternal grandfather, Claude, for about ten months. In her 2024 book, Gypsy accused Claude of abusing both her and her mother during this time.

Around this period, Dee Dee began taking Gypsy to science fiction and fantasy conventions. They sometimes attended in costume, which allowed Gypsy to blend in.

Gypsy appears to have stopped attending school after second grade, possibly even earlier. Dee Dee homeschooled her thereafter, citing Gypsy's alleged illnesses. Gypsy has said she learned to read independently by reading the Harry Potter books.

After Claude remarried, Dee Dee and Gypsy moved in with him and his new wife, Laura. Family members later alleged that Dee Dee poisoned Laura's food with Roundup weed killer, contributing to Laura's chronic illness during this period.

According to relatives, when they confronted her about her treatment of Gypsy and raised concerns about Laura's health, Dee Dee left the household with Gypsy. The family said that Laura's condition improved afterward.

== Move to New Orleans ==
Dee Dee and Gypsy settled in the New Orleans suburb of Slidell, where they lived in public housing. Dee Dee supported herself through child‑support payments from her ex‑husband, Rod, and through public assistance tied to Gypsy's purported medical conditions. She continued taking Gypsy to numerous specialists, primarily at Tulane Medical Center and the Children's Hospital of New Orleans. Some physicians provided treatment based on the conditions Dee Dee reported. After she told doctors that Gypsy experienced seizures every few months, they prescribed anti-seizure medication. During this period, Gypsy underwent surgery, and Dee Dee frequently took her to the emergency room for minor ailments.

According to the Springfield News‑Leader, Dee Dee regularly consulted with Dr. Robert Beckerman, who was said to have treated Gypsy for ten years.

After Hurricane Katrina devastated the region in August 2005, Dee Dee and Gypsy left their damaged apartment and relocated to a special‑needs shelter in Covington, where they stayed for three months. Dee Dee told officials that Gypsy's medical records and birth certificate had been lost in the flood. A doctor at the shelter, who was originally from the Ozarks, suggested that they relocate to Missouri. The following month, they were airlifted there as part of the resettlement program for people displaced by the hurricane.

=== Move to Missouri (2005) ===
Dee Dee and Gypsy initially lived in a rented home in Aurora, in southwestern Missouri. During this period, Gypsy was honored by the Oley Foundation, an organization that advocates for the rights of feeding‑tube recipients, as its 2007 Child of the Year.

== Move to Springfield ==
In 2008, Dee Dee and Gypsy moved east to Springfield. Habitat for Humanity built a small house for them on the city's north side, equipped with a wheelchair ramp and hot tub as part of a larger development project. The story of a single mother caring for a severely disabled daughter who had fled Hurricane Katrina drew considerable local media attention. The community frequently offered assistance to the family, and Dee Dee—now identifying as Clauddinnea Blanchard—continued to go by her longtime nickname. She also set up an outdoor movie screen at their home and charged neighbors $1 or $5 to watch films. Neighbors described Dee Dee as a friendly and caring woman.

In the summer of 2009, Children's Mercy Hospitals and Clinics published a story highlighting a reunion between Dee Dee, Gypsy, and Dr. Robert Beckerman following an appointment at the Comprehensive Sleep Disorders Center.

The outpouring of support in Missouri included numerous charitable contributions. While living in Louisiana, the pair had primarily relied on occasional stays at Ronald McDonald Houses during medical appointments; in Missouri, they received free flights to Children's Mercy Hospital in Kansas City, trips to Walt Disney World, and backstage passes to Miranda Lambert concerts through the Make-A-Wish Foundation. Rod Blanchard continued to make monthly child‑support payments of $1,200, sent gifts to Gypsy, and occasionally spoke with her by phone. He later recalled that during one call on Gypsy's eighteenth birthday, Dee Dee told him not to mention her daughter's real age because "she thinks she's 14".

Rod and his second wife hoped to visit Springfield, but Dee Dee repeatedly changed plans. She allegedly told neighbors that Gypsy's father was an abusive drug addict and alcoholic who had never accepted his daughter's health issues and had never provided financial support.

Gypsy (unknown date)

Many people who met Gypsy-Rose were charmed by her. Her 5-foot (150 cm) height, (Note: The Missouri Department of Corrections lists her as one inch shorter, or 148 cm, and weighing 100 pounds (45 kg)) nearly toothless mouth, large glasses, and high, childlike voice reinforced the perception that she had the medical problems her mother described. Dee Dee regularly shaved Gypsy's head to mimic the appearance of a chemotherapy patient, allegedly telling her that medication would eventually cause her hair to fall out and that shaving it in advance was easier. Gypsy often wore wigs or hats to cover her baldness. When they left the house, Dee Dee frequently brought an oxygen tank and feeding tube, and Gypsy was fed the children's liquid nutrition supplement PediaSure well into her twenties.

Medical interventions continued. Dee Dee had some of Gypsy's saliva glands treated with Botox and later removed entirely to address her purported drooling. Gypsy later claimed that Dee Dee induced drooling by applying a topical anesthetic to numb her gums before doctor visits. Tubes were implanted in Gypsy's ears to treat her many purported ear infections.

In her memoir, The Prison Confessions of Gypsy‑Rose, Gypsy wrote that she developed an addiction to pain medication beginning at age sixteen.

=== Suspicions of deceptive behavior ===
In September 2007, Bernardo Flasterstein, a pediatric neurologist who examined Gypsy in Springfield, became suspicious of her reported muscular dystrophy diagnosis. He ordered MRIs and blood tests, which showed no abnormalities. "I don't see any reason why she doesn't walk," he told Dee Dee on a follow-up visit after observing Gypsy stand and support her own weight. Flasterstein noted that Dee Dee was not a reliable historian. After contacting Gypsy's physicians in New Orleans, he learned that her original muscle biopsy had been negative, contradicting Dee Dee's claims of muscular dystrophy and her assertion that all medical records had been destroyed in flooding. He suspected the possibility of factitious disorder imposed on another (FDIA). Dee Dee later obtained access to Flasterstein's notes and stopped taking Gypsy to see him.

Flasterstein did not report Dee Dee to social services. He later said that other physicians advised him to treat the pair with "golden gloves" and that he doubted authorities would believe him. In late October 2009, an anonymous caller (Note: Flasterstein denies it was him.) informed police that Dee Dee used multiple names and birthdates for herself and Gypsy, and suggested that Gypsy was healthier than claimed. Officers conducted a wellness check but accepted Dee Dee's explanation that she used false information to avoid an abusive ex‑husband. Without contacting Rod, they concluded that Gypsy appeared genuinely mentally disabled, and the file was closed.

In 2024, April "Fancy" Macelli, a former associate of the Blanchard family who had been given access to Blanchard's private medical records and other case material, publicly expressed doubts that Dee Dee had Munchausen syndrome by proxy. Macelli claimed that the diagnosis had been promoted by Blanchard's stepmother, Kristy.

=== Gypsy's growing independence ===
Dee Dee appears to have forged at least one copy of Gypsy's birth certificate, altering the birth year to 1995 to support claims that she was still a teenager. Gypsy later said she was unsure of her real age for 14 years. Dee Dee sometimes claimed that the original certificate had been destroyed during post‑Katrina flooding. She kept another copy with the correct birthdate; Gypsy recalled seeing it during a hospital visit and becoming confused, and Dee Dee told her it was a misprint.

In February 2011, at a science‑fiction convention, Gypsy attempted to escape. Her mother found her with a man named Dan, whom she had met online and arranged to meet at the event. Accounts of the incident differ. In one version, attendees who believed Gypsy was 15 and the man was 35 became concerned after finding her in his hotel room. Neighbors later said that Dee Dee produced paperwork with a false birthdate and threatened to contact police, prompting the man to let Gypsy go.

In the other version, Gypsy said she had learned she was actually 19 and planned to run away with Dan to Arkansas. She said she left a note for Dee Dee stating she wanted to be independent and hitchhiked at 2 a.m. to a friend's house, only to discover that Dan was on parole and could not leave the state. Gypsy said Dee Dee found her because she had left her phone behind. According to Gypsy, she returned willingly after Dee Dee promised she could continue the relationship. Gypsy alleged that afterward, Dee Dee smashed her computer and phone with a hammer and threatened to break her fingers if she tried to escape again. Gypsy claimed she was leashed and handcuffed to her bed and that Dee Dee starved her for two weeks. Dee Dee later told her she had filed paperwork declaring Gypsy mentally incompetent, leading Gypsy to believe that police would not believe her if she sought help.

During court testimony, Dan stated he kept in contact with Gypsy via video chat and they would send explicit videos to each other. He claims they role-played occasionally and that he developed a taste for power exchange role-playing from Gypsy. He also stated Gypsy would send nude photos, dress up in costumes, and use various fictitious names.

In June 2011, Gypsy attempted another escape by shooting her mother ten times with a BB gun, which she initially believed was a real firearm. Dee Dee told others that the injuries resulted from a robbery attempt at a nearby Walmart. Around this time, Gypsy hid from her mother to use the computer. She later said she shared sexually explicit images of herself online because it made her feel better about her appearance.

In February 2012, police were called after Dee Dee and Gypsy were caught shoplifting $21.53 worth of arts‑and‑crafts items from a Hobby Lobby. The items had been hidden under Gypsy's legs in the wheelchair. Dee Dee told officers they had just returned from Disney World and planned to make a scrapbook, and that the theft was accidental.

Around 2012, Gypsy, who continued using the Internet after Dee Dee went to bed to avoid her supervision, made contact online with Nicholas Godejohn of Big Bend, Wisconsin, whom she said she met on a Christian singles website. Godejohn has an IQ of 82 and a history of mental illness, sometimes reported as dissociative identity disorder, and has autism spectrum disorder.

Gypsy and Godejohn exchanged over 100 videos during their online relationship. In one video, in which Gypsy is using one of her multiple personas, she says the following about the children they may have together:

The plan for if we have a boy first, we're going to protect him and our children from the outside world, because they can't know about you being a vampire. If we have a girl, the way it has to be, she has to lose her virginity to you because you are the master of the household. I will have to explain that to her when she's of an age where it's time to explain it, like not when she's 7, more like around 13.

In 2014, Gypsy—who maintained five Facebook accounts—confided to her 23‑year‑old neighbor, Aleah Woodmansee, that she and Godejohn flirted online and that their exchanges included BDSM elements, which Gypsy said reflected his interests more than hers. Aleah considered herself a "big sister" to Gypsy but later learned they were close in age. Gypsy and Godejohn discussed eloping and chose names for potential children. Aleah tried to dissuade her, believing she was too young and possibly being manipulated by a sexual predator. She viewed Gypsy's plans as "fantasies and dreams" and did not think they would materialize. Despite Dee Dee's alleged attempts to restrict her Internet access—including destroying her phone and laptop and allegedly locking her in a backyard shed—Gypsy maintained contact with Aleah, who saved printouts of her posts, until 2014.

The following year, Gypsy arranged and paid for Godejohn to meet her mother in Springfield. Her plan was for him to "bump into" them at a movie theater while they were in costume, and then gradually form a relationship that Dee Dee would accept. When they met in person for the first time in March 2015, during a showing of Cinderella, Godejohn said Gypsy led him to a bathroom stall where they had sexual intercourse.

The two continued communicating online and began developing a plan to kill Dee Dee. Godejohn claims that Gypsy made it clear to him that as long as Dee Dee was alive, they couldn't be together and told him that getting rid of her was the only option. Gypsy admitted she "talked [Godejohn] into it [the murder plot]", at one point allegedly texting him, "For motivation sake bring your A game hun. This is life with me on the line".

Less than a month before the murder, Gypsy sent Godejohn a video of her walking into her mother's room, pointing at Dee Dee's pillow and making a stabbing motion.

== Murder ==
On the day of the murder, Gypsy texted Godejohn, "The ***** gonna go down tonight…just the gloves and knife?'" Godejohn responded, "…duct tape too…to muffle her." Gypsy said she would "precut" the tape.

After receiving money that Gypsy had stolen and mailed to him to purchase a bus ticket, Godejohn returned to Springfield in June 2015, arriving a day after Gypsy and Dee Dee had been at the emergency room to have Gypsy's feeding tube replaced. That same day, after the two returned home from a Dollar General they had an argument, reconciled, and spent the evening painting each other's nails. Gypsy stated that the last words her mother said to her were, "I'm starting to feel more relaxed. Don't hurt me".

After Dee Dee went to sleep, Godejohn went to the Blanchard house where Gypsy let him inside and gave him duct tape, gloves, and a knife that she had shoplifted from Walmart on the understanding that he would use it to kill Dee Dee.

Gypsy later said she hid in the bathroom and covered her ears so she would not hear her mother screaming, although Godejohn claims she was shaving her legs. Godejohn stabbed Dee Dee 17 times in the back while she slept. Afterward, he claimed that he and Gypsy had sexual intercourse in her bedroom. Gypsy alleged that Godejohn raped her and that the encounter was nonconsensual, saying she cried out for her deceased mother during the assault. Gypsy later told authorities she cleaned up some of her mother's blood using baby wipes.

The pair took more than $4,400 in cash that Dee Dee kept in the house. They fled to a motel outside Springfield, where they stayed for several days while planning their next steps; during that time, they were recorded on security cameras at multiple stores. In a later interview, Godejohn said, "I felt horrible about it. When me and her were in the hotel room… [Gypsy] kept on telling me, 'Stop crying, stop crying. There's no reason to cry. It was my idea, it wasn't yours.' [Gypsy] comforted me about it. I prayed once I got here. I tried to get her mother's soul to forgive me." Gypsy said she believed at that point that they had gotten away with the crime. One taxi driver who picked the pair up said of Gypsy, "The girl looked 12, sounded five and have a 40-year-old attitude. She was not afraid to tell me off. I just knew there was something wrong."

They mailed the murder weapon to Godejohn's home in Wisconsin to avoid being found with it, then took a bus there. In a video recorded by Gypsy of the pair in a hotel room the day after the murder, Gypsy can be heard laughing and says about Godejohn, "He's eating a brownie, but later he will be eating me."

== Investigation and arrests ==
After concerning Facebook posts appeared on Dee Dee's account and phone calls went unanswered, several friends and neighbors went to the Blanchard home. Although the two often left for medical trips without notice, Dee Dee's modified car was still in the driveway, making that explanation unlikely. Protective film on the windows made it difficult to see inside in the low light. When no one answered the door, the group called 9‑1‑1. Police arrived but had to wait for a search warrant before entering; they allowed a neighbor to climb through a window, where he saw that the house was largely undisturbed and that Gypsy's wheelchairs were still present.

Once the warrant was issued, officers entered the home and found Dee Dee's body. A GoFundMe account was created to help cover funeral expenses and, if necessary, costs related to Gypsy. Acquaintances feared that even if Gypsy had not been harmed, she would be helpless without her wheelchair, medications, and support equipment such as oxygen tanks and her feeding tube.

Woodmansee, who was among those gathered outside the home, told police what she knew about Gypsy's secret boyfriend and showed them the printouts she had saved, which included his name. Using that information, investigators traced an IP address to Wisconsin. The following day, law‑enforcement agencies in Waukesha County raided Godejohn's home in Big Bend. Godejohn and Gypsy surrendered and were taken into custody on charges of murder and felony armed criminal action.

News that Gypsy was alive was met with relief in Springfield, where she and Godejohn were soon extradited and held on $1 million bond. In announcing the development, Greene County Sheriff Jim Arnott cautioned that "things are not always what they appear." Local media soon reported that Gypsy had never been sick and had always been able to walk, but that her mother had allegedly forced her to pretend otherwise. Arnott urged the public not to donate money to the family until investigators determined the extent of the fraud.

An unsealed search warrant showed that Gypsy had at least five Facebook accounts. "Nick told investigators Gypsy had so many different Facebook accounts he could not remember all of them." The accounts—Nicholas Godejohn, Nicholas Bella Rose, Snowgypsy Blanchard, Gypsy's Trip, Praying for DeeDee and Gypsy, Bella Rose, and Gypsy Rose—were requested for search, along with any additional accounts linked to Gypsy's email addresses. "Previous warrants say friends told investigators Gypsy had alternate Facebook accounts under the names Emma Rose and Demona LoveSlave where she reportedly 'liked' pictures of sadomasochism."

As shown in the documentary Mommy Dead and Dearest, Blanchard made several statements later shown to be untrue. In post-arrest interrogation footage, she denied any involvement in her mother's killing, repeatedly responding "No, sir" when asked if she had committed or assisted in the murder of Dee Dee. She also stated, "I'm innocent. What they say on the news is not true."

== Trials ==
After the disclosure of how Dee Dee allegedly treated Gypsy, public sympathy shifted from Dee Dee as the victim of a violent murder to Gypsy as a long‑term victim of child abuse. Although first-degree murder can carry the death penalty or life without parole under Missouri law, County Prosecutor Dan Patterson announced that he would not seek the death penalty for either Gypsy or Godejohn, calling the case "extraordinary and unusual". After Gypsy's attorney obtained her medical records from Louisiana, he secured a plea agreement for second-degree murder. Her lawyer told BuzzFeed that she had been so undernourished that she gained 14 pounds (6.4 kg) during her first year in the county jail, in contrast to most of his clients who typically lose weight. In July 2016, Gypsy accepted the plea deal and was sentenced to ten years in prison.

Godejohn continued to face the more severe charge because prosecutors argued that he initiated the murder plot, and both he and Gypsy acknowledged that he killed Dee Dee. Prosecutors also pursued a harsher case against him due to his lack of involvement in the alleged abuse. Gypsy's plea agreement did not require her to testify against him. In January 2017, his trial was postponed after prosecutors requested a second psychiatric evaluation; his attorneys argued that he had an IQ of 82 and was on the autism spectrum, suggesting diminished capacity. He initially waived his right to a jury trial, but reversed that decision in June 2017. In an interview prior to his trial Godejohn stated, "All the planning, she did every bit of it," Godejohn said. "She pretty much willed the knife in my hand to commit the deed herself. She is the mastermind behind the entire thing. As far as I'm concerned, she's as guilty as I am."

At trial, Godejohn stated that he asked Gypsy to run away with him instead on the day of the murder and that she refused and said she wanted him to kill her mother.

In December 2017, the judge scheduled Godejohn's trial for November 2018. In opening statements, prosecutors alleged that he had deliberated for more than a year before the killing, while his defense argued that Gypsy had formulated the plan and that their client, who was autistic, acted out of infatuation. The next day, prosecutors presented text messages—some sexually explicit—that Gypsy and Godejohn exchanged in the week before the murder, often using alternate personas, along with the knife used in the killing. In several messages, he asked for details about Dee Dee's bedroom and sleeping habits. A video of Gypsy role-playing as 'Demona' sent to Godejohn was played for the court. In this video, Gypsy calls Godejohn her slave and outlines the consequences if he does not obey her, including not having contact with Gypsy. Godejohn's lawyers claimed that the threats that 'Demona' made to Godejohn were dangerous, and that the video of instructions and text messages programmed Godejohn to kill Dee Dee Blanchard or lose Gypsy. Jurors also viewed video of his police interview, in which he admitted to the killing.

Gypsy testified on the third day of the trial. She said that although she suggested to Godejohn that he kill Dee Dee to end her mother's abuse, she also considered becoming pregnant by him in the hope that Dee Dee would accept him if she were carrying his child. She said she stole baby clothes from Walmart to prepare for either plan, but that Godejohn never told her what he thought about the pregnancy idea.

After four days of testimony, the case went to the jury. Jurors were instructed that they could find Godejohn guilty of involuntary manslaughter, second‑degree murder, first‑degree murder, or not guilty. After approximately two hours of deliberation, they found him guilty of first‑degree murder and armed criminal action. In February 2019, he was sentenced to life in prison for the murder conviction, the only possible sentence since prosecutors had declined to seek the death penalty. He asked Judge David Jones for leniency on the armed criminal action charge, which carries a minimum sentence of three years, saying he had fallen "blindly in love" with Gypsy. He received a concurrent 25‑year sentence.

Jones also denied a motion for a new trial filed by Godejohn's attorney, Dewayne Perry. Perry argued that the jury should not have heard that Godejohn had considered raping Dee Dee on the night of the murder, and that the state's psychologist should not have been allowed to testify while the defense psychologist was excluded. Jones acknowledged that an appeals court might view the latter issue as significant and potentially reversible. Defence attorney Andrew Mead stated that evidence from the case of Gypsy, also relevant to Godejohn, was leaked to the media at her request. Mead was also questioned about why he did not ask prospective jurors about exposure to pretrial media, including Gypsy's Revenge, a documentary about the murder which includes interviews with Gypsy which aired shortly before jury selection; Mead said he did not recall the timing of its premiere. At Godejohn's appeal hearing, videos were shown that depicted Gypsy emotionally manipulating him and an instructional video demonstrating how to stab Dee Dee; questions were raised about why these had not been used at trial.

In late 2023, public defender Tyler Coyle filed an appeal seeking a new trial for Godejohn. No timeline has been set for when the courts will review the request.

== Aftermath and reactions ==
=== Community response ===
Neighbors were shocked to learn that Gypsy's illnesses had been fabricated. Woodmansee—whose information about Gypsy's relationship with Godejohn helped police locate the pair the day after Dee Dee's body was discovered—said she cried in disbelief upon hearing that Gypsy had never been sick or disabled. Her mother recalled how readily everyone accepted Dee Dee's claims without asking for proof, and wondered whether Dee Dee and Gypsy had secretly laughed at their neighbors' naïveté. Kim Blanchard (no relation), who had called sheriff's deputies to the house the previous night, said, "What have I been believing? How could I have been so stupid?" More than 60 people attended a candlelight vigil for Dee Dee in downtown Springfield the night after her body was found.

At a news conference, Sheriff Jim Arnott said of the case: "[Springfield is] a giving community, we surround people with love and finances that we believe that needs it. However, a lot of times we are deceived, and I think this is now so true, in this case at hand." Only one of the charities that had assisted the Blanchards commented publicly after the revelations. A spokesman for Habitat for Humanity, whose volunteers built the Blanchards' home, said, "We are just really, deeply saddened by the whole situation."

Journalist Michelle Dean, who covered the case for Buzzfeed said "I do think Gypsy is potentially dangerous. Dee Dee was a master manipulator. It's impossible that Gypsy would not have picked this up and used it."

=== Family ===
Dee Dee's family in Louisiana, who said they had confronted her years earlier about her treatment of Gypsy, did not mourn her. Her father, stepmother, and the nephew who first revealed Gypsy's true health status when she began using a wheelchair all later said that Dee Dee "deserved her fate" and that Gypsy had already been punished enough. None offered to pay for her funeral, and Dee Dee's father and stepmother claimed to have flushed her ashes down the toilet. In 2024, Gypsy said the ashes were still with her mother's family and asked that Dee Dee be buried with her own mother, as Dee Dee had always requested.

Rod Blanchard, Gypsy's father, was more forgiving. "I think Dee Dee's problem was she started a web of lies, and there was no escaping after," he told BuzzFeed. "[I]t was like a tornado got started." He said he was happy the first time he saw video of Gypsy walking on her own.

=== Gypsy after serving her sentence ===
I feel like I'm more free in prison than with living with my mom. Because now I'm allowed to just live like a normal woman.

— Gypsy-Rose Blanchard, 20/20, January 4, 2018

Gypsy served her sentence at Missouri's Chillicothe Correctional Center, and did not speak to the media until after accepting her plea. She told BuzzFeed reporter Michelle Dean that she had researched Munchausen syndrome by proxy—now known as factitious disorder imposed on another—on prison computers and believed her mother exhibited every symptom. "I think she would have been the perfect mom for someone that actually was sick," she said. She believed Dee Dee's claim that she had cancer, even though she knew she could walk and eat solid food, which led her to consent to regular head‑shaving. She said she always hoped doctors would see through the deception and was frustrated that only Dr. Flasterstein did.

When asked what made her want to escape, Gypsy cited the 2011 science‑fiction convention incident, which made her question why she was not allowed to have friends like others her age. She has said she hopes to help other victims of abuse.

On September 29, 2023, the Missouri Department of Corrections confirmed that Gypsy had been granted parole. She was released on December 28, 2023, in accordance with state law.

On June 27, 2022, she married Ryan Scott Anderson, though the couple separated three months after her release from prison in March 2024.

Blanchard and Ken Urker had originally met in 2017, when he began corresponding with her while she was incarcerated; they became engaged during a 2018 prison visit but ended the relationship the following year. In April 2024, Blanchard resumed a relationship with Urker. Urker died on October 1, 2026, his 34th birthday, with Blanchard informing TMZ of his death and her suspicions about its cause just hours later. Urker's death is currently under investigation by the Lafourche Parish Sheriff's Office.

Since her release from prison, Gypsy has become a public figure through multiple media projects, including interviews, documentaries, and a memoir. Her public profile has led to controversy including accusations that she has profited from her crime.

In March 2024, Blanchard faced criticism for claiming she did not "identify as a murderer", during an interview on the Viall Files podcast.

In March 2026, Blanchard sparked outrage when she created a TikTok video showing her making a joke about her involvement in the murder of her mother.

=== Medical community ===
Flasterstein, the pediatric neurologist who had concluded that Gypsy could walk independently and noted in her chart that he suspected Munchausen by proxy, later said it was only the second such potential case he had encountered. He learned of Dee Dee's murder in 2015, when a former nurse emailed him a news report about it. "Poor Gypsy," he said. "She suffered all those years, and for no reason." He told Dean that he wished he could have done more.

In an interview with Vulture about Erin Lee Carr's HBO documentary Mommy Dead and Dearest, FDIA expert Marc Feldman criticized Carr for portraying Flasterstein as the story's hero. "[H]e had a gross misunderstanding of his obligations as a physician, as well as the legal requirements to report suspected abuse or neglect," Feldman said. The film accepts Flasterstein's assertion that he was required to notify Child Protective Services only in cases of suspected neglect, but Feldman argued that once Flasterstein listed Munchausen by proxy among his possible diagnoses, he was legally obligated to file a report. "This conundrum arises in case after case, where innumerable doctors have evaluated the patient, perhaps had questions they kept to themselves, and just proceeded to treat or make referrals and ditch the case that way."

Although a formal diagnosis of FDIA for Dee Dee is impossible, Feldman told the Springfield News‑Leader after Gypsy's guilty plea that, based on publicly reported information, he believed Dee Dee Blanchard likely met criteria for the disorder. "Gypsy was infantilized and kept away from her peers," he said. "She was little more than a tool for Dee Dee to navigate through the world the way she wanted to." He described the case as "unprecedented" in his 24 years of researching FDIA, noting that he had never before encountered an instance in which an abused child killed the abusive parent. Feldman also stated that Godejohn may have been strongly influenced by Gypsy in ways that have not yet been made public. Speaking hypothetically, Feldman asked, "What person who is told to kill another person would do it, with no experience of that victim — or very limited experience of that victim?"

The idea that Gypsy allegedly handed Godejohn a knife, said, "kill my mother," and he did it, seems overly simplistic to Feldman. "There's obviously a lot more complexity to it," he said, referring to Godejohn's state of mind.

== In popular culture ==
=== Films ===
HBO released the documentary Mommy Dead and Dearest (2017), directed by Erin Lee Carr, which examines the murder and includes interrogation footage as well as exclusive interviews with Godejohn and Gypsy.

=== Television ===
On August 13, 2017, the Sony Entertainment Television series CID aired an episode titled "Death on Social Media", based on the case and relocated to India. According to Sony, the characters Aria and Aanchal were based on Gypsy and her mother, Dee Dee Blanchard, respectively.

On November 21, 2017, the CBS Television Distribution talk show Dr. Phil, aired the episode "Mother Knows Best: A Story of Munchausen by Proxy and Murder", featuring interviews with Gypsy, her father Rod Blanchard, and her stepmother.

On January 5, 2018, The American Broadcasting Company (ABC) news and information series Good Morning America aired an exclusive in-prison interview with Gypsy, in a segment entitled "Mother of All Murders".

That same day; the ABC network news magazine series 20/20 episode "The Story of Gypsy Blanchard". It consisted of Gypsy's first network interview from prison as well as an interview with Godejohn.

On January 29, 2018, the Investigation Discovery channel series James Patterson's Murder is Forever episode "Mother of All Murders" aired.

On November 6, 2018, Investigation Discovery aired a two-hour documentary titled Gypsy's Revenge. Gypsy was interviewed while incarcerated. During the interview, she describes her relationship with Dee Dee. Rod, various relatives, friends, public officials and Godejohn are all interviewed.

On January 26, 2019, Love You to Death aired on Lifetime, dramatizing the case as "inspired by true events". Marcia Gay Harden starred as Dee Dee, Emily Skeggs as Gypsy, Brennan Keel Cook starred as Nick, and Tate Donovan starred as Rod. Skeggs had to wear a bald cap for most of the scenes where her character was hairless. "[W]hen I think about it, every teenager wants to murder their parents at some point," Harden told TV Insider.

On March 20, 2019, the streaming service Hulu announced the true crime series The Act. The eight-episode miniseries is based on Michelle Dean's 2016 BuzzFeed article. Dean was an executive producer and writer for the first season. Joey King played Gypsy and received an Emmy nomination for her performance; she shaved her head for the role. Patricia Arquette played Dee Dee and won an Emmy for her performance. Kristy Blanchard, Gypsy's stepmother, claims that Michelle Dean told her telephonically that Blanchard would get 50% of the money made from the show. Despite this, Gypsy, appearing upset about the show, threatened to sue over not giving consent to use her name and life story, but took no legal action, and it is reported that Gypsy said that out of anger.

On July 13, 2019, Oxygen network aired the Snapped: Killer Couples episode "Gypsy Rose & Nick: A Love to Kill For". It examines the relationship of Gypsy and Godejohn and features an interview with Godejohn from prison.

In the Netflix web television series The Politician, the characters Infinity Jackson, Ricardo, and Dusty Jackson are respectively based on Gypsy Blanchard, Nicholas Godejohn and Dee Dee Blanchard.

On January 5, 2024, about a week after Blanchard's prison release, Lifetime released a six-part docu-series titled The Prison Confessions of Gypsy Rose Blanchard.

== See also ==
- Wendi Michelle Scott, a Maryland woman with Munchausen by proxy who injected her four-year-old daughter with magnesium in 2007 and was sentenced to prison in 2008
- Garnett Spears, a New York boy whose mother also had Munchausen by proxy, leading her to fatally poison him with table salt in 2014
- Shauna Taylor, a Florida woman with Munchausen by proxy who deliberately destroyed her child's liver with over-the-counter drugs in 2013
