= Natalie Reynolds =

American social media personality

- Born: January 17, 2003 (age 23)
- Occupations: Social media personality; content creator
- Years active: 2022–present

Natalie Reynolds (born January 17, 2003) is an American social media personality, livestreamer, and content creator. Reynolds had attracted widespread media attention for a series of controversial stunts and live streams, including a widely criticized incident at Lady Bird Lake in which she encouraged and convinced a woman, widely reported to be homeless, to enter the body of water during a live, in exchange for a payment that was never processed, even after being told she could not swim. In 2025, she received international coverage after videos of her crying outside TikTok's headquarters following the suspension of her account went viral. She faked being on parole and wore a fake ankle monitor throughout some of her videos and making skits of a life with it. She also has made posts people claim to be racist, and is mostly known for copying other people’s videos and almost never had her own concept.

== Career ==
Reynolds began posting videos on TikTok in 2022, initially uploading lip-sync and dance content before expanding into prank videos, relationship comedy, and challenge-based content. She later expanded her presence to YouTube, Instagram, and Kick, where she livestreams. Following the suspension of her main TikTok account in 2025, she continued creating content on Instagram and Kick.

=== Product ventures ===
In October 2025, Reynolds released a limited-edition merchandise product marketed as “ritual bathwater,” a red-tinted liquid sold in small glass vials through a personal website. The product was priced at $49.99 per unit and limited to approximately 100 units, which sold out within hours of release.

Reynolds promoted the product as a symbolic “ritual in a jar,” describing it as a form of creator-fan intimacy and personalized branding. Marketing materials referenced concepts such as “divine feminine energy” and included wellness-adjacent language. The product page also contained disclaimers stating it was not intended for consumption and had not been evaluated by the Food and Drug Administration (FDA).

=== Collaboration with Gypsy-Rose Blanchard ===
In March 2026, a TikTok collaboration between Reynolds and Gypsy-Rose Blanchard drew criticism after Blanchard referenced her role in the killing of her mother during a viral “We listen, and we don’t judge” trend video.

== Controversies ==
=== Bodypaint social experiment ===
In December 2023, Natalie Reynolds drew widespread online attention after posting a video of herself entering a gym wearing body paint designed to resemble athletic clothing, creating the appearance of being nearly nude despite claiming she was covered. The stunt was presented as a deliberate social experiment and piece of content creation, with Reynolds documenting both the lengthy preparation process and the reactions she received from people inside the gym.

Footage and reporting describe her walking through the gym while being confronted by staff or gym members who argued that her appearance violated dress code expectations and basic standards of appropriateness in a shared workout space.

Reynolds, however, maintained that she was technically clothed, repeatedly arguing that she was wearing a sports bra and bikini-style bottoms underneath the paint and insisting that her outfit should not be interpreted as nudity.

=== Livestream shark incident ===
In April 2024, videos circulated online showing Reynolds participating in an IRL livestream on Kick during which she and a group of friends attempted to catch sharks at a beach. After an initial unsuccessful attempt the previous night, the group returned and set up fishing equipment before successfully catching a shark during the livestream.

Following the capture, Reynolds and her friends brought the shark into shallow water, where she posed for photos and briefly sat on the animal while it was restrained for the livestream. The footage showed the shark being held in place while content was recorded for the livestream. The animal was later released back into the water.

After the incident, Reynolds stated in a livestream response that she had sustained minor injuries from contact with the shark, describing cuts caused by its rough skin while she was sitting on it.

=== Lady Bird Lake incident ===
In May 2024, Reynolds received widespread criticism after livestreaming an incident at Lady Bird Lake in Austin, Texas, in which she offered a woman $20 to jump into the lake as part of a purported scavenger hunt. After the woman entered the water, she called for help while Reynolds and her friends left the area. A fire truck was later seen arriving at the scene.

The Austin Police Department confirmed that officers responded to the incident but that no report was filed. According to police, the woman was provided clothing and transportation home, and no criminal charges were filed. Police also cautioned against participating in online challenges or pranks that could result in serious injury or death.

Reynolds later disputed accusations that the woman had been drowning, stating during a subsequent livestream that the woman "wasn't drowning" and claiming she believed the woman was under the influence of drugs.

=== Allegations of employee payment withholdment ===
In July 2024, Reynolds was accused by a former associate of failing to pay agreed-upon wages and legal expenses following a failed content production involving a staged “prank” in which a van was painted with the phrase “free candy.” The group was reportedly stopped by police during the stunt, resulting in arrests and legal issues for those involved.

A former collaborator, Josiah Banks, alleged that Reynolds had promised to cover his legal fees and provide a monthly payment of approximately $4,700, but later did not fulfill these commitments when legal costs arose. He further claimed that wage deductions were made to offset expenses related to the incident. Reynolds denied the allegations.

=== Demonstration at TikTok headquarters ===
On June 9, 2025, Reynolds appeared outside TikTok's headquarters after her main TikTok account was suspended. Videos circulated on social media showing her crying, speaking on the phone, knocking on the building's doors, and pleading to be allowed inside in an effort to have her account reinstated.

=== No-show meet-and-greet ===
In October 2025, videos circulated online showing Reynolds standing alone at a planned public meet-and-greet with no attendees present. The clips, widely shared on TikTok, depicted her waiting with security personnel while no fans arrived, quickly drawing millions of views and speculation that the event had been staged as a publicity stunt.

Reynolds later addressed the incident in a TikTok video, stating she had expected a large turnout but that no one attended, describing it as “the most humiliating” experience of her life.

=== The Cat in the Hat costume ===
In September 2026, Reynolds attracted attention after purchasing the screen-used Cat in the Hat costume worn by Mike Myers in the 2003 film The Cat in the Hat for approximately $25,000. Following the purchase, Reynolds claimed that the costume was haunted and that Myers' "soul was apparently trapped inside" it. She also alleged that a previous owner had warned her against looking directly into the costume's eyes. Reynolds subsequently posted videos showing the costume inside a glass display case at her home, describing it as one of the most haunted props in movie history.

The incident prompted backlash on social media, with some users criticising Reynolds for frightening members of the public and using the costume to generate attention. Her apology video, published on 11 September 2026, received further attention after Reynolds stated that she had initially considered chasing people to be humorous, but later recognised that her actions had caused others to fear for their safety. She also claimed that she believed the costume had influenced her behaviour, a statement that was met with scepticism by some viewers.

The controversy occurred amid a wider wave of online panic surrounding the Cat in the Hat character. In August 2026, AI-generated images and videos depicting the character appearing in residential streets across the United Kingdom and Ireland circulated widely on TikTok and Facebook. The posts caused concern among some residents, particularly parents and teenagers, with police in Ireland and the United Kingdom publicly confirming that the purported sightings were fabricated. Wexford Gardaí specifically addressed the rumours, stating that the images and videos had been created using artificial intelligence.

The trend subsequently attracted further criticism after reports emerged of threatening posts targeting schools and communities in the United States. Authorities warned that although some content was intended as a joke, posts that caused people to fear for their safety could have legal consequences. The wider phenomenon contributed to criticism of the use of the character in pranks and fear-based social media content.

== Personal life ==
Reynolds is based in Los Angeles. Her boyfriend is named Zachary Huelsman.
