= Love You to Death (2019 film) =

2019 American television film

- Poster
- Written by: Anthony Jaswinski
- Directed by: Alex Kalymnios
- Starring: Marcia Gay Harden; Emily Skeggs; Brennan Keel Cook; Garfield Wilson; Kayla Deorksen; Heather Doerksen; Tate Donovan
- Music by: Amie Doherty
- Country of origin: United States
- Original language: English

Production
- Production company: Sony Pictures Television

Original release
- Network: Lifetime
- Release: January 26, 2019

Love You to Death is a 2019 crime drama film that aired on Lifetime. The film is inspired by the murder of Dee Dee Blanchard and stars Marcia Gay Harden, Emily Skeggs, Brennan Keel Cook, Garfield Wilson, Kayla Deorksen, Heather Doerksen, and Tate Donovan.

On January 27, 2019, a "special edition" of the film was aired that featured behind-the-scene interviews with Harden and Skeggs.

== Plot ==
Camile Stoller (Marcia Gay Harden) is the mother of a sickly girl named Esme (Emily Skeggs). Their relationship turns fatal when Camile is found to have been stabbed to death and Esme is missing.

== Cast ==
- Marcia Gay Harden as Camile Stoller, a woman who is inspired by Dee Dee Blanchard
- Emily Skeggs as Esme Stoller, the sickly daughter of Camile who is inspired by Gypsy Rose Blanchard. Skeggs had to wear a bald cap in most of the scenes where Esme was hairless.
  - Nevis Unipan portrays a younger Esme. Unipan wore a bald cap in most of the scenes where Esme was hairless.
- Tate Donovan as Travis Stoller, the estranged father of Esme who is inspired by Rod Blanchard
- Brennan Keel Cook as Scott, the love interest of Esme who is inspired by Nick Godejohn
- Kayla Deorksen as Denise
- Kurt Ostlund as Alan
- Kendall Cross
- Garfield Wilson as Dr. Price
- Heather Doerksen as Dr. Yarrow

== Production ==
Harden was brought on to portray the character of Camile, who is based on Dee Dee Blanchard. Harden was not aware of Blanchard's murder and had not heard of Munchausen's syndrome by proxy, whereas her co-star Emily Skeggs was familiar with both as she was a fan of true crime. While filming Skeggs spent about two and a half hours each day getting the bald cap applied to her head while Harden had to wear body padding for portions of the movie.

== Release ==
Love You to Death first aired on the Lifetime channel on January 26, 2019.
