= Mommy Dead and Dearest =

- Based on: Murder of Dee Dee Blanchard
- Directed by: Erin Lee Carr
- Composer: Ian Hultquist
- Country of origin: United States

Production
- Producers: Andrew Rossi; Alison Byrne
- Cinematography: Bryan Sarkinen
- Editor: Andrew Coffman
- Running time: 82 minutes

Original release
- Network: HBO
- Release: May 16, 2017

Mommy Dead and Dearest is a 2017 American documentary film directed by Erin Lee Carr about the murder of Dee Dee Blanchard. Her daughter, Gypsy Rose Blanchard, and Gypsy's boyfriend, Nicholas Godejohn pleaded guilty and were convicted, respectively. The documentary debuted on HBO on May 16, 2017.

The documentary explores the murder and its aftermath, while also exploring the alleged abuse that Gypsy suffered at the hands of her mother, who convinced many that Gypsy suffered from a variety of illnesses. The documentary also examines the claims Dee Dee made about Gypsy's health.

Godejohn was sentenced to life in prison for first-degree murder and armed criminal action.

Gypsy Rose Blanchard received a lesser sentence of 10 years and was paroled after serving 8 years.

== Synopsis ==
The film focuses on the murder of Dee Dee Blanchard, for which Gypsy-Rose Blanchard and Nicholas Godejohn were both suspects. It takes place in Springfield, Missouri in June 2015. Detailed evidence about the case is told through interviews, court footage, family records, and medical records.

Gypsy, in her early 20's, was previously seen using a wheelchair, a feeding tube, a breathing machine, and her head was shaved bald. Dee Dee's behavior is believed to have stemmed from Munchausen Syndrome by proxy, allegedly forcing her care and illness on her daughter.

Around 2012, Gypsy made contact online with Nicholas Godejohn of Big Bend, Wisconsin, whom she said she met on a Christian singles website. The two communicated online and began developing a plan to kill Dee Dee.

== Cast ==
- Rod Blanchard, Gypsy-Rose Blanchard's biological father
- Kristy Blanchard, married to Rod Blanchard; stepmother of Gypsy-Rose Blanchard
- Jim Arnott, Greene County Sheriff; first elected in 2008, re-elected for a second term in 2012, and for a third term in 2016
- Dr. Marc Feldman, "leading expert on the condition [(Munchausen by proxy)] and prominent on-camera presence in Mommy Dead and Dearest"
- Bernard Flatersten, pediatric neurologist
- Gypsy-Rose Blanchard, the daughter convicted of murdering her mother in 2015
- Nicholas Godejohn, ex-boyfriend of Gypsy-Rose, convicted of killing Dee Dee Blanchard
- Emma Pitre, Gypsy-Rose's grandmother, mother of Dee Dee Blanchard
- Clauddinea "Dee Dee" Blanchard, mother and victim of Gypsy-Rose

== Background and history ==
For many years before the murder, Gypsy and Dee Dee lived alone in a small house located in Springfield, Missouri. Dee Dee, Gypsy's mother, didn't have a job, but served as a full-time caretaker for her daughter. A former friend of Dee Dee's told BuzzFeed News article writer, Michelle Dean, that the neighbors liked them; once you met them, they were impossible to forget.

Following the birth of her daughter, Dee Dee increasingly represented Gypsy Rose Blanchard as suffering from multiple serious medical conditions which she attributed to an unspecified chromosomal disorder. In 2012, Gypsy was diagnosed with 1q21.1 deletion syndrome which can increase the risk of delayed development, intellectual disability, physical abnormalities, and neurological and psychiatric problems.

Kim Blanchard, a close relative and neighbor, was one of the first individuals to react to what Gypsy had posted on Facebook, describing the death of Dee Dee. While both Gypsy and Dee Dee have been unreachable before due to medical visits, this time seemed suspicious. Kim's husband, David, climbed through the window to investigate the Blanchard house while the police awaited a search warrant, which came through at 10:45 PM on June 14, 2015. Police found Dee Dee dead in the bedroom with no sign of Gypsy.

== Reception ==
=== Critical response ===
On Rotten Tomatoes, the film has an approval rating of 100% based on 14 reviews. Neil Genzlinger from The New York Times, a top critic, said "[t]he strangeness of this killing speaks for itself, and the director, Erin Lee Carr, largely just lets it do so." Another top critic from The Hollywood Reporter, Sheri Linden, mentions "[d]igging beneath the headlines of the high profile matricide, which turned out to involve one of the most horrific examples of Munchausen syndrome by proxy ever documented, Carr's film poses as many provocative questions as it answers."

Aja Romano, from Vox, rated the film a 3.5/5 with a critical response noting "[t]he film's interweaving of past and present creates a visually unsettling tapestry of disbelief." Another critical response said by Brian Lowry, from CNN, says the film is "[a] twisted and twisty documentary that's as unsettling as it is absorbing."

=== Awards and nominations ===
In 2017, Mommy Dead and Dearest was nominated for two awards at that SXSW Film Festival (one for the Grand Jury Award and the other Chicken and Egg Award, but lost to The Work and I Am Another You).
