= The Act (TV series) =

2019 American limited series

- Genre: Biographical; Crime drama
- Created by: Nick Antosca; Michelle Dean
- Starring: Patricia Arquette; Joey King; AnnaSophia Robb; Chloë Sevigny; Calum Worthy
- Composer: Jeff Russo
- Country of origin: United States
- Original language: English
- No. of seasons: 1
- No. of episodes: 8

Production
- Executive producers: Nick Antosca; Michelle Dean; Britton Rizzio; Gregory Shephard
- Producer: Jan Peter Meyboom
- Running time: 48–60 minutes
- Production companies: Eat the Cat; Writ Large; Universal Content Productions

Original release
- Network: Hulu
- Release: March 20 – May 1, 2019

The Act is an American biographical crime drama television limited series that premiered in eight parts on March 20, 2019, on Hulu. The plot is based on the life of Gypsy Rose Blanchard and the murder of her mother, Dee Dee Blanchard, who was accused of abusing her daughter by fabricating illness and disabilities. Joey King portrayed Gypsy, while Patricia Arquette played her mother, Dee Dee Blanchard. AnnaSophia Robb, Chloë Sevigny, and Calum Worthy star in supporting roles.

At the 71st Primetime Emmy Awards, Arquette won for Outstanding Supporting Actress in a Limited Series and King received a nomination for Outstanding Lead Actress in a Limited Series.

== Premise ==
The series follows the story of Gypsy Blanchard (Joey King), who uses a wheelchair due to an illness. Growing up, her relationship with her overprotective mother (Patricia Arquette) begins to sour as she increasingly insists on her independence. She rebels as her mother, who dedicated her life to her care, grows more protective, controlling and abusive, particularly amid her attempt to explore her sexuality.

The relationship turns even more toxic as Gypsy discovers many secrets. She grew up believing she was sick with cancer but discovers that she was not sick at all. Her mother Dee Dee successfully deceived not only Gypsy but also her family, friends, and medical professionals into believing her child was ill. It is suggested that she suffers from factitious disorder imposed on another, a behavioral condition in which a caregiver exaggerates or fakes another person's illness. At the time, this condition was classified as Munchausen syndrome by proxy, by which it is still commonly known. The narrative eventually leads to murder after Gypsy asks her boyfriend to kill her mother.

== Cast and characters ==
=== Main ===
- Patricia Arquette as Clauddine "Dee Dee" Blanchard, Gypsy's mother and Emma's daughter
- Joey King as Gypsy-Rose Blanchard, Dee Dee's daughter and Emma's granddaughter. King shaved her head for the role.
- AnnaSophia Robb as Lacey Hutches, Blanchard's neighbor who is an original character in the show based on Aleah Woodmansee.
- Chloë Sevigny as Melanie "Mel" Hutches, Lacey's mother who is an original character in the show based on Amy Pinegar.
- Calum Worthy as Nick Godejohn, Gypsy's boyfriend who murders Dee Dee under Gypsy's order so they can be together.

=== Recurring ===
- Denitra Isler as Shelly, a neighbor who is close to the Blanchards, Mel, and Lacey.
- Steve Coulter as Dr. Evan Harley
- José Alfredo Fernandez as Officer Cox
- Poorna Jagannathan as Dr. Lakshmi Chandra

=== Guest ===
- Dean Norris as Russ, a man who was attracted to Dee Dee in 2011.
- Joe Tippett as Scott, Gypsy's older love interest whom she met at a comic book convention in 2011.
- Brooke Smith as Myra, Dee Dee's attorney
- Margo Martindale as Emma Pitre, Dee Dee's mother and Gypsy's grandmother
- Rhea Seehorn as Janet, Dee Dee's cousin
- Juliette Lewis as Kathy Godejohn, Nick's mother
- John Ales as Vance Godejohn, Nick's father
- Adam Arkin as a Springfield, Missouri detective who tracks down Gypsy and Nick in Wisconsin and interviews Gypsy after her arrest.
- Joe Knezevich as Prosecutor Rippy, Nick's lawyer based on Dan Patterson.
- Molly Ephraim as Kate, Gypsy's lawyer based on Mike Stanfield.
- Cliff Chamberlain as Rod Blanchard, Dee Dee's ex-husband and Gypsy's father. He left Dee Dee before Gypsy was born after he didn't know how to love her, as Rod was 17 while Dee Dee was 24.

== Episodes ==
No.	Title	Directed by	Written by	Original release date
1	"La Maison du Bon Reve"	Laure de Clermont-Tonnerre	Nick Antosca & Michelle Dean	March 20, 2019
Dee Dee Blanchard and her daughter Gypsy arrive in a new neighborhood in Springfield, Missouri, 2008, following the destruction of their previous home caused by Hurricane Katrina in 2005. Gypsy feels lonely due to a barrage of medical issues, but is befriended by Lacey, a teenager on their block. Lacey's mother, Mel, acts coldly towards Dee Dee after spotting Dee Dee and Gypsy stealing a necklace from a mall. Dee Dee later hosts a party at her house for all the neighbors, with the intention of buying Mel's silence. At the party, Dee Dee sees Gypsy eating frosting from a cupcake and immediately rushes her to the hospital, claiming Gypsy is allergic to sugar. Mel feels sympathy for Dee Dee's hardships, and the two women make peace. Gypsy hears the doctor telling her mother she is not allergic to sugar. That night, she walks to the kitchen, despite being equipped to a wheelchair, and eats whipped cream. Gypsy does not experience any of the anaphylaxis symptoms that her mother had warned her about, revealing that Dee Dee had lied to her. The episode flashes forward to June 14, 2015, revealing that Dee Dee has been found dead, Gypsy is gone, and the police are investigating.
2	"Teeth"	Laure de Clermont-Tonnerre	Dan Dietz	March 20, 2019
In 2009, Gypsy starts sneaking sugary foods at night, bringing about a visit to the dentist where all her teeth are removed, due to them rotting from the medications that Dee Dee gave her. Despite this, Dee Dee insists that she and Gypsy attend a Child of the Year awards ceremony. Dr. Lakshmi Chandra, a new doctor who is seeing Gypsy, suspects Gypsy's medical records are incorrect and begins contacting other hospitals to see if they are true. Dr. Chandra reports Gypsy's situation to Child Protective Services. When a social worker makes a visit, a panicked Dee Dee gives Gypsy sleeping pills, making her appear disoriented and dizzy when she speaks to the social worker. Dee Dee confronts Mel, believing she made the CPS report; Mel explains it wasn't her and reassures Dee Dee that she is a good mother. In the present day, Lacey tells her mother and the police that Gypsy had a secret Facebook account, which she used to get romantically involved with young men, possibly hinting that Gypsy had a boyfriend involved in Dee Dee's murder and her own disappearance.
3	"Two Wolverines"	Adam Arkin	Robin Veith	March 27, 2019
In 2011, Dee Dee makes Gypsy play dress-up for a costume convention, where they each attract men wearing Wolverine costumes who could complicate their insular relationship. Gypsy is attracted to a guy named Scott, while a man named Russ has an attraction for Dee Dee. Gypsy steals money and buys a phone so she can text Scott, and creates a secret Facebook account after discovering her mother has lied about her age, claiming she is fifteen (born in 1995), though her legal birth certificate states she was born in 1991. Meanwhile, Russ and Dee Dee briefly flirt, but Dee Dee cuts off contact with Russ when he expresses interest in pursuing a serious relationship. When Scott gets in a bar fight and winds up in the hospital, Gypsy decides to visit him; she leaves a note for Dee Dee, saying she left to be married to her prince charming, and signs it "your nineteen year old daughter". Scott invites Gypsy back to his house; moments later, Dee Dee arrives and threatens to create a scene if she doesn't go with her. She also tells Scott that Gypsy is 14. When they arrive home, Dee Dee forces Gypsy to come out of the van in a wheelchair.
4	"Stay Inside"	Christina Choe	Michelle Dean	April 3, 2019
In 2013, Gypsy starts experiencing her sexual awakening, becoming interested in dating after hearing about Lacey's new online boyfriend. Dee Dee wants to get legal guardianship of Gypsy, but discovers she can only do so if Gypsy is incapacitated and agrees to it. Dee Dee is diagnosed with diabetes, and while she's feeling sick, Gypsy buys a laptop without her knowledge. She creates an account on a Christian dating website where she meets Nick Godejohn, who claims to have a split personality with a dark side. Dee Dee makes Gypsy sign the guardianship documents, promising Gypsy she can protect her in case their fraud is discovered. As time goes by, Gypsy bonds with Nick, who introduces her to BDSM. One morning, Gypsy falls asleep with the laptop; Dee Dee sees it and smashes it with a hammer. When Gypsy states she'll just get a new one, Dee Dee tries to tie her hands, but Gypsy frees herself by spitting on her. Even though she has a chance to leave, Gypsy comes back to her mother and takes care of her. Later that night, Gypsy texts Nick about her destroyed computer; Nick assures her he will protect her. Gypsy then asks "from anyone?", and the episode ends with her masturbating on the floor.
5	"Plan B"	Steven Piet	Nick Antosca & Lisa Long	April 10, 2019
In 2015, Gypsy and Nick scheme to meet in person and hope to win Dee Dee's approval. The next day, Dee Dee and Gypsy go to the movies to watch Cinderella, but Dee Dee feels creeped out by Nick, who follows them inside the movie theater. Gypsy and Nick have sex for the first time in the bathroom. When Gypsy and Dee Dee arrive home, Nick calls and tells Dee Dee that he loves Gypsy, and that they have been in love for several years. Dee Dee ties Gypsy's hands to the bed. With their plan gone disastrously wrong, Gypsy tells Nick that she needs Victor, Nick's dark side, to kill her mother because she can't do it alone; he agrees and travels back to her. Gypsy buys a fishing knife and starts packing when she receives a message from Nick saying he's there.
6	"A Whole New World"	Laure de Clermont-Tonnerre	Heather Marion	April 17, 2019
While Gypsy and Nick are on the run following Dee Dee's murder, flashbacks to a much younger Dee Dee reveal how trauma with her own mother, Emma, set her up for conflict with Gypsy; the two have different ideas over how to raise her. When Gypsy is two years old, Emma takes care of Gypsy while Dee Dee is in jail for check fraud. When Dee Dee comes back, she gives Gypsy cough medicine, insisting she has a fever even though she does not. When Gypsy is six, Emma's health is getting worse, but Dee Dee neglects her until she finally dies. After Emma dies, Dee Dee discovers that Emma never gave the letters she wrote to Gypsy while being in prison. Gypsy has an accident falling from a trampoline; when they come back from the hospital, Dee Dee places her in a wheelchair. In the present day, Gypsy's plans to run away with Nick are put on hold because Nick only bought one return ticket to his hometown. After waiting for two days, Gypsy and Nick officially leave for Wisconsin.
7	"Bonnie & Clyde"	Hannah Fidell	Dan Dietz & Robin Veith	April 24, 2019
Gypsy is excited to start over with Nick in Wisconsin, but their new life doesn't match the happily-ever-after she imagined; her anxiety worsens as past transgressions begin to catch up with them. When Gypsy arrives at the Godejohns' house, she sees that Nick's parents don't take care of him as much as Dee Dee cared for her. Gypsy also starts to feel remorse over her mother's death. Since Dee Dee's body has not yet been found, she and Nick post vulgar comments on Facebook about the murder; Lacey sees the posts and immediately contacts Mel. However, Nick and Gypsy forget to disable the location, resulting in local police raiding the Godejohns' house later that night. Gypsy and Nick are interrogated separately: Nick accepts his blame and states he did it because he loves Gypsy, while Gypsy maintains she had no idea Nick was going to kill Dee Dee. Gypsy's trial begins; Lacey and Mel are shocked to see Gypsy walking on TV. Gypsy bursts into tears upon learning that she could be sentenced to life in prison or the death penalty if she pleads guilty for Dee Dee's murder.
8	"Free"	Steven Piet	Nick Antosca, Michelle Dean & Lisa Long	May 1, 2019
Gypsy fights for her life by defending her actions; Gypsy's lawyer instructs her to provide all available medical records since birth. Gypsy calls Lacey, asking her to visit, though Lacey is non-committal; Gypsy also calls her father, Rod, for her medical records. When Rod arrives, Gypsy confronts him over his absence, believing that he never loved her or wanted to be in her life. However, Rod shows her happy pictures of them together when she was a small child. Gypsy's lawyer asks the judge to try Gypsy separately from Nick, as both had different motives in the murder. The motion is granted, which upsets Nick, as he claims he only did it to be with her. Mel visits Gypsy at the prison instead of Lacey; she informs Gypsy that she and Lacey have decided not to continue their association with her. Flashbacks depict the night of Dee Dee's murder; Gypsy's last conversation with her mother is shown. Later, when Dee Dee is asleep, Gypsy lets Nick inside; Nick stabs Dee Dee while Gypsy hides in the bathroom, and the two have sex before leaving the house. The final scene depicts Gypsy in her cell, imagining herself tilting her head on Dee Dee's shoulder; Gypsy believes that she still loves her mother despite what she went through. Subtitles reveal that Gypsy is currently serving a 10-year sentence and plans to start a family when she gets out, while Nick is currently serving a life sentence without parole.

== Production ==
=== Development ===
On July 21, 2017, Hulu confirmed it had put the production into development. The potential series was expected to be written by Michelle Dean and Nick Antosca based on Dean's BuzzFeed article "Dee Dee Wanted Her Daughter To Be Sick, Gypsy Wanted Her Mom To Be Murdered". Writ Large, who acquired the screen rights to the article in 2016, was set to produce. Production companies involved with the series included Universal Cable Productions.

On May 18, 2018, it was reported that Hulu had given the production a series order. It was further announced that Dean and Antosca would serve as co-showrunners and executive produce alongside Greg Shephard and Britton Rizzio. On August 1, 2018, it was announced that Laure de Clermont-Tonnerre would direct the series' first episode. On December 20, 2018, it was announced that the series would premiere on March 20, 2019. On March 11, 2019, Jeff Russo was announced to be the show's composer.

=== Casting ===
In September 2018, it was announced that Patricia Arquette, Joey King, Chloë Sevigny, and AnnaSophia Robb had been cast in starring roles. On October 2, 2018, it was reported that Calum Worthy had joined the cast in a starring role.

In April 2019, Kristy Blanchard, stepmother of Gypsy Blanchard, stated that she was unhappy with how Aleah Woodmansee was portrayed in the show. While Woodmansee's name isn't mentioned, Robb's character Lacey originates from her. Blanchard stated that there was a scene in the second episode where Lacey gave Gypsy a cigarette, which in reality, did not happen. In an interview with Vulture, Blanchard stated: "She is the total opposite of that. It hurts Aleah because she lives in Springfield, and people are going to look at her differently and she's scared that it affects her job and reputation." Woodmansee also took issue with the choice to have Robb speak in a twangy accent, adding, "I'm not a fan of the whole hillbilly tone."

=== Filming ===
Principal photography for the series took place from October 2018 to February 2019 in Effingham County, Georgia.

Multiple scenes were filmed at the Savannah Mall and in Episode 8 scenes were filmed at the Bryan County Courthouse.

=== Controversy ===
On April 4, 2019, Gypsy Blanchard stated that she would be taking legal action towards The Act and Dean, its creator. While Blanchard was not able to watch the show in prison, she stated: "I feel it is very unfair and unprofessional that producers and co-producer Michelle Dean has used my actual name and story without my consent, and the life rights to do so." Screenwriter Franchesca Macelli told Vulture regarding Gypsy's statement "it was from her own place of anger and disappointment and frustration" and that "nobody is taking legal action". Macelli stated that they will be looking into the legal rights for their actions, either cancelling the show or making its storyline right.

Kristy Blanchard, Gypsy's stepmother, accused Dean of breaking a promise to share the financial proceeds from the show with Gypsy, saying: "We were on a phone conversation, and she had told me that whatever she made, it didn't matter what it was, she was gonna send us 50 percent of what she made and she was gonna keep 50 percent."

== Reception ==
=== Critical response ===
The series received highly positive reviews from critics. On review aggregator Rotten Tomatoes, the series has an approval rating of 88% based on 49 reviews, with an average rating of 7.4/10. The website's critical consensus reads, "Disturbingly nuanced performances from Patricia Arquette and Joey King make The Act a convincing case for the ongoing dramatization of true crime stories." On Metacritic, it has a weighted average score of 73 out of 100 based on 17 critics, indicating "generally favorable reviews".

=== Awards and nominations ===
Year	Award	Category	Nominee(s)	Result	Ref.
2019	Hollywood Critics Association Midseason Awards	Best Streaming Movie or TV Series		Nominated	
2019	International Online Cinema Awards	Best Actress in a Limited Series or TV Movie	Joey King	Nominated	
2019	Online Film & Television Association Awards	Best Limited Series		Nominated	
2019	Online Film & Television Association Awards	Best Supporting Actress in a Motion Picture or Limited Series	Patricia Arquette	Nominated	
2019	Primetime Emmy Awards	Outstanding Lead Actress in a Limited Series or Movie	Joey King	Nominated	
2019	Primetime Emmy Awards	Outstanding Supporting Actress in a Limited Series or a Movie	Patricia Arquette	Won	
2019	Satellite Awards	Best Miniseries & Limited Series		Nominated	
2019	Satellite Awards	Best Actress in a Miniseries or a Motion Picture Made for Television	Joey King	Nominated	
2019	Satellite Awards	Best Supporting Actress in a Series, Miniseries or a Motion Picture Made for Television	Patricia Arquette	Nominated	
2019	World Soundtrack Awards	Television Composer of the Year	Jeff Russo	Nominated	
2020	Artios Awards	Outstanding Achievement in Casting – Limited Series	Sharon Bialy, Sherry Thomas, Lisa Mae Fincannon, Craig Fincannon, and Kimberly Wistedt	Nominated	
2020	Critics' Choice Television Awards	Best Actress in a Movie Made for Television or Limited Series	Joey King	Nominated	
2020	Critics' Choice Television Awards	Best Supporting Actress in a Movie Made for Television or Limited Series	Patricia Arquette	Nominated	
2020	Golden Globe Awards	Best Actress – Limited Series or Television Film	Joey King	Nominated	
2020	Golden Globe Awards	Best Supporting Actress – Series, Limited Series or Television Film	Patricia Arquette	Won	
2020	Prémios Fantastic Awards	Best International Series or Mini-Series in Streaming		Nominated	
2020	The ReFrame Stamp	Top 100 Most Popular Television (2018–2019)		Won	
2020	Screen Actors Guild Awards	Outstanding Performance by a Female Actor in a Miniseries or Television Movie	Joey King	Nominated	
2020	Screen Actors Guild Awards	Outstanding Performance by a Female Actor in a Miniseries or Television Movie	Patricia Arquette	Nominated	
