= Michelle Dean =

Canadian journalist and critic

- Born: Canada
- Education: McGill University; University of Toronto
- Occupations: Critic; journalist * author
- Writing career
- Period: 2011-present
- Genre: Non-fiction
- Subjects: Biography, criticism
- Website: michelledean.tumblr.com

Michelle Dean (born 1979) is a Canadian author and freelance journalist and critic.

== Early life and education ==
Dean received a bachelor of arts degree in history from McGill University in 2002 and a law degree in 2005. She worked at White & Case from 2005 to 2010. She received a master's degree in Law from the University of Toronto in 2011.

== Career ==
Her work has appeared in The New Yorker, The New Republic, The New York Times Magazine, Elle and Literary Review Canada. Her first book, Sharp: The Women Who Made an Art of Having an Opinion, was published by Grove Atlantic in 2018.

She is also the co-creator and executive producer of the Hulu series The Act. The show was based on Dean's reporting.

== Awards ==
Dean was honored in 2016 with the National Book Critics Circle's Nona Balakian Citation for Excellence in Reviewing.

== Personal life ==
She currently lives and works in Los Angeles.
