= Murder in Missouri law =

Aspect of Missouri criminal law

Murder in Missouri law constitutes the killing, under circumstances defined by law, of people within or under the jurisdiction of the U.S. state of Missouri.

The United States Centers for Disease Control and Prevention reported that in the year 2021, the state had a murder rate somewhat above the median for the entire country.

== Definitions ==
=== First-degree murder ===
Missouri law specifies five levels of homicide in total, with first-degree murder being the most serious form of homicide. First-degree murder constitutes the intentional killing of a person with premeditation. For adult offenders, it is punished by either the death penalty or life imprisonment without the possibility of parole unless the sentence is commuted by a governor. It is illegal in Missouri statute to give the death penalty for someone with an intellectual disability, in addition to it being illegal nationwide since 2002. For juvenile offenders, it is punished by life-with-parole or a prison term between 30 and 40 years.

The death penalty is possible for adults convicted of first-degree murder when the jury unanimously finds that any potential aggravating factors listed in Missouri law outweigh any potential mitigating circumstances listed in Missouri law.

=== Second-degree murder ===
Second-degree murder constitutes the intentional killing of a person without premeditation, the unintentional killing of a person with intent to cause bodily injury, or the killing of a person caused by the perpetration or attempted perpetration of any felony other than murder or manslaughter. It is punished by 10 to 30 years in prison, or life-with-parole.

== Penalties ==
The sentences for homicide offenses in Missouri are listed below.

Offense	Mandatory sentence
Second-degree involuntary manslaughter	Up to 4 years in prison; up to 7 years in prison if the victim was targeted as a police officer
First-degree involuntary manslaughter	3 to 10 years in prison; 5 to 15 years in prison if the victim was targeted as a police officer
Voluntary manslaughter	5 to 15 years in prison
Second-degree murder	10 to 30 years in prison, or life with parole
First-degree murder	For adults: Death (aggravating circumstances) or life imprisonment without parole For juveniles: Life imprisonment without parole (aggravating circumstances); Life with parole or; 30 to 40 years in prison

In the 2013 case of State v. Nathan, the state supreme court remanded a mandatory sentence for a juvenile charged with first degree murder.
