= Murder by Medic =

British true crime documentary television series

- Genre: True crime documentary
- Country of origin: United Kingdom
- Original language: English

Production
- Running time: 43–44 minutes
- Production company: FirstLookTV

Original release
- Network: Crime+Investigation
- Release: 2024 – present

Murder by Medic is a British true crime documentary television series about murders committed by medical professionals. The programme presents cases in which doctors, nurses, paramedics and other healthcare workers use their medical knowledge to kill rather than treat their victims. It is produced by British factual television company FirstLookTV for the Crime+Investigation channel.

== Format ==
Each episode focuses on a single case and uses interviews, archive material and simple reconstructions to explain how suspicions arose, how investigations were carried out and how the offenders were brought to trial. Contributors typically include detectives, prosecutors and medical or forensic specialists commenting on the evidence and the clinical context of the crimes.

== Broadcast ==
Murder by Medic was first broadcast on Crime+Investigation in the United Kingdom and Ireland in 2024. Abacus Media Rights acts as the international distributor and has sold the series to broadcasters and streaming services in the United States, Canada and parts of Europe, including Hulu in the US and Blue Ant Media in Canada.

== Episodes ==
=== Series 1 ===
- S01E01 Paul Novak
- S01E02 Malcolm Webster
- S01E03 Chaz Higgs
- S01E04 Kimberly Saenz
- S01E05 William George Davis
- S01E06 Marie Whiston
- S01E07 Beverley Allitt
- S01E08 Lisa Tseng
- S01E09 Mitesh Patel
- S01E10 Harold Shipman
- S01E11 Reta Mays
- S01E12 Robert Neulander
- S01E13 Vickie Dawn Jackson

=== Series 2 ===
- S02E01 Larry Rudolph
- S02E02 Clara Harris
- S02E03 Robert Ferrante
- S02E04 Jessy Kurczewski
- S02E05 Genene Jones
- S02E06 Christopher Duntsch
- S02E07 Barbara Pasa
- S02E08 Elizabeth Wettlaufer
- S02E09 Victorino Chua
- S02E10 Jeanine Hannah
- S02E11 Anne Grigg Booth
- S02E12 Donald Harvey
- S02E13 Charles Cullen

=== Series 3 ===
- S03E01 Yolanda Saldívar
- S03E02 Colin Howell
- S03E03 Robert Bierenbaum
- S03E04 Michael Swango
- S03E05 Roger Dean
- S03E06 Orville Lynn Majors
- S03E07 Anthony Garcia
- S03E08 Martin MacNeill
- S03E09 Garry Davis
- S03E10 Kristin Rossum
- S03E11 Kristen Gilbert
- S03E12 Efren Saldivar
- S03E13 Jennifer Hall
- S03E14 Megan Haines

=== Series 4 ===
- S04E01 John Ronald Brown
- S04E02 Jack Kevorkian
- S04E03 Adam Frasch
- S04E04 James Ryan
- S04E05 Richard Sharpe
- S04E06 Niels Högel
- S04E07 Jacob Hoysted
- S04E08 Alison Firth
- S04E09 Billy Chemirmir
- S04E10 Regan Nichols
