= Aistrup =

Aistrup is a Danish surname. Notable people with this name include:

- Nikola Aistrup (born 1987), Danish professional racing cyclist
- Sydney Aistrup (1909–1986), English footballer
- Christina Aistrup Hansen (born 1984), convicted Danish nurse
