= Michael Swango =

American serial killer

- Born: James Michael Swango; October 21, 1954 (age 71); Tacoma, Washington, U.S.
- Other names: David J. Adams, Jack Kirk, Michael Kirk, Michael Swan
- Status: Incarcerated
- Convictions: New York; First degree murder (3 counts); Ohio; Aggravated murder
- Penalty: New York; 3 consecutive life sentences without possibility of parole Ohio; 20 years to life

Details
- Victims: 4–60
- Span of crimes: 1981–1997
- Country: United States, Zimbabwe
- States: Illinois, New York, Ohio, South Dakota
- Date apprehended: June 1997
- Imprisoned at: ADX Florence

Michael Joseph Swango (born James Michael Swango, October 21, 1954) is an American serial killer and licensed physician who is estimated to have been involved in as many as 60 fatal poisonings of patients and colleagues in the United States and Zimbabwe; he admitted to causing four deaths. He was sentenced in 2000 to three consecutive life terms without the possibility of parole and is serving his sentence at ADX Florence at his own request.

== Early life ==
Michael Swango was born in Tacoma, Washington, and raised in Quincy, Illinois, the middle child of Muriel and John Virgil Swango. Swango's father was a career United States Army officer who served in the Vietnam War, was listed in Who's Who in Government 1972–1973, and became an alcoholic. Upon his return from Vietnam, John Swango became depressed and he and his wife Muriel divorced. Growing up, Swango saw little of his father, and as a result, was closer to his mother. He was valedictorian of his 1972 Quincy Catholic Boys High School class. During high school, he played clarinet in the band.

Swango served in the Marine Corps, graduating from recruit training at Marine Corps Recruit Depot, San Diego. He received an honorable discharge in 1980. He saw no action overseas during his service, but his training in the Marines left him with a commitment to physical exercise. When not studying, he was frequently seen jogging or performing calisthenics on the Quincy University campus and he was known to perform pushups as a form of self-punishment when criticized by instructors. Swango graduated from Quincy summa cum laude and was given the American Chemical Society Award. Following his graduation, Swango went to medical school at Southern Illinois University School of Medicine (SIU).

Swango displayed troubling behavior during his time at SIU. Although he was a brilliant student, he preferred to work as an ambulance attendant rather than concentrate on his studies. A fascination with dying patients was observed during this time. Barely noticed at the time, many of Swango's assigned patients ended up "coding", or suffering life-threatening emergencies, with at least five of them dying.

Swango's lackadaisical approach to his studies caught up with him a month before he was due to graduate, when it was discovered that he had faked checkups during his OB/GYN rotation. Some of his fellow students had suspected he had been faking checkups as early as his second year, but this was the first time he had been caught. He was nearly expelled, but was allowed to remain when one member of the committee voted to give him a second chance. At the time, a unanimous vote was required for a student to be dismissed. Even earlier, several students and faculty members had raised concerns about Swango's competence to practice medicine. Eventually, the school allowed him to graduate one year after his entering classmates, on condition that he repeat the OB/GYN rotation and complete several assignments in other specialties.

== Murders ==
Rhodes Hall at The Ohio State University Wexner Medical Center

Despite a very poor evaluation in his dean's letter from SIU, Swango gained a surgical internship at Ohio State University Medical Center in 1983, to be followed by a residency in neurosurgery. While he worked in Rhodes Hall at OSU, nurses noticed that apparently healthy patients began dying mysteriously with alarming frequency. Each time, Swango had been the floor intern. One nurse caught him injecting some "medicine" into a patient who later became strangely ill.

The nurses reported their concerns to administrators but were met with accusations of paranoia. Swango was cleared by a cursory investigation in 1984. However, his work had been so slovenly that OSU pulled its residency offer after his internship ended in June. Later, it emerged that OSU officials feared that Swango would sue if he was fired without cause, and resolved to quietly push him out of the hospital as soon as possible after his internship ended.

In July 1984, Swango returned to Quincy and began working as an emergency medical technician with the Adams County Ambulance Corps, even though he had been fired from an ambulance service in Springfield for making a heart patient drive to the hospital. Colleagues reported on his bizarre behavior and morbid obsessions, with one colleague reporting that Swango "sometimes [feels he has] an evil purpose in life." Soon, many of the paramedics on staff began noticing that whenever Swango prepared the coffee or brought any food in, several of them usually became violently ill, with no apparent cause. In October of that year, Swango was arrested by the Quincy Police Department after arsenic and other poisons were found in his possession. The main poison he used on his colleagues was an ant poison that contained arsenic.

On January 20, 1985, Swango accepted a job at the Fisher-Titus Medical Center in Norwalk, Ohio. He had worked only 52 hours over a five-day period before hospital officials learned of his past and pulled his privileges. During the five-day period, he examined 52 patients and did not present any problems. Fisher-Titus officials said they did not know of Swango's past when they hired him.

On August 23, 1985, Swango was convicted of aggravated battery for poisoning co-workers. He was sentenced to five years' imprisonment. Swango's conviction led to recriminations at OSU. A scathing review by law school dean James E. Meeks concluded that the hospital should have called in the police, and also revealed several glaring shortcomings in its initial investigation of Swango. Nonetheless, it was another decade before OSU conceded it should have called in outside investigators. Prosecutors in Franklin County, Ohio (where Columbus is located) also considered bringing charges of murder and attempted murder against Swango, but they decided against it for lack of physical evidence.

In 1989, Swango was released from prison. He worked as a counselor at the state career development center in Newport News, Virginia. However, he was forced out after being caught working on a scrapbook of disasters on work time. Swango then worked as a laboratory technician in Newport News for ATICoal (which later became Vanguard Energy, a division of CITA Logistics). During his time there, several employees sought medical attention with complaints of persistent and increasing stomach pains. Around this time, Swango met Kristin Lynn Kinney, a nurse at Riverside Hospital. The couple fell in love and planned to marry. He was employed until 1991, when he resigned his position to seek out a new position as a doctor.

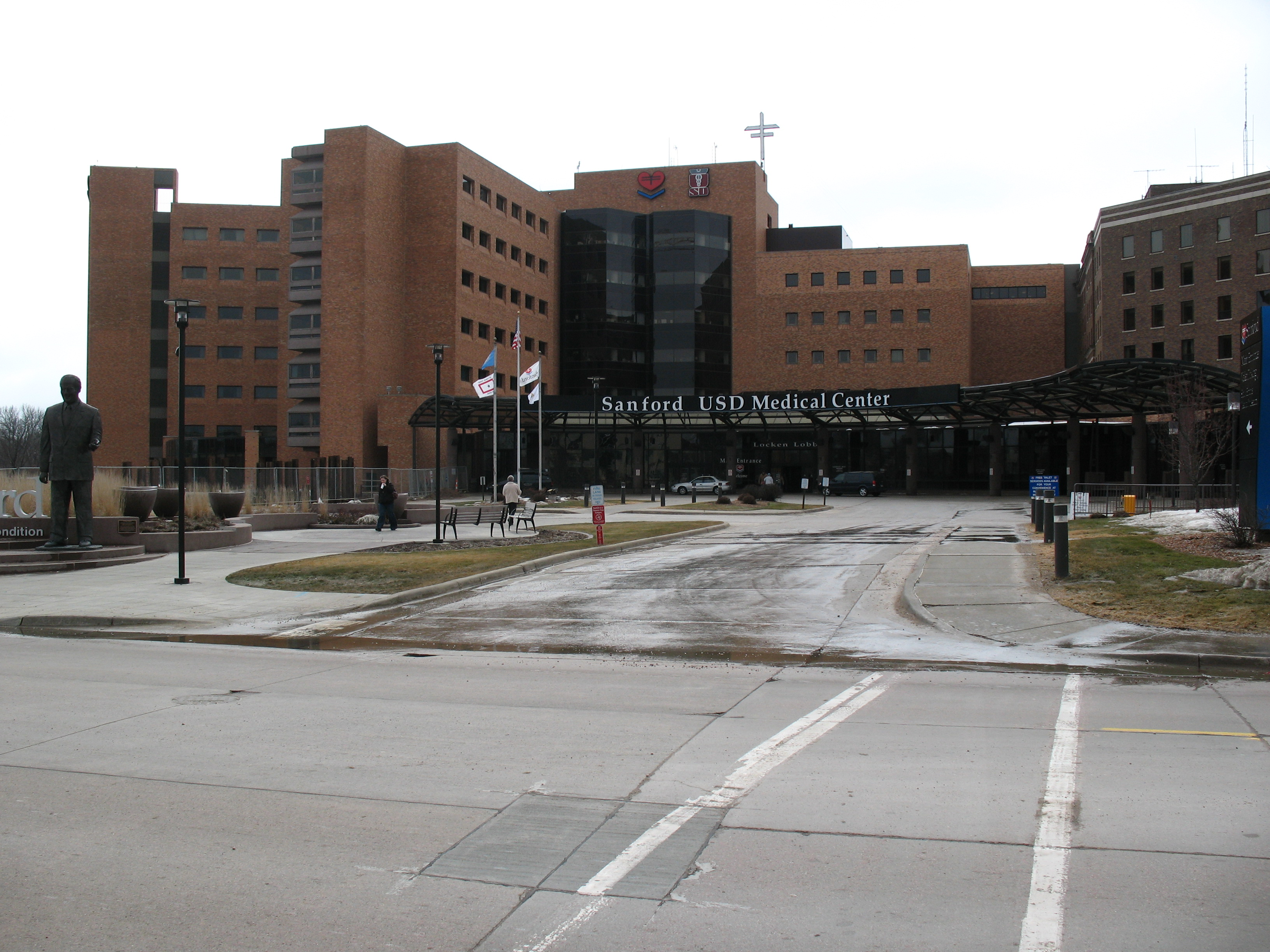
Sanford USD Medical Center

In 1991, Swango legally changed his name to Daniel J. Adams and tried to apply for a residency program at Ohio Valley Medical Center in Wheeling, West Virginia. In July 1992, he began working at Sanford USD Medical Center in Sioux Falls, South Dakota. In both cases, Swango forged several legal documents that he used to reestablish himself as a physician and respected member of society. He forged a fact sheet from the Illinois Department of Corrections that falsified his criminal record, stating that he had been convicted of a misdemeanor for getting into a fistfight with a co-worker and received six months in prison, rather than the five years for felony poisoning that he served.

Most states will not grant a medical license to a violent felon, considering such a conviction to be evidence of unprofessional conduct. He forged a Restoration of Civil Rights letter from Virginia Governor Gerald L. Baliles, falsely stating that Baliles had decided to restore Swango's right to vote and serve on a jury, based on "reports from friends and colleagues" that he had committed no further crimes after his "misdemeanor" and was leading an "exemplary lifestyle".

Swango established a sterling reputation at Sanford. However, when he attempted to join the American Medical Association (AMA), it conducted a more thorough background check than Sanford and found out about the poisoning conviction. That Thanksgiving Day, the Discovery Channel aired an episode of Justice Files that included a segment on Swango. Amid the AMA report and calls from frightened colleagues, Sanford fired Swango. Kinney went back to Virginia soon afterward after suffering from violent migraines. After she left Swango, the headaches stopped.

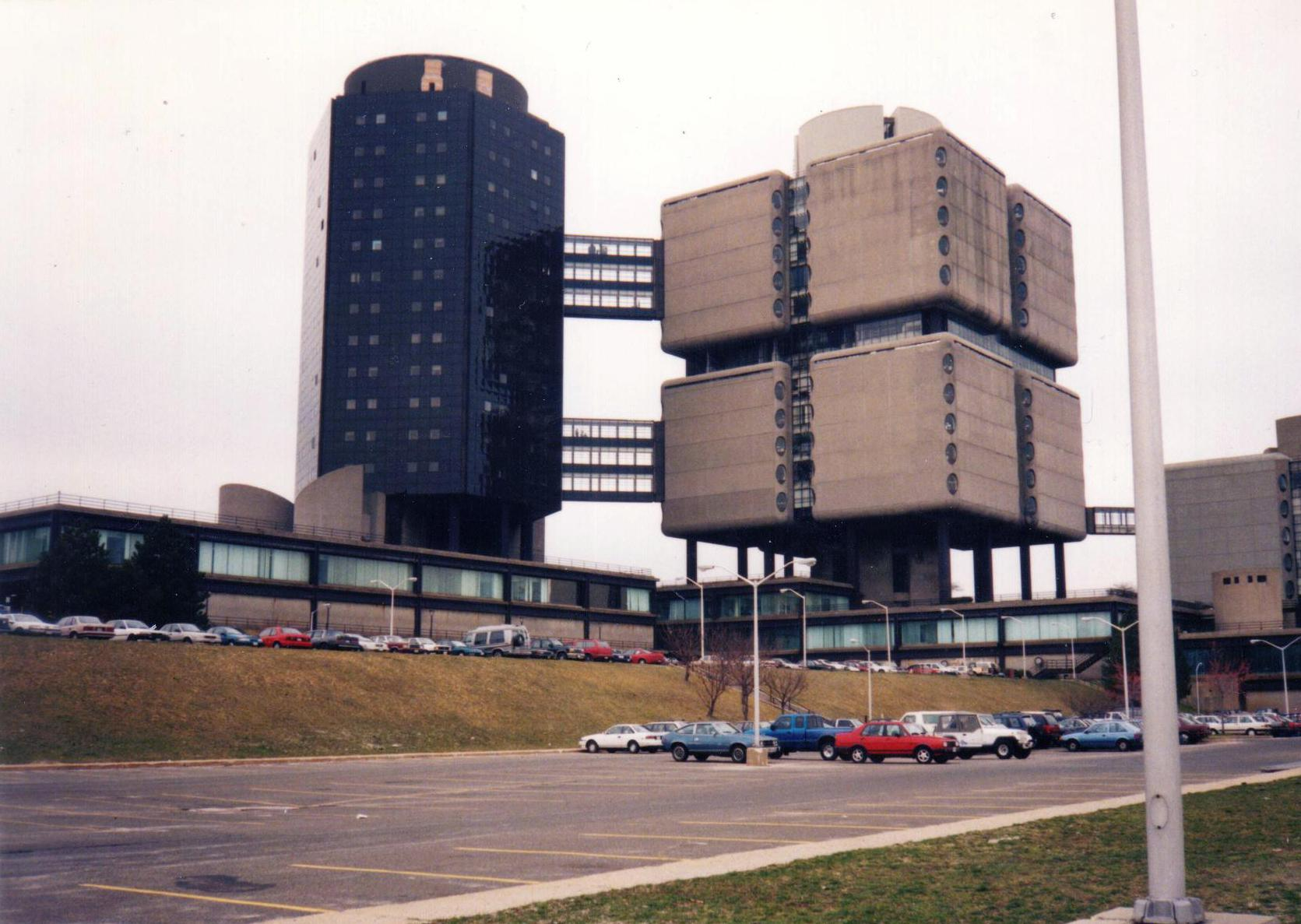
Stony Brook University in the 1990s

The AMA temporarily lost track of Swango, who managed to find a place in the psychiatric residency program at the Stony Brook University School of Medicine in New York. His first rotation was in the internal medicine department at the Veterans Affairs Medical Center in Northport, New York. Once again, his patients began dying for no explicable reason. Four months later, Kinney died by suicide and arsenic was found in her body at the time of her death.

Kinney's mother, Sharon Cooper, was horrified to find out that a person with Swango's history could be allowed to practice medicine. She contacted a friend of Kinney who was a nurse at Sanford, who in turn alerted Sanford's dean, Robert Talley, to Swango's whereabouts. Talley telephoned Jordan Cohen, the dean at Stony Brook. Under intense questioning from the head of Stony Brook's psychiatry department, Alan Miller, Swango admitted he had lied about his poisoning conviction in Illinois. He was immediately fired. The public outcry resulted in Cohen and Miller being forced to resign before the end of the year. Before he resigned, Cohen sent a warning about Swango to all 125 medical schools and all 1,000 teaching hospitals across the US, effectively blacklisting Swango from getting a medical residency at any American institution.

Since the latest Swango incident took place at a Veterans Affairs facility, federal authorities got involved. Swango dropped out of sight until mid-1994, when the Federal Bureau of Investigation (FBI) found out he was living in Atlanta and working as a chemist at a computer equipment company's wastewater facility. Soon after the FBI alerted the company, Swango was fired for lying on his job application. The FBI obtained a warrant charging Swango with using fraudulent credentials to gain entry to a Veterans Affairs hospital.

By that time, Swango had fled the country. In November 1994, he settled in Zimbabwe and used forged documents to obtain a job at Mnene Lutheran Mission Hospital in the center of the country. Again, his patients began dying mysteriously. As a result of suspicions of Dr. Christopher Zishiri, the medical director there, Swango was suspended. Because of the failure to perform adequate autopsies, no firm conclusions could be drawn.

During his suspension, Swango hired lawyer David Coltart to enable him to return to clinical practice. He also appealed to the authorities at Mpilo Hospital, Bulawayo, to allow him in the interim to continue working voluntarily there; however, this was opposed by Abdollah Mesbah, a surgical resident, who had often found him snooping around mysteriously in the wards and in the intensive care unit (ICU) even when not on call. He had suspected that sudden deaths of some patients were due to Swango, but had no proof at that stage.

At this time, Swango rented a room in Bulawayo from a widowed woman who subsequently became violently sick after a meal she had prepared for herself and a friend. The woman consulted a local surgeon, Michael Cotton, who suspected arsenic poisoning and persuaded her to send hair samples for forensic analysis to Pretoria, South Africa. These clippings confirmed toxic levels of arsenic in the hair. The lab reports were passed on by the Zimbabwe Republic Police Criminal Investigation Department (CID) through Interpol to the FBI, who subsequently visited Zimbabwe to interview Cotton and the pathologist in Bulawayo, Stanford Mathe.

In the meantime, Swango had sensed that authorities were closing in on him. He crossed the border to Zambia and subsequently to Namibia, where he found temporary medical work. He was charged in absentia with poisonings. In March 1997, he applied for a job at the Royal Hospital in Dhahran, Saudi Arabia, using a false résumé.

== Arrest and guilty plea ==
During Swango's time in Africa and the Middle East, Tom Valery, chief investigator for the Office of Inspector General of the Department of Veterans Affairs (VA), consulted with Charlene Thomesen, a forensic psychiatrist. Because of her considerable clinical expertise, Thomesen was able to review documents and evidence and give a criminal profile of Swango, along with her assessment of why he had committed such crimes. Valery was called by the FBI to discuss holding Swango. He called Richard Thomesen, who was stationed in the DEA's Manhattan field office to discuss the case. Thomesen's conversation focused on Swango lying on his government application to work at the VA, where he prescribed narcotic medications. There was enough evidence for Immigration and Naturalization Service agents to arrest Swango in June 1997, on a layover at Chicago O'Hare International Airport on his way to Saudi Arabia.

Faced with hard evidence of his fraudulent activities and the possibility of an extended inquiry into his time in Zimbabwe, Swango pleaded guilty to defrauding the government in March 1998. In July 1998, he was sentenced to three-and-a-half years in prison. The sentencing judge ordered that Swango not be allowed to prepare or deliver food, or have any involvement in preparing or distributing drugs.

Although the FBI, the VA, and prosecutors for the Eastern District of New York were convinced Swango was a serial killer, they knew it would be difficult to prove beyond a reasonable doubt. They also knew that they had a limited amount of time to amass that proof. Federal inmates must serve at least 85 percent of their sentences before being eligible for time off with good behavior, meaning that they likely had only three years to prove that Swango was indeed a murderer. They feared that if they could not find enough evidence to convict Swango, he would likely kill again. The government used this time to amass a dossier of Swango's crimes. As part of that investigation, prosecutors exhumed the bodies of three patients and found poisonous chemicals in them. They also found evidence that Swango paralyzed patient Baron Harris with an injection of what was supposedly a sedative. The sedative caused him to lapse into a coma, and Harris died on November 9, 1993.

Additionally, prosecutors found evidence that Swango lied about the death of Cynthia Ann McGee in 1984, a patient he treated during his internship at OSU. Swango claimed she suffered heart failure; he had killed her by giving her a potassium injection that stopped her heart. On July 11, 2000, less than a week before he was due to be released from prison on the fraud charge, federal prosecutors in the Eastern District filed a criminal complaint charging Swango with three counts of murder and one count each of assault, false statements, mail fraud, and conspiracy to commit wire fraud. At the same time, Zimbabwean authorities charged him with poisoning seven patients, five of whom died. A week before the complaint was handed up, FBI agents interviewed Swango in prison. They told him that on the day he was due to be released, he would be extradited to Zimbabwe to face charges of murder and attempted murder. Knowing that he would likely face the death penalty for his crimes in Zimbabwe, Swango began talks for a plea agreement. Eventually, prosecutors agreed to not pursue the death penalty or extradition in return for Swango accepting a sentence of life in prison without parole.

Swango was indicted on July 17, 2000, and pleaded not guilty. On September 6, he pleaded guilty to the three murder counts, as well as counts of wire fraud and mail fraud, before Judge Jacob Mishler. At his sentencing hearing, Swango admitted to causing three murders, lying about his role in causing a fourth death, and lying about his 1985 conviction. The murders to which he pleaded guilty were Thomas Sammarco, 73, George Siano, 62 and Aldo Serini, 62, all of whom were killed over the span of three months in 1993.

Prosecutors read lurid passages from Swango's notebook, describing the joy he felt during his crimes. Judge Mishler sentenced Swango to three consecutive terms of life without parole. He is incarcerated at ADX Florence. He was sent to ADX at his own request; he had been stabbed by another inmate while serving time for lying to the VA, and feared he would be attacked again if he were placed in general population. In his book Blind Eye, Quincy native James B. Stewart estimated that counting the suspicious deaths at SIU, circumstantial evidence links Swango to 35 suspicious deaths. The FBI believes he may be responsible for as many as 60 deaths, which would make him one of the most prolific serial killers in American history.

== Modus operandi ==
Swango rarely changed his murder methods. With non-patients, such as his coworkers at the emergency medical service, he used poisons, usually arsenic, slipping them into foods and beverages. With patients, he sometimes used poisons as well, but usually he administered an overdose of whichever drug the patient had been prescribed, or wrote unnecessary prescriptions for dangerous drugs.

== See also ==
- List of serial killers in the United States
- List of medical and pseudo-medical serial killers
- John Bodkin Adams – British doctor and suspected serial killer
- H. H. Holmes
- Christopher Duntsch
- Jayant Patel
- Harold Shipman – doctor and Britain's most prolific serial killer
- Beverley Allitt
- Lainz Angels of Death
- Malmö Östra hospital murders
- 2011 Stepping Hill Hospital poisoning incident
- Niels Högel – German nurse who murdered approximately 100 patients
- Christina Aistrup Hansen
- Donald Harvey – American serial killer of medical background that, like Swango, used cyanide (among other poisons) in his murders
