= Money (financial website) =

American personal finance magazine and website

- Former name: Money Magazine
- Website type: Personal finance
- Available in: English: money.com Spanish: money.com/es/
- Founded: 1972 (as Money Magazine)
- Successors: Money Group, LLC
- Headquarters: San Juan, Puerto Rico, {{{location_country}}}
- Area served: United States
- Owners: Money Group, LLC
- CEO: Greg Powel
- Industry: Financial services, Media
- Products: Financial calculators, Budgeting Tools, Investment comparison
- Services: Personal finance advice, News and analysis, Financial product reviews, Educational resources.
- Website: money.com
- Commercial: Yes
- Launched: 2014 (as Money.com)
- Current status: Active
- ISSN: 0149-4953

Money is an American brand and a personal finance website owned by Money Group. From its 1972 founding until 2018, it was a monthly magazine published by Time Inc. and subsequently by Meredith Corporation from 2018 to 2019. Its articles cover the gamut of personal finance topics ranging from credit cards, mortgages, insurance, banking, and investing to family finance issues, including paying for college, credit, career, and home improvement. It also publishes an annual list of "America's Best Places to Live".

== History ==
The first issue of Money magazine was published in October 1972 by Time Inc. The magazine, along with Fortune, partnered with sister cable network CNN in CNNMoney.com after the discontinuation of the CNNfn business news channel in 2005. In 2014, after Time Inc.'s spin-off from its parent company Time Warner, which also owned CNN, Money launched its website, Money.com.

After Meredith Corporation acquired Time Inc. at the beginning of 2018, Money was put up for sale. In April 2019, Meredith announced the discontinuation of Money's print publication, focusing instead on its digital platform, Money.com. The last print issue was published in June 2019.

In October 2019, Meredith Corporation sold the Money brand and website to Money Group, formerly known as Ad Practitioners LLC, a Puerto Rico-based media and advertising company which operates ConsumersAdvocate.org. In 2023, Money added Best Cars and Best Hospitals to their roster of flagships, joining their existing Best Places to Live, Best Places to Travel, Best Colleges, and Best Banks annual franchises.

== Products and services ==
Money's website includes financial news coverage, informational content on credit, loans, insurance, investing, and personal finance, and individual and comparative product and service reviews of companies across those industries. Money employs an editorial team of financial experts, reporters, journalists, and writers with offices in Puerto Rico and New York.

== Legacy and honors ==
In its 50+ year history, Money Magazine has won numerous awards and honors including:

- Emmy award nomination (2020) for mini-documentary “Rise Above,” featuring Amanda Nguyen
- Gerald Loeb Award Winners for Personal Finance (2016, 2017)
- Society for Advancing Business Editing and Writing (SABEW) Distinguished Achievement Award (1998)
- National Magazine Awards for Personal Service (1988)
- National Magazine Awards for Public Interests (1987)
- National Magazine Awards for General Excellence (1986)

Money’s art department has won several awards including:

- International Motion Art Awards 11 Winner Animation (2023)
- American Illustration 42, Selected and Chosen Winner (2023)
- The Society of Illustrators, Illustrators 64 Exhibit (2022)
- American Illustration 41, Selected and Chosen Winner (2022)
- American Illustration 40, Chosen Winner (2021)
- American Illustration 39, Chosen Winner (2020)

== See also ==
- Bankrate
- Credit Karma
- Investopedia
- LendingTree
- MarketWatch
- NerdWallet
- WalletHub
