= Sanford Health =

Health system based in Sioux Falls, South Dakota, U.S.

- Logo since 2010
- Type: Private
- Industry: Health care
- Founded: May 28, 1997; 29 years ago, in Sioux Falls, South Dakota, U.S.
- Headquarters: Sioux Falls, South Dakota, U.S.
- Number of locations: 382
- Area served: Iowa, Minnesota, Nebraska, Wisconsin, North Dakota, Oklahoma, South Dakota, California, Mexico, Ghana, China, Canada and Germany
- Key people: Bill Gassen (president & CEO); JoAnn Kunkel (CFO); Jennifer Grennan (CLO)
- Revenue: 2,379,772,843 United States dollar (2011)
- Total assets: 1,577,600,190 United States dollar (2011)
- Number of employees: 47,000+ (2021)
- Website: www.sanfordhealth.org
- Footnotes; Key People

Sanford Health is an American nonprofit integrated health system headquartered in Sioux Falls, South Dakota, United States, with additional offices in North Dakota, in Fargo and Bismarck, and in Bemidji, Minnesota. It is one of the largest nonprofit health systems in the United States and describes itself as the largest rural health system in the country. As of 2026, Sanford Health operates 58 hospitals, 289 clinic locations and 145 senior care communities, with approximately 55,000 employees and 4,500 physicians and advanced practice providers. The organization serves more than 2 million patients across South Dakota, North Dakota, Minnesota, Iowa, Wyoming, Wisconsin and Michigan's Upper Peninsula.

Sanford Health traces its origins to the opening of Sioux Falls Hospital in 1894. The organization subsequently became Sioux Falls Lutheran Hospital, Sioux Valley Hospital and later Sioux Valley Health System before adopting the Sanford Health name in 2007 following a $400 million philanthropic commitment from South Dakota businessman Denny Sanford.

The system expanded substantially through mergers and affiliations with health organizations across the Upper Midwest. Major combinations included MeritCare Health System in 2009, North Country Health Services in Bemidji, Minnesota, in 2011, Medcenter One in Bismarck, North Dakota, in 2012, the Evangelical Lutheran Good Samaritan Society in 2019, Black Hills Surgical Hospital and affiliated organizations in western South Dakota in 2024, Marshfield Clinic Health System in 2025 and North Memorial Health in Minnesota in 2026.

== History ==
=== Background ===
Sanford Health was preceded in its foundation by the original Sioux Falls Hospital. In 1893, local physicians, clergy and community members began organizing a hospital for the growing city. The Sioux Falls Hospital was located in the Seney House in Sioux Falls, South Dakota, United States. It officially opened In September 1894, becoming the first hospital in Sioux Falls history. The Seney House was named for George I. Seney, a banker, art collector, and benefactor from New York, New York. The hospital moved to a larger facility in 1898 and changed its name to Sioux Falls Lutheran Hospital in 1900.

That same year, the Sioux Falls Training School for Nurses was formed and was affiliated with the Sioux Falls Hospital. In July 1925, the Sioux Falls Lutheran Hospital and the Bethany Hospital Association merged to form the Sioux Valley Hospital Association. The resulting entity had a 21-person board containing businessmen and members of the clergy. The Bethany Hospital Association had been formed in 1923 to oversee the expansion of the Moe Hospital in Sioux Falls. By 1926, plans for a new hospital were unveiled. The six-story hospital officially opened in June 1930 as the Sioux Valley Hospital.

=== Early history and merger with MeritCare ===
Sanford Health was officially formed on May 28, 1997 as the Sioux Valley Hospitals & Health System. At the time of its incorporation, Sioux Valley Hospitals & Health System had 20 hospitals, 32 clinics, and eight nursing homes. Discussions of a health system began in the late 1980s. In 2004, Denny Sanford, a local billionaire, philanthropist, and founder of First Premier Bank, began making donations to Sioux Valley Hospitals & Health System. This included a February 2004 donation of $16 million for what would eventually become the Sanford Children's Hospital, which opened in February 2009. In 2007, Sanford made a $400 million donation to the system, the largest ever to a hospital system at the time. The Sioux Valley Hospitals & Health System officially changed its name to Sanford Health on February 3, 2007.

On June 18, 2009, it was announced that Sanford Health would be merging with the MeritCare Health System of Fargo, North Dakota. MeritCare Health system was formed in 1908 in Fargo At the time of the merger, MeritCare Health System owned three hospitals, 44 clinics, and had 7,000 employees and was the largest hospital system in North Dakota. The merger gave the combined health organization coverage over five U.S. states, North Dakota, South Dakota, Minnesota, Iowa, and Nebraska. The merger was officially approved by Sanford Health's board, and the two systems merged to form Sanford Health & MeritCare on November 3, 2009. However, the name was later changed to Sanford Health on July 20, 2010.

== Facilities ==
Sanford Health operates several hospitals in South Dakota, North Dakota, Minnesota, Iowa, Wyoming, Wisconsin and Michigan's Upper Peninsula. Sanford Health's primary hospital, Sanford USD Medical Center, in Sioux Falls, serves as the largest hospital in South Dakota. A level I trauma center, Sanford USD Medical Center is affiliated with the Sanford School of Medicine of the University of South Dakota. Also on the site is the Sanford Children's Hospital, a level II pediatric trauma center. Sanford Medical Center Fargo, in Fargo, North Dakota, is a level I trauma center. Sanford Medical Center Bismarck in Bismarck, North Dakota is a level II trauma center.

== Services ==
=== Sanford Heart Hospital ===
Directly connected to Sanford USD Medical Center and provides cardiovascular care, including diagnostic testing, cardiac and vascular surgery, catheterization and cardiac rehabilitation.

=== Sanford Cancer Center ===
Provides cancer and hematology care and has served as a regional referral center since 1982. Its services include medical oncology, hematology and radiation oncology.

=== Sanford Orthopedic Hospital ===
Sanford Orthopedic Hospital opened on the Sanford USD Medical Center campus in January 2026. The 161,000-square-foot facility includes 12 operating rooms, 35 pre- and postoperative rooms, imaging services and rehabilitation space.

=== Edith Sanford Breast Center ===
The Edith Sanford Breast Center opened on the Sanford USD Medical Center campus in 2016. The center provides breast cancer screening, diagnosis and treatment and includes breast imaging, genetic counseling and high-risk breast services.

=== Sanford Children's Hospital ===
Sanford Health operates three children's hospitals in Sioux Falls, Fargo, and Bismarck. The Sanford Children's Hospital in Sioux Falls is adjacent to Sanford USD Medical Center, a level II pediatric trauma center that opened in 2009. Sanford Children's Hospital Fargo is located on the campus of Sanford Medical Center Fargo, and is also a level II pediatric trauma center. Sanford Children's Hospital Bismarck is located on the campus of Sanford Medical Center Bismarck.

=== Sanford Research ===
Sanford Research is a not-for-profit medical research organization. Sanford Research is responsible for basic and clinical research in pediatrics and rare diseases, cancer biology and immunotherapies, cellular therapy and stem cell biology, behavioral sciences, diabetes, and genetics and genomics. was formed on February 16, 1999, as the South Dakota Health Research Foundation. It was formed through a partnership with Sanford Health and the University of South Dakota. The South Dakota Health Research Foundation would later re-brand to Sanford Health in 2007. Sanford Research has locations in both Sioux Falls and Fargo.

== See also ==
- Sanford USD Medical Center
- Sanford Children's Hospital
- Sanford School of Medicine
- Sanford Research
- Good Samaritan Society
- Marshfield Clinic Health System
- North Memorial Health
- T. Denny Sanford
- Healthcare in South Dakota
