= Director of nursing =

Director of nursing may refer to

- Director of nursing (long term care facility)
- Director of nursing (other uses)
