= InGeneron =

Private multinational medical device and biotechnology company

InGeneron Inc.
- Type: Private
- Industry: Health Technology, Biotechnology
- Founded: 2006
- Headquarters: Houston, Texas, United States
- Area served: USA, Europe, Middle East
- Key people: Angelo Moesslang (CEO); Ron Stubbers (President); Eckhard Alt (Founder, Chairman of the Board)
- Products: Regenerative cell separation and diagnostic tools
- Number of employees: 32
- Divisions: Wound Care; Aesthetics & Reconstruction; Orthopedics and Spine; Cardiovascular; Animal Health
- Subsidiaries: InGeneron GmbH; InGeneron Equine GmbH; eticur) GmbH
- Website: www.ingeneron.com

InGeneron Inc. is a private multinational medical device and biotechnology company headquartered in Houston, Texas, United States, and with European headquarters in Munich, Germany. InGeneron develops, manufactures, licenses and sells regenerative cell separation and diagnostics tools. InGeneron's technologies enable the preparation of adipose-derived regenerative cells (ADRC) that contain progenitor and stem cells in humans and animals for autologous use.

== History ==
InGeneron was founded in 2006, through a recapitalization of aDEPtas, Inc. in Houston, Texas with the focus on translating fundamental research in the regenerative medicine field into clinical practice. Over 40 peer-reviewed studies have been published by InGeneron's team in collaboration with various renowned academic facilities. In 2010, the fully owned subsidiary InGeneron GmbH in Munich was founded to serve as its European headquarters. In 2015, InGeneron Equine GmbH was founded in Germany, which focuses on treating orthopedic indications of sports horses. In 2015, the German-based stem cell banking company eticur) was acquired with the idea of supporting eticur) with scientific evidence from InGeneron's laboratory. In 2012, InGeneron's technology was also used to treat a Malayan tiger at the Houston zoo. In March 2017, InGeneron raised $20 million in Series D funding from Sanford Health.

== Products ==
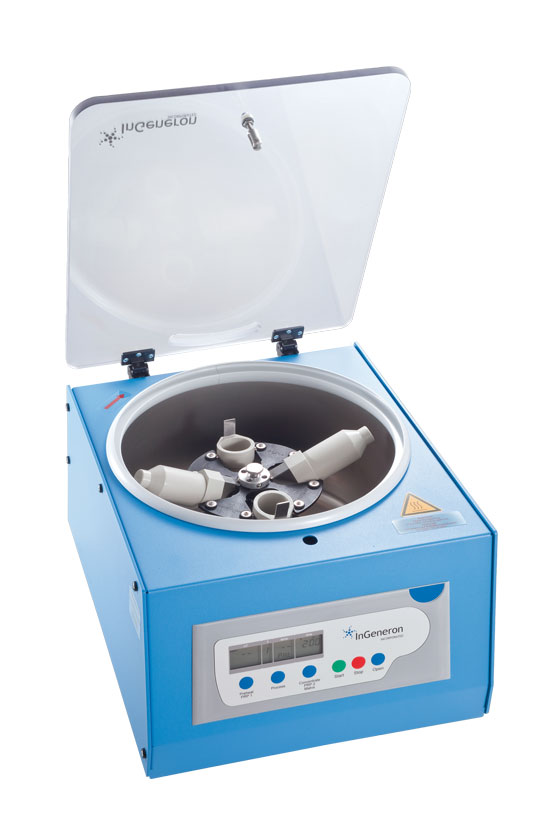
InGeneron's preprogrammed and heatable Tissue Processing Unit

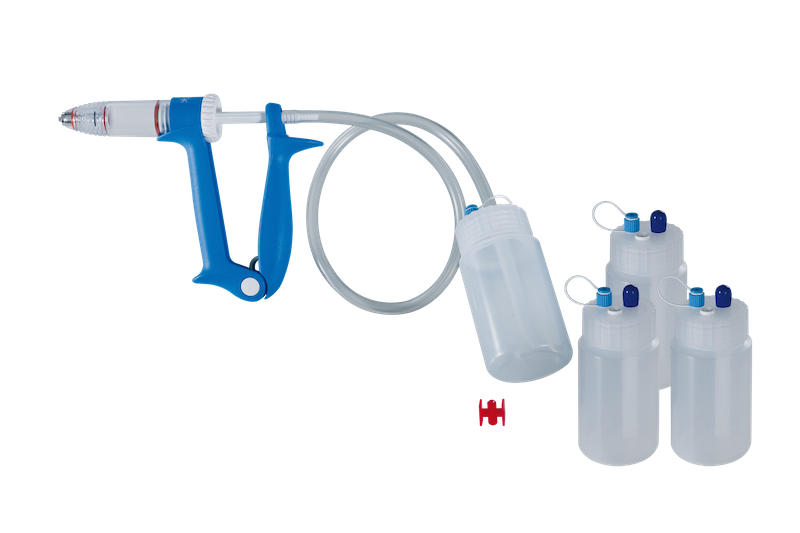
A complete InGeneron SmartGraft 200 system with Mr. Squeezy for fat grafting

InGeneron develops and manufactures biomedical equipment that is designed to fit into the workflow of an operating physician for the easy recovery of regenerative cells from the adipose tissue.

An efficient point-of-care processing system that isolates regenerative cells from adipose tissue has been developed. This system relies on a proprietary enzyme blend and centrifuge technology to isolate and prepare regenerative cells with high yield from adipose tissue within one hour after extraction.

Initial results in the veterinary space show that possible treatment areas include orthopedic injuries, osteoarthritis, incontinence, soft tissue reconstruction and non-healing wounds in animals.

=== Transpose RT System ===
Consisting of the disposables for processing and the Tissue Processing Unit, the Transpose RT System is InGeneron's system that allows for point-of-care preparation of regenerative cells. The collected tissue is processed with the InGeneron Tissue Processing Unit, which is a semi-automated, heatable centrifuge that is developed to process tissue prior to stem cell extraction and uses proprietary agitation to assist in the separation of the regenerative cells.

This system is used in conjunction with the Matrase enzyme that ensures a high yield of regenerative cells. The proprietary enzyme is designed to quickly and gently release from adipose tissue the adult regenerative cells.

=== Accessories ===
For the extraction and processing, InGeneron provides:

- Lipoaspiration Collection Kit
- Transpose® RT Lipoaspirate Processing System
- Transpose® RT Tissue Processing System
- SmartGraft 30 and SmartGraft 200 System for fat grafting procedures

For veterinarian use, InGeneron provides:

- Lipoaspirate Collection Kit
- ARC® Lipoaspirate Processing System (Quad-Pack of the Transpose RT Lipoaspirate Processing System, adapted for veterinary use)
- ARC® Tissue Processing System (Quad-Pack of the Transpose RT Tissue Processing System, adapted for veterinary use)
- ARC® Platelet-Rich-Plasma System

== Regulatory ==
The InGeneron Processing Unit as well as disposable packs such as the Lipoaspiration Collection Kit, Transpose RT Lipoaspirate Processing Kit and the SmartGraft Systems are CE marked and meet the requirements of the applicable EC directive.

The Matrase enzymatic agent is manufactured mammalian origin free and in strict compliance with cGMP guidelines.

The SmartGraft 30 and SmartGraft 200 System have 510(k) approval in the US market.
