= Christina Hansen =

Christina Hansen may refer to:

- Christina Roslyng Christiansen (born 1978), Danish handball player
- Christina Hansen (footballer) (born 1970), Danish footballer
- Christina Aistrup Hansen (born 1985), Danish nurse
