= Christopher Duntsch =

American former neurosurgeon convicted of criminal malpractice (born 1971)

- Duntsch's July 2015 mugshot, taken by the Dallas County Sheriff's Office
- Born: Christopher Daniel Duntsch; April 3, 1971 (age 55); Montana, U.S.
- Education: Memphis State University (BS); University of Tennessee Health Science Center (MD-PhD)
- Occupation: Surgeon (former)
- Conviction: February 20, 2017
- Criminal charge: Injury to an elderly person
- Penalty: Life with 30 years minimum

Details
- Imprisoned at: Incarcerated at O. B. Ellis Unit of the Texas Department of Criminal Justice, earliest possible parole July 20, 2045

Christopher Daniel Duntsch (born April 3, 1971) is a former American neurosurgeon who has been nicknamed Dr. Death for general and gross neurosurgical malpractice while working at hospitals in the Dallas–Fort Worth metroplex. He was accused of injuring 33 out of 38 patients in less than two years, resulting in the maiming of 31 patients and the deaths of 2 others. He was allowed to continue practicing because hospital officials and regulators were incredulous that a surgeon could be incompetent to such an apparent degree. His license was finally revoked by the Texas Medical Board in 2013. In 2017, Duntsch was convicted of maiming one of his patients and sentenced to life imprisonment.

== Early life ==
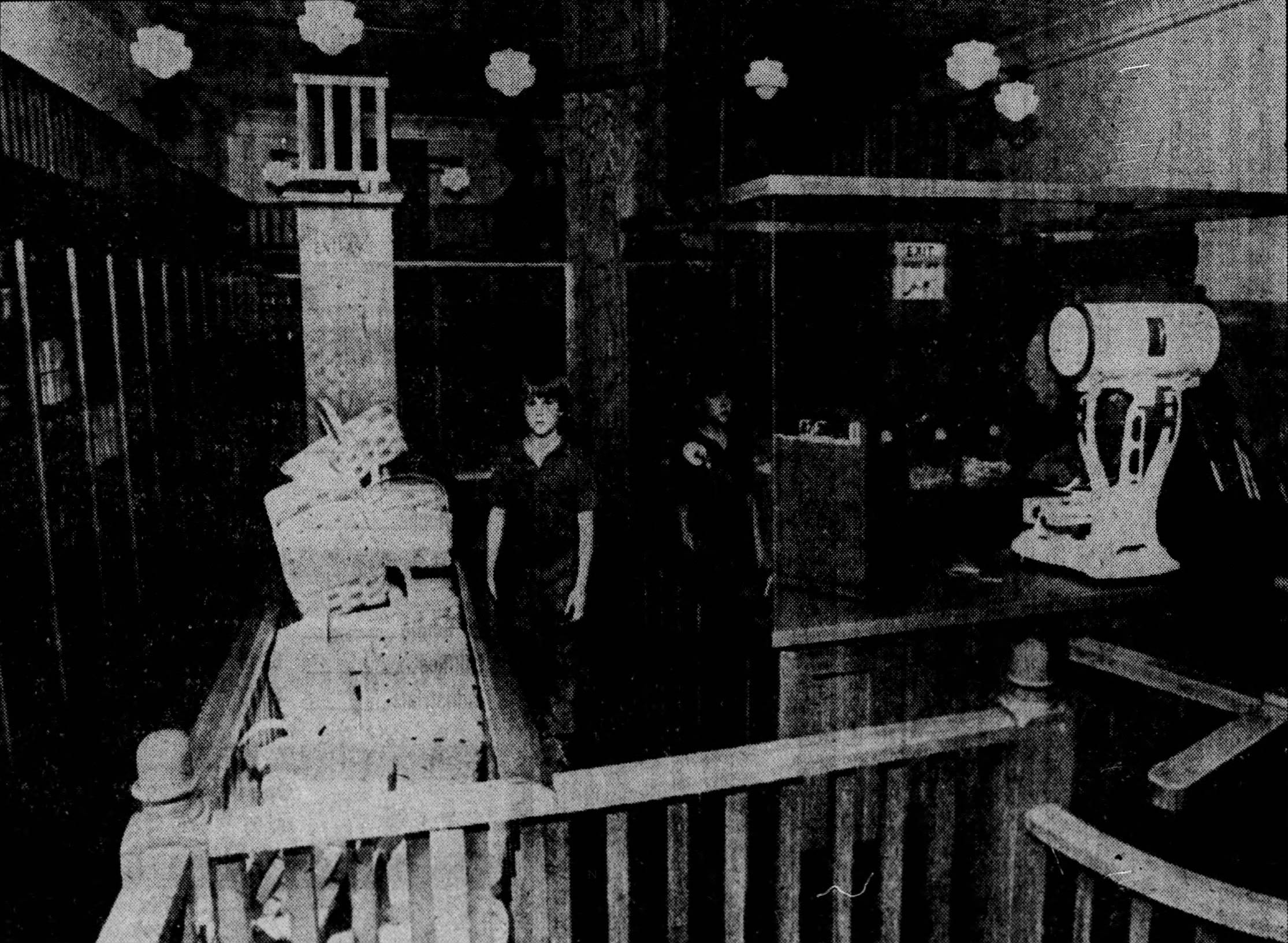
Nine-year-old Duntsch at the Pink Palace's replica of the first Piggly Wiggly in 1980

Christopher Duntsch was born in Montana and spent most of his youth in Memphis, Tennessee. His father, Donald, was a physical therapist and Christian missionary, and his mother, Susan, was a schoolteacher. He was the oldest of four children. Duntsch is a graduate of Evangelical Christian School in Cordova, Tennessee, where he was a football player.

Duntsch initially attended Millsaps College to play Division III college football, and later transferred to Division I Colorado State University. Former teammates later said Duntsch trained hard but lacked talent. Duntsch returned home to attend Memphis State University (now the University of Memphis). Though he hoped to play football again, Duntsch had exhausted his football eligibility, and decided to switch to a career in medicine. He completed his undergraduate degree at Memphis State in 1995.

== Medical training ==
After graduating from Memphis State, he continued on to an MD–PhD program at the University of Tennessee at Memphis College of Medicine, earning degrees in 2001 and 2002. In 2010, Duntsch completed the MD–PhD and neurosurgery residency programs at the University of Tennessee Health Science Center, and then a spine fellowship program at the Semmes-Murphey Clinic in Memphis.

Duntsch participated in fewer than 100 surgeries during his residency and fellowship; neurosurgery residents typically participate in over 1,000 surgeries. He was suspected of being under the influence of cocaine while operating during his fourth year of residency training. He was sent to a program for impaired physicians for several months before being allowed to return to the residency. Duntsch's supervisors were concerned enough that they did not allow him to operate without direct supervision. Several of Duntsch's friends recalled him going to work after a night of doing drugs, with one saying he would never allow Duntsch to operate on him.

A regular in Memphis strip clubs, Duntsch came to the attention of exotic dancer Wendy Renee Young. In 2011, Young approached Duntsch at a club upon noticing that "all the [other] girls were over there", making her aware that he was a doctor and that "of course, that’s where you're going to go for money". She immediately moved in with him. They had two sons together, and broke up just before the birth of their second son in September 2014.

== Career ==
Initially, Duntsch focused heavily on the PhD half of his degree. His name appeared on several papers and patents, and he took part in a number of biotech startups. However, by the time he met Young, Duntsch was over $500,000 in debt. He decided to turn to neurosurgery, which can be a lucrative field. In 2010, Duntsch moved to Dallas, Texas. He persuaded Young to come with him since she grew up in the Dallas area.

Duntsch appeared extremely qualified on paper: he had spent fifteen years in training (medical school, residency and fellowship), and his curriculum vitae was twelve single-spaced pages. Duntsch also falsely claimed to have graduated magna cum laude from St. Jude Children’s Research Hospital with a doctorate in microbiology – a program the hospital did not offer when he allegedly attended. Duntsch soon joined Baylor Regional Medical Center at Plano (now Baylor Scott & White Medical Center – Plano) as a minimally invasive spine surgeon with a salary of $600,000 per year plus bonuses.

=== Baylor Plano ===
Early in his tenure at Baylor Plano, Duntsch made a poor impression on his fellow surgeons. Veteran vascular surgeon Randall Kirby recalled that Duntsch frequently boasted about his abilities despite being new to the area. He also recalled that Duntsch's skills in the operating room left much to be desired; as Kirby put it, "he could not wield a scalpel".

Several of Duntsch's surgeries at Baylor Plano resulted in severely maimed patients:

- Kenneth Fennell, the first patient Duntsch operated on at Baylor Plano, was left with chronic pain after Duntsch operated on the wrong part of his back. Fennell later had a second operation by Duntsch to relieve it and was left paralyzed in his legs. Fennell required months of rehabilitation to walk with a cane and was left unable to walk over thirty feet or stand for more than a few minutes.
- Lee Passmore, a Collin County medical investigator, experienced chronic pain and limited mobility after Duntsch cut a ligament not normally touched during that particular procedure, misplaced hardware in his spine, incorrectly located a screw used to keep the hardware in place, and stripped its threads so it could not be removed. Even if Duntsch had not stripped the threads, he placed the screw in a location that would have caused Passmore to bleed out if it had been removed. Vascular surgeon Mark Hoyle, who assisted with the operation, later recalled that Duntsch seemed oblivious to considerable bleeding. Hoyle became so disturbed by Duntsch's actions that at one point he physically restrained him, and later told Duntsch to his face that he was dangerous. Duntsch's behavior led Hoyle to question his sanity.
- Barry Morguloff, the owner of a pool service company, was left with bone fragments in his spinal canal after Duntsch tried to pull a damaged disc out of his back with a grabbing tool. Duntsch initially refused to give Morguloff any pain medication, claiming he was a "drug seeker." Morguloff eventually lost most function on his left side and required a wheelchair. Kirby assisted with the surgery and recalled that Duntsch continued making mistakes even after having the correct anatomy pointed out to him. Morguloff later recalled that he walked out on a follow-up visit with Duntsch when he displayed clear signs of being inebriated.
- Jerry Summers, a longtime friend of Duntsch, came to Baylor Plano to have two neck vertebrae fused. During the operation, Duntsch botched the removal of a disk, rendering Summers a quadriplegic. He performed a second surgery and packed the space with a large amount of gel foam, constricting the spinal cord. The anesthesiologist who worked on the surgery recalled that Summers lost almost 1,200 milliliters of blood, more than a fifth of his blood volume and almost twenty-four times the typical amount lost in a spinal fusion. The nurses and other staffers who took part in the surgery expected Summers to have revision surgery, but Duntsch refused to do it. Summers later stated that he and Duntsch used cocaine the night before his surgery. Although he passed a drug test, Baylor Plano officials were concerned enough to force Duntsch on leave pending a peer review. While Duntsch was cleared to resume operating while the review was underway, hospital officials requested he limit himself to minor surgeries until it was complete. Summers then admitted the cocaine claim was untrue and said he made it up after being upset that Duntsch refused to check on him. Summers remained a quadriplegic and died in 2021 of an infection related to complications from Duntsch's operation.
- Kellie Martin was undergoing a routine decompression operation—the simplest type of spine surgery— when Duntsch cut through her spinal cord and severed an artery. He continued operating despite clear signs that Martin was losing a large volume of blood, over warnings by a trauma surgeon colleague and anesthesiologist. Duntsch refused to acknowledge anything was wrong, hindering the ICU team's efforts to save Martin. When she awoke from anesthesia, she was screaming and clawing at her legs, forcing the ICU team to re-anesthetize her. Duntsch also stayed out in the ICU waiting room writing notes rather than attending his patient, even after Martin went into hemorrhagic cardiac arrest. Martin ultimately bled to death.

Baylor Plano officials found that Duntsch failed to meet their standards of care and permanently revoked his surgical privileges. The hospital initiated another peer review, but Duntsch resigned rather than face certain termination. To avoid the costs of fighting and possibly losing a wrongful termination suit, as well as possible patient lawsuits for Duntsch's botched surgeries, Baylor Plano officials agreed with Duntsch's lawyers that he could resign in return for the hospital issuing a letter stating that there were no issues with him. Had Duntsch been fired, Baylor Plano would have been required to report him to the National Practitioner Data Bank (NPDB), which is intended to flag problematic physicians.

=== Dallas Medical Center ===
Duntsch moved to the Dallas Medical Center in Farmers Branch, where he was granted temporary privileges until hospital officials could obtain his records from Baylor Plano. Red flags surfaced early on, as nurses wondered if he was under the influence of drugs while on call. For instance, Duntsch came to work wearing the same tattered scrubs for three days in a row. He lasted for less than a week before administrators pulled his privileges after the death of a patient, Floella Brown, and the maiming of another, Mary Efurd.

Duntsch had severed Brown's vertebral artery and refused to abort the surgery despite massive blood loss. He then packed it with too much of a substance intended to stop the bleeding. Brown suffered a stroke as a result. Duntsch did not respond to messages from the hospital for a few hours, then the next day scheduled an elective surgery on Efurd rather than care for Brown. Hospital officials were exasperated when Duntsch refused to delay Efurd's surgery, and asked him multiple times to care for Brown or transfer her out of his care. Duntsch suggested he perform a craniotomy on Brown to relieve the pressure. Hospital officials refused to allow it; not only was Duntsch unqualified for brain surgery, but Dallas Medical Center did not have the equipment or personnel for such an operation. Brown was left in a coma for hours, and was brain dead by the time Duntsch finally acquiesced to her transfer.

While performing a spinal fusion on Efurd, Duntsch severed one of her nerve roots while operating on the wrong portion of her back, twisted a screw into another nerve, left screw holes on the opposite side of her spine, failed to remove the disc he was supposed to remove, and left surgical hardware in her muscle tissue so loose that it moved when touched. Despite several warnings from his colleagues that he was not doing the surgery correctly and was attempting to put screws into muscle rather than bone, Duntsch persisted. Efurd was left paralyzed. She later recalled waking up feeling "excruciating pain" of "ten-plus" on a scale of one to ten. Several people in the operating room for Efurd's surgery suspected Duntsch might have been intoxicated, recalling that his pupils were constricted.

Longtime spine surgeon Robert Henderson performed the salvage surgery on Efurd; he would subsequently be called in to perform salvage procedures on many of Duntsch's patients. When he saw the imaging from Duntsch's surgery, he was so certain that there would be legal action that he had the salvage surgery recorded. Henderson likened what he found when he opened up Efurd to the results of a child playing with Tinkertoys or an erector set, not surgery. He described Duntsch's surgery as an "assault" and concluded that Efurd would have been bedridden for the rest of her life had the salvage surgery not been performed.

The damage to Efurd led Henderson to wonder if Duntsch was an impostor, as he could not believe that a real surgeon would botch Efurd's surgery so badly; in his view, anyone with basic knowledge of human anatomy would realize the wrong area of Efurd's back was being operated on. Henderson sent Duntsch's picture to the University of Tennessee to determine whether he actually had a degree from that institution and received confirmation that he did, leading him to conclude that Duntsch "had to have known how to do it right, and then did the opposite." He called Duntsch's fellowship supervisor in Memphis, and the supervisor of Duntsch's residency; it was then that he learned about the incident that led him to be referred to the impaired physician program.

Despite both of his surgeries at Dallas Medical going catastrophically awry, hospital officials did not report him to the NPDB. At the time, hospitals were not required to report doctors who only had temporary privileges.

=== Other hospitals ===
After leaving Dallas Medical, Duntsch received privileges at South Hampton Community Hospital in Dallas, and also took a job at an outpatient clinic named Legacy Surgery Center (now Frisco Ambulatory Surgery Center) in Frisco. There, he damaged patient Jeff Cheney's spinal cord, leaving him without feeling on the right side of his body. He then damaged patient Philip Mayfield's spinal cord, drilling into it and leaving him partially paralyzed from the neck down. After undergoing physical rehabilitation, Mayfield was able to walk with a cane but continued to experience paralysis on the right side of his body and in his left arm. He also reported shooting pains throughout his body. Mayfield died of COVID-19 in February 2021; according to his wife, he had been vulnerable to the virus due to the complications of being maimed by Duntsch.

While attempting to remove degenerated discs in Marshall "Tex" Muse's back, Duntsch left surgical hardware floating between the spine and muscle tissue. Muse woke up in considerable pain, but Duntsch convinced him it was normal. He then prescribed Muse so much Percocet that a pharmacist refused to fill the prescription; the pharmacist feared Duntsch was trying to kill Muse. Muse spiraled into opioid addiction that cost him his wife and his job. He later recalled that he read about Kellie Martin's death on the day before the surgery, but Duntsch had cursed him out when he called to ask about it.

While operating on Jacqueline Troy, Duntsch damaged her vocal cords, her trachea and an artery. Troy was left barely able to speak above a whisper, had to be sedated for weeks and had to be fed through a feeding tube for some time as food was entering her lungs. Despite this, Duntsch was retained by South Hampton when new owners bought it and renamed it University General Hospital.

When Duntsch applied for privileges at Methodist Hospital in Dallas, the hospital queried the NPDB. Soon afterward, he severely maimed Jeff Glidewell after mistaking part of his neck muscle for a tumor during a routine cervical fusion, severing one of his vocal cords, cutting a hole in his esophagus, and slicing an artery. Duntsch stuffed a surgical sponge in Glidewell's throat to stanch the bleeding. However, he closed Glidewell with the sponge in place despite others in the operating room warning him about it. The sponge triggered a severe blood-borne infection that caused Glidewell to become septic. When other doctors discovered the sponge, Duntsch refused to return to help remove it.

After several days, Kirby was brought in to repair the damage. He later described what he found after opening Glidewell back up as the work of a "crazed maniac". He later told Glidewell that it was clear Duntsch tried to kill him. Glidewell was left with only one vocal cord, permanent damage to his esophagus and partial paralysis on his left side. Kirby claimed that it looked as if Duntsch had tried to decapitate Glidewell and contended that such a botched surgery "has not happened in the United States of America" before. Glidewell was reportedly still suffering the ill effects of Duntsch's operation years later and has undergone more than fifty procedures to correct the damage. At one point, he could only eat small bites of food. He proved to be Duntsch's last patient; University General pushed him out soon afterward.

== Medical license revoked ==
Kirby wrote a detailed complaint to the Texas Medical Board, calling Duntsch a "sociopath" who was "a clear and present danger to the citizens of Texas." Under heavy lobbying from Kirby and Henderson, the Texas Medical Board suspended Duntsch's license on June 26, 2013. The lead investigator on the case later revealed that she wanted Duntsch's license suspended while the ten-month probe was underway, but board attorneys were unwilling to agree. According to board chairman Irwin Zeitzler, many board members found it hard to believe that a trained surgeon could be as incompetent as Duntsch appeared; it took until June 2013 to find the "pattern of patient injury" required to justify suspending Duntsch's license. Zeitzler later argued that complications were more common in neurosurgery than most laymen believe. However, Dr. Martin Lazar, a veteran neurosurgeon that the board consulted on the case, was scathingly critical of Duntsch's work. Lazar was particularly angered that Duntsch missed signs that Martin was bleeding out, saying, "You can't not know [that] and be a neurosurgeon." The Texas Medical Board revoked Duntsch's license on December 6, 2013.

Duntsch moved to Denver, Colorado, where he went into a downward spiral. He declared bankruptcy after listing debts of over $1 million. He was arrested for driving under the influence in Denver, taken for a psychiatric evaluation in Dallas during a visit to see his children, and was arrested in Dallas for shoplifting. After The Texas Observer covered his arrest, Duntsch wrote a 30,000-word manifesto in the comments section rebutting his critics. He vowed to sue various newspapers that quoted Kirby's description of him.

== Lawsuits ==
In March 2014, three of Duntsch's former patients — Mary Efurd, Kenneth Fennel and Lee Passmore — filed separate federal lawsuits against Baylor Plano, alleging the hospital allowed Duntsch to perform surgeries despite knowing that he was a dangerous physician. Then-Texas Attorney General (later Governor) Greg Abbott filed a motion to intervene in the suits to defend Baylor Plano, citing the 2003 Texas statute that capped civil damages for medical malpractice at $250,000 and removed the term "gross negligence" from the legal definition of malice. The suit alleged that Baylor Plano made an average net profit of $65,000 on every spinal surgery performed by Duntsch.

== Criminal charges ==
Henderson and Kirby feared that Duntsch could move elsewhere and still theoretically get a medical license. Convinced that he was a clear and present danger to the public, they urged the Dallas County district attorney's office to pursue criminal charges. The inquiry went nowhere until 2015, when the statute of limitations on any potential charges was due to run out. Part of the problem was being able to prove that Duntsch's actions were willful and intentional as defined by Texas law. After interviewing dozens of his patients and their survivors, prosecutors concluded that Duntsch's actions were indeed criminal, and nothing short of imprisonment would prevent him from practicing medicine again.

As part of their investigation, prosecutors obtained a December 2011 email in which Duntsch boasted that he was "... ready to leave the love and kindness and goodness and patience that I mix with everything else that I am and become a cold blooded [sic] killer." ADA Michelle Shughart, who led the prosecution of Duntsch, later recalled that Henderson, Kirby, and Lazar contacted her demanding to testify against Duntsch; according to Shughart, doctors almost never testify against each other. In an article for The Texas Prosecutor, the journal of the Texas District and County Attorneys Association, Shughart and other members of the trial team recalled that their superiors were initially skeptical when presented with the case, but eventually found themselves in "overwhelming disbelief" that a surgeon could do what Duntsch was accused of doing. As the trial team put it, the "scary pattern" of Duntsch's actions became apparent to others in the office. Ultimately, the DA agreed that the only way to stop Duntsch was to put him in prison, and gave the green light to take the case to a grand jury.

== Arrest and prosecution ==
In July 2015, approximately a year and a half after his medical license was revoked, Duntsch was arrested in Dallas and charged with six felony counts of aggravated assault with a deadly weapon, five counts of aggravated assault causing serious bodily injury and one count of injury to an elderly person. The indictments were made four months before the statute of limitations would have expired.

The last charge was for the maiming and paralyzing of Efurd. Prosecutors put a high priority on that charge, as it provided the widest sentencing range, with Duntsch facing up to life in prison if convicted. They also believed that charge was easy to prove in court; Duntsch was told repeatedly that he was not placing the hardware in the correct position and fluoroscopy images from Efurd's surgery proved this. Prosecutors sought a sentence long enough to ensure that Duntsch could never practice medicine again. For the same reason, prosecutors opted to try Duntsch for Efurd's maiming first. He was held in the Dallas County jail for almost two years until the case went to trial in 2017. By this time, Duntsch was almost penniless, and the court appointed a lawyer for him.

Shughart argued that Duntsch should have known he was likely to hurt others unless he changed his approach, and that his failure to learn from his past mistakes demonstrated that his maiming of Efurd was intentional. By her team's estimate, between them Duntsch's patients lost 23 liters of blood, more than ten times what they should have lost had he operated correctly. Prosecutors faulted Duntsch's supervisors at the University of Tennessee for signing off on his credentials despite knowing about his history of drug abuse. They also faulted his employers for not reporting him. They argued that Duntsch was motivated to continue operating because the lucrative salary of a neurosurgeon would solve his mounting financial problems.

Over objections from Duntsch's lawyers, prosecutors called Passmore, Morgoloff, and Summers as witnesses in order to prove that his actions were intentional. They also called Martin and Brown's families to testify as well. Prosecutors wanted to show that Duntsch knew he was "reasonably certain" to maim Efurd, and should have never taken her into surgery. According to his lawyers, Duntsch did not realize how poorly he had performed as a surgeon until he heard the prosecution experts tell the jury about his many blunders in the operating room. Duntsch's defense blamed their client's actions on poor training and lack of oversight by the hospitals. Shughart countered that the 2011 email, sent after his first surgeries went wrong, proved that Duntsch knew his actions were intentional.

After thirteen days of trial, the jury needed only four hours to convict Duntsch for the maiming of Efurd. At the punishment phase (as the penalty phase is called in Texas), prosecutors called 10 more patients who had been maimed by Duntsch after he maimed Efurd. They argued that Duntsch had "sentenced his patients to a life of pain (or death)," and "deserved the same lifelong sentence" they received. On February 20, 2017, the jury needed only an hour to sentence him to life in prison. On December 10, 2018, the Texas Court of Appeals affirmed Duntsch's conviction by a 2–1 split decision. On May 8, 2019, the Texas Court of Criminal Appeals refused Duntsch’s petition for discretionary review. The four hospitals that employed Duntsch have ongoing civil cases against him.

== Imprisonment ==
Duntsch, Texas Department of Criminal Justice #02139003, is housed at the O. B. Ellis Unit outside Huntsville. Even with credit for time served in the Dallas County jail before trial, he is not eligible for parole until July 2045, when he will be 74 years old.

== Reactions ==
Duntsch's conviction has been called a precedent-setting case, as it is believed to be the first time in U.S. history that a physician was convicted on criminal charges for actions taken in the course of medical work. The Dallas County district attorney's office called it "a historic case with respect to prosecuting a doctor who had done wrong during surgery."

Testifying for the defense, UT Southwestern director of neurosurgery Carlos Bagley said that "the only way this happens is that the entire system fails the patients." A neurosurgery expert for Duntsch's defense team himself said, "The conditions which created Dr. Duntsch still exist, thereby making it possible for another to come along."

== In popular culture ==
Wondery Media launched a podcast Dr. Death, with the first season of ten episodes focusing on Duntsch.

Dr. Death, an eight-episode television mini-series based on the podcast, began streaming on Peacock on July 15, 2021. It stars Joshua Jackson as Duntsch, Alec Baldwin as Robert Henderson, Christian Slater as Randall Kirby, and AnnaSophia Robb as Michelle Shughart. A follow-up docuseries, Dr. Death: The Undoctored Story, was later released on Peacock on July 29, 2021, featuring interviews with some of Duntsch's patients and colleagues, as well as with Henderson, Kirby and Shughart.

In 2019, Duntsch was the focus of the premiere episode of License to Kill, Oxygen's series on criminal medical professionals. Duntsch's criminal activity was also profiled in the 2021 episode "The Real Dr. Death", of the television series American Greed.

In 2024, an episode of Murder by Medic focused on Duntsch's case.

== See also ==
- Harold Shipman – English doctor and serial killer (1946–2004)
- Jayant Patel – Indian-born former surgeon and fraudster (born 1950)
- Michael Swango – American serial killer
- Ben Geen – British murderer
- Paolo Macchiarini – Italian physician (born 1958)
- William George Davis – American serial killer
