= Eckhard Alt =

German scientist and physician (born 1949)

Eckhard U. Alt (born 9 November 1949 in Pforzheim) is a German scientist and physician known for his contributions in cardiology and research.

== Early life ==
After attending Heidelberg University and University in Rhode Island, Alt completed his Staatsexamen as valedictorian in 1974. He completed his specialization in internal medicine, intensive care medicine and cardiology at the Klinikum Rechts der Isar of the Technical University of Munich after which he habilitated in 1984.

== Career ==
Alt is Professor of Medicine, Adjunct Professor for Biomedical Engineering and Director for Cardiovascular Research at Tulane University in New Orleans as well as the Todd and Linda Broin chair and Distinguished Professor of Sanford Health in South Dakota. He was also Professor of Medicine at the M.D. Anderson Cancer Center of University of Texas in Houston and a member of the medical faculty at the Technical University of Munich. Alt is also the co-founder of the European Cardiac Arrhythmia Society and was President of the International Cardiac Pacing and Electrophysiology Society for 8 years.

Procedures for therapies have been developed in Alt's research labs in Houston, New Orleans and Munich. He has inventions in the fields of therapy, electrophysiology as well as interventional cardiology and holds over 650 patents in key technologies that are used in pacemakers today. Eckhard Alt has authored numerous scientific publications and is a member of the editorial and review board of medical and scientific journals.

A number of companies have been founded by Alt. InFlow Dynamics, a medical technology company, developed and distributed heart catheters for interventional cardiology and was eventually acquired by Boston Scientific. His research at the M.D. Anderson Cancer Center in Houston resulted in the founding of the medical technology company InGeneron where he currently serves as chairman of the board. InGeneron offers products for the extraction of adult regenerative cells for autologous use in humans and animals. He is also founder and chairman of the supervisory board at ISAR Klinikum in Munich.

== Philanthropic work ==
Alt participates in charitable organizations and projects. In addition to various foundations that he started for the promotion of scientific research and education, he supports projects in developing countries. The Dodoma Medical Center in Dodoma, Tanzania as well as the Mamma Clementina girls school in Moshi are two institutions supported by him.

== Distinctions and honors ==
- Research prize of the European Society for Cardiovascular Surgery 1998
- Research prize of the Erasmus Universität Rotterdam als Best Cardiovascular Researcher 1997
- Named one of the leading cardiologists and specialists cardiac arrhythmia in the publications: Die besten 1.000 Ärzte (The best 1000 doctors) und Die besten 100 Kardiologen Deutschlands (The best 100 cardiologists in Germany
- Businessman of the Year 2009 in Munich
- Innovator of the Year 2009 in Houston

== Excerpt of publications ==
- A randomized comparison of antiplatelet and anticoagulant therapy after the placement of coronary-artery stents
- Effect of Glycoprotein IIb/IIIa Blockade on Recovery of Coronary Flow and Left Ventricular Function After the Placement of Coronary-Artery Stents in Acute
- Biodegradable coating with inhibitory properties for application to biocompatible materials
- Vascular and endoluminal stents with improved coatings
- Flexible implantable stent with composite design
