= Air embolism =

Vascular blockage by air bubbles

- Other names: Gas embolism
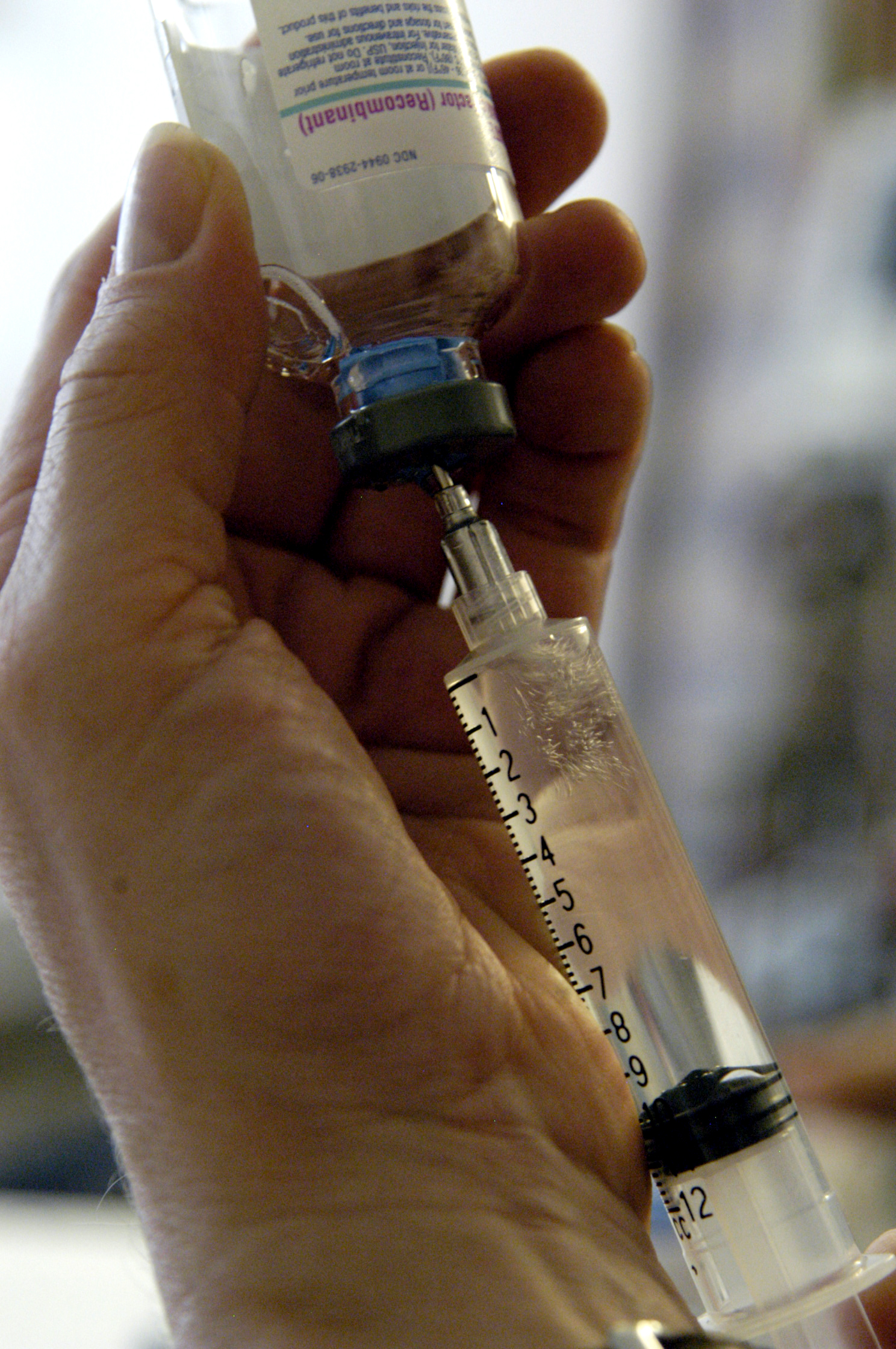
- Drug injection can potentially be a cause for air embolisms.
- Specialty: Critical care medicine
- Symptoms: Hypotension, headaches, vertigo, dizziness
- Complications: Coma
- Duration: Rapid
- Risk factors: Divers, substance abuse, improper needle usage, decompression sickness

An air embolism, also known as a gas embolism, is a blood vessel blockage caused by one or more bubbles of air or other gas in the circulatory system. Air can be introduced into the circulation during surgical procedures, lung over-expansion injury, decompression, and a few other causes. In flora, air embolisms may also occur in the xylem of vascular plants, especially those suffering from water stress.

Divers can develop arterial gas embolisms as a consequence of lung over-expansion injuries. Gas introduced into the venous system of the lungs by pulmonary barotrauma will not be trapped in the alveolar capillaries and will consequently be circulated to the rest of the body through the systemic arteries, with a high risk of embolism. Inert gas bubbles arising from decompression are generally formed in the venous side of the systemic circulation, where inert gas concentrations are highest. These bubbles are generally trapped in the capillaries of the lungs, where they will usually be eliminated without causing symptoms. If they are shunted to the systemic circulation through a patent foramen ovale, they can travel to and lodge in the brain, where they can cause embolic stroke; the coronary capillaries, where they can cause myocardial ischaemia; or other tissues, where the consequences are usually less critical. The first aid treatment is to administer oxygen at the highest practicable concentration, treat for shock and transport to a hospital where therapeutic recompression and hyperbaric oxygen therapy are the definitive treatment.

== Signs and symptoms ==
Air embolism after transgastral paracentesis of pancreatic pseudocyst after pancreatitis; Echocardiography (parasternal long axis)

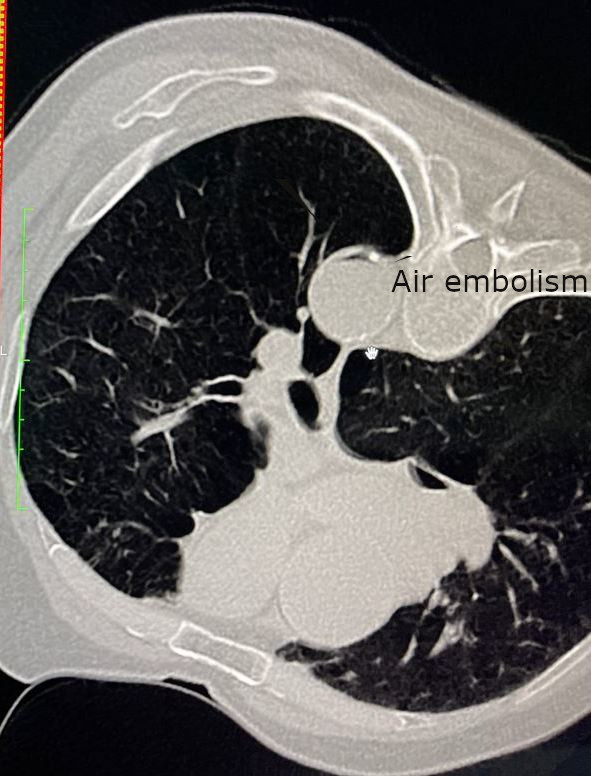
Air embolism in the descending thoracic aorta after CT guided percutaneous lung biopsy of a suspected lung tumour.

=== In surgery ===
Symptoms include:

- Hypotension (abnormally low blood pressure)
- Shortness of breath

=== In divers ===
Symptoms of arterial gas embolism include:

- Loss of consciousness
- Cessation of breathing
- Vertigo
- Convulsions
- Tremors
- Loss of coordination
- Loss of control of bodily functions
- Numbness
- Paralysis
- Extreme fatigue
- Weakness in the extremities
- Areas of abnormal sensation
- Visual abnormalities
- Hearing abnormalities
- Personality changes
- Cognitive impairment
- Nausea or vomiting
- Bloody sputum
- Symptoms of other consequences of lung overexpansion such as pneumothorax, subcutaneous or mediastinal emphysema may also be present.

== Causes ==
=== Interventional procedures ===
Interventional radiological, cardiac, and neurosurgical procedures can predispose to air embolism. Besides, increasing use of pump injectors for contrast delivery, and percutaneous intervention to the lungs also increases the risk of air embolism.

=== Decompression illness ===
Gas embolism is a diving disorder experienced by underwater divers who breathe gases at ambient pressure, and can happen in two distinct ways:

- Pulmonary barotrauma: Air bubbles can enter the bloodstream as a result of gross trauma to the lining of the lung following a rapid ascent while holding the breath; the air held within the lung expands to the point where the tissues tear (pulmonary barotrauma). This is easy to do as the lungs give little warning through pain until they do burst. The diver will usually arrive at the surface in pain and distress and may froth or spit blood. A pulmonary barotrauma is usually obvious and may present quite differently from decompression sickness.
- Decompression sickness: Inert gas bubbles form in the bloodstream if the gas dissolved in the blood under pressure during the dive is not allowed sufficient time to be eliminated in solution on ascent. The symptoms may be subtle and not immediately noticeable, and may develop for some time after surfacing.

=== Ventilator induced pulmonary barotrauma ===
Trauma to the lung can also cause an air embolism. This may happen after a patient is placed on a ventilator and air is forced into an injured vein or artery, causing sudden death. Breath-holding while ascending from scuba diving may also force lung air into pulmonary arteries or veins in a similar manner, due to the pressure difference.

=== Direct injection ===
Air can be injected directly into a vein or artery accidentally during clinical procedures. Misuse of a syringe to meticulously remove air from the vascular tubing of a hemodialysis circuit can allow air into the vascular system. Venous air embolism is a rare complication of diagnostic and therapeutic procedures requiring catheterization of a vein or artery. If a significant embolism occurs, the cardiovascular, pulmonary, or central nervous system may be affected. Interventions to remove or mitigate the embolism may include procedures to reduce bubble size, or withdrawal of air from the right atrium.

The lethal dose for humans is considered theoretically between 3 and 5 ml per kg. It is estimated that 300-500 ml of gas introduced at a rate of 100 ml per sec would prove fatal.

== Mechanism ==
Air embolism can occur whenever a blood vessel is open and a pressure gradient exists favoring entry of gas. Because the circulatory pressure in most arteries and veins is greater than atmospheric pressure, an air embolus does not often happen when a blood vessel is injured. In the veins above the heart, such as in the head and neck, the venous pressure may be less than atmospheric and an injury may let air in. This is one reason why surgeons must be particularly careful when operating on the brain, and why the head of the bed is tilted down when inserting or removing a central venous catheter from the jugular or subclavian veins.

When air enters the veins, it travels to the right side of the heart, and then to the lungs. This can cause the vessels of the lung to constrict, raising the pressure in the right side of the heart. If the pressure rises high enough in a patient who is one of the 20% to 30% of the population with a patent foramen ovale, the gas bubble can then travel to the left side of the heart, and on to the brain or coronary arteries. Such bubbles are responsible for the most serious of gas embolic symptoms.

Venous or pulmonary air embolism occurs when air enters the systemic veins and is transported to the right side of the heart and from there into the pulmonary arteries, where it may lodge, blocking or reducing blood flow. Gas in the venous circulation can cause cardiac problems by obstructing the pulmonary circulation or forming an air-lock which raises central venous pressure and reduces pulmonary and systemic arterial pressures. Experiments on animals show that the amount of gas necessary for this to happen is quite variable. Human case reports suggest that injecting more than 100 mL of air into the venous system at rates greater than 100 mL/s can be fatal. Very large and symptomatic amounts of venous air emboli may also occur in rapid decompression in severe diving or decompression accidents, where they may interfere with circulation in the lungs and result in respiratory distress and hypoxia.

Gas embolism in a systemic artery, termed arterial gas embolism (AGE), is a more serious matter than in a vein, because a gas bubble in an artery may directly stop blood flow to an area fed by the artery. The symptoms of 'AGE' depend on the area of blood flow, and may be those of stroke for a cerebral arterial gas embolism (CAGE) or heart attack if the heart is affected. The amount of arterial gas embolism that causes symptoms depends on location — 2 mL of air in the cerebral circulation can be fatal, while 0.5 mL of air into a coronary artery can cause cardiac arrest.

=== Prevention and screening ===
If a patent foramen ovale (PFO) is suspected, an examination by echocardiography may be performed to diagnose the defect. In this test, very fine bubbles are introduced into a patient's vein by agitating saline in a syringe to produce the bubbles, then injecting them into an arm vein. A few seconds later, these bubbles may be clearly seen in the ultrasound image, as they travel through the patient's right atrium and ventricle. At this time, bubbles may be observed directly crossing a septal defect, or else a patent foramen ovale may be opened temporarily by asking the patient to perform the Valsalva maneuver while the bubbles are crossing through the right heart – an action which will open the foramen flap and show bubbles passing into the left heart. Such bubbles are too small to cause harm in the test, but such a diagnosis may alert the patient to possible problems which may occur from larger bubbles, formed during activities like underwater diving, where bubbles may grow during decompression. A PFO test may be recommended for divers intending to expose themselves to relatively high decompression stress in deep technical diving.

== Diagnosis ==
As a general rule, any diver who has breathed gas under pressure at any depth who surfaces unconscious, loses consciousness soon after surfacing, or displays neurological symptoms within about 10 minutes of surfacing should be assumed to be experiencing arterial gas embolism.

Symptoms of arterial gas embolism may be present but masked by environmental effects such as hypothermia, or pain from other obvious causes. Neurological examination is recommended when there is suspicion of lung overexpansion injury. Symptoms of decompression sickness may be very similar to, and confused with, symptoms of arterial gas embolism, however, treatment is basically the same. Discrimination between gas embolism and decompression sickness may be difficult for injured divers, and both may occur simultaneously. Dive history may eliminate decompression sickness in many cases, and the presence of symptoms of other lung overexpansion injury would raise the probability of gas embolism.

== Treatment ==
A large bubble of air in the heart (as can follow certain traumas in which air freely gains access to large veins) will present with a constant "machinery" murmur. It is important to promptly place the patient in Trendelenburg position (head down) and on their left side (left lateral decubitus position). The Trendelendburg position keeps a left-ventricular air bubble away from the coronary artery ostia (which are near the aortic valve) so that air bubbles do not enter and cause a myocardial infarction by blocking the coronary arteries. Left lateral decubitus positioning helps to trap air in the non-dependent segment of the right ventricle (where it is more likely to remain instead of progressing into the pulmonary artery and occluding it). The left lateral decubitus position also prevents the air from passing through a potentially patent foramen ovale (present in as many as 30% of adults) and entering the left ventricle, from which it could then embolise to distal arteries (potentially causing occlusive symptoms such as stroke).

Administration of high percentage oxygen is recommended for both venous and arterial air embolism. This is intended to counteract ischaemia and accelerate bubble size reduction.

For venous air embolism the Trendelenburg or left lateral positioning of a patient with an air-lock obstruction of the right ventricle may move the air bubble in the ventricle and allow blood flow under the bubble.

Hyperbaric therapy with 100% oxygen is recommended for patients presenting clinical features of arterial air embolism, as it accelerates removal of nitrogen from the bubbles by solution and improves tissue oxygenation. This is recommended particularly for cases of cardiopulmonary or neurological involvement. Early treatment has greatest benefits, but it can be effective as late as 30 hours after the injury.

=== Treatment of divers ===
Oxygen first aid treatment is useful for suspected gas embolism casualties or divers who have made fast ascents or missed decompression stops. Most fully closed-circuit rebreathers can deliver sustained high concentrations of oxygen-rich breathing gas and could be used as an alternative to pure open-circuit oxygen resuscitators. However pure oxygen from an oxygen cylinder through a Non-rebreather mask is the optimal way to deliver oxygen to a decompression illness patient.

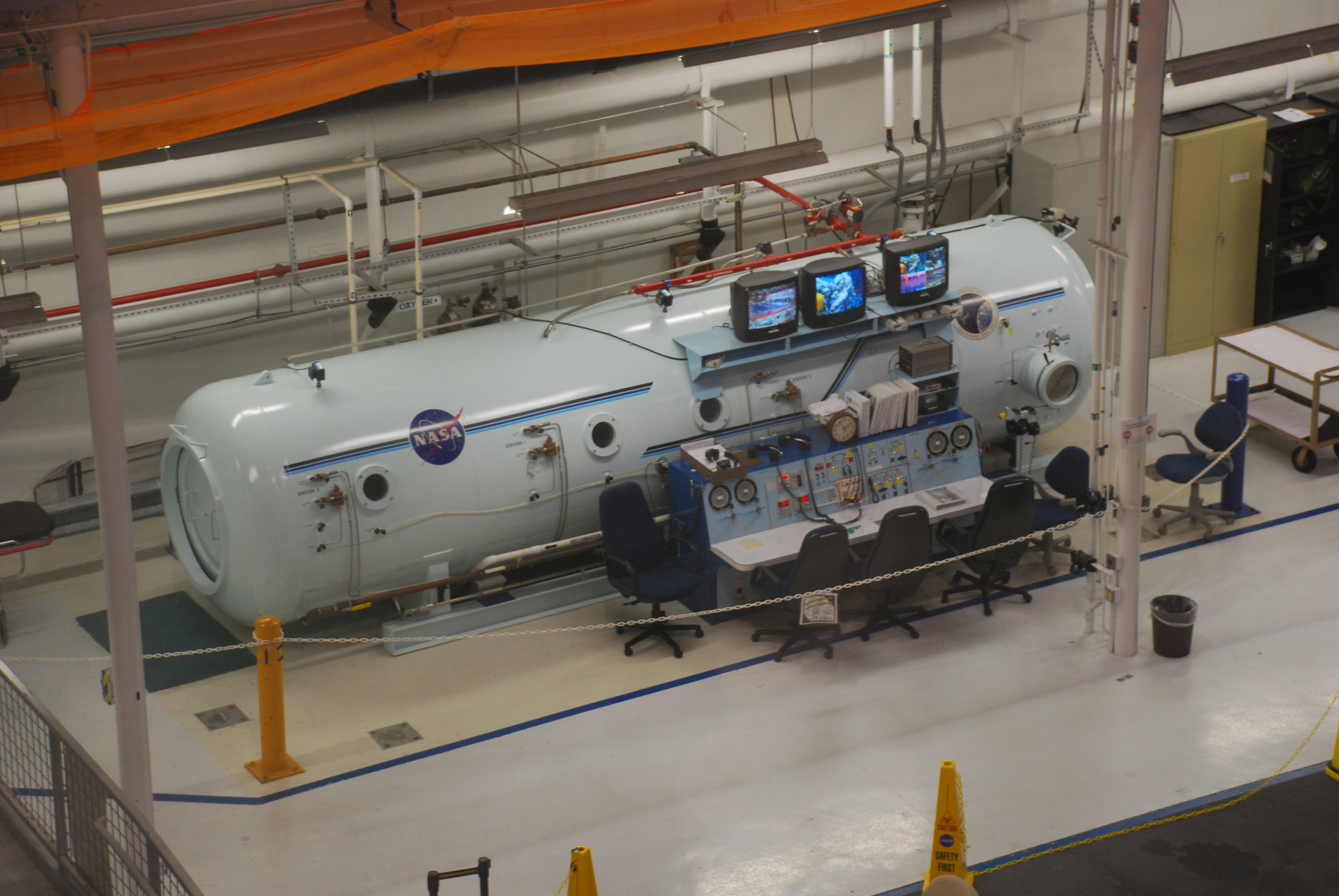
Decompression chamber

Recompression is the most effective, though slow, treatment of gas embolism in divers. Normally this is carried out in a recompression chamber. As pressure increases, the solubility of a gas increases, which reduces bubble size by accelerating absorption of the gas into the surrounding blood and tissues. Additionally, the volumes of the gas bubbles decrease in inverse proportion to the ambient pressure as described by Boyle's law. In the hyperbaric chamber the patient may breathe 100% oxygen, at ambient pressures up to a depth equivalent of 18 msw. Under hyperbaric conditions, oxygen diffuses into the bubbles, displacing the nitrogen from the bubble and into solution in the blood. Oxygen bubbles are more easily tolerated. Diffusion of oxygen into the blood and tissues under hyperbaric conditions supports areas of the body which are deprived of blood flow when arteries are blocked by gas bubbles. This helps to reduce ischemic injury. The effects of hyperbaric oxygen also counteract the damage that can occur with reperfusion of previously ischemic areas; this damage is mediated by leukocytes (a type of white blood cell).

=== Complications ===
High incidence of relapse after hyperbaric oxygen treatment due to delayed cerebral edema.

== Epidemiology ==
In terms of the epidemiology of air embolisms one finds that the intraoperative period to have the highest incidence. For example, VAE (vascular air embolism) in neurological cases ranges up to 80%, and OBGYN surgeries incidence rates range from 11 to 97% for VAE. In divers the incidence rate is 7/100,000 per dive.

== In society and culture ==
Direct injection air embolism was one of the methods used by Belgian murderer Ivo Poppe to kill some of his victims (the other method being valium).

William Davis, formerly a nurse in Texas, was convicted in October 2021 of murdering four and injuring two patients by injecting air into their arterial lines following heart surgery. During opening arguments for sentencing, prosecutors told the court that they would present evidence of an additional three murders and three attempted murders.

Dorothy L. Sayers made use of direct injection air embolism as a murder method in her 1927 Lord Peter Wimsey mystery novel Unnatural Death (published in the US in 1928 as The Dawson Pedigree), although her description was subsequently criticised as implausible on account of the injection site and volume.

Air embolism was the method used by an insane nurse to euthanize seven terminally ill patients in the episode "Amazing Grace" of the TV series Shadow Chasers.

Near the end of young adult novel Catching Fire, as well as its film adaptation, protagonist Katniss Everdeen grabs a syringe and fills it with air, with the intention of killing Peeta Mellark quickly via air embolism.

In Season 2 Episode 7 of Reacher, Jack Reacher and Neagley find Grant alive and hospitalized after their prior attempt to kill him, and after torturing him to extract information about Robert Langston out of him, then kill him by injecting air into him with a syringe and causing an air embolism, in order to exact vengeance for his murder of Gaitano Russo, an honest cop who was allied with Reacher and his team.

== In plants ==
Air embolisms generally occur in the xylem of vascular plants because a fall in hydraulic pressure results in cavitation. Falling hydraulic pressure occurs as a result of water stress or physical damage.

A number of physiological adaptations serve to prevent cavitation and to recover from it. The cavitation may be prevented from spreading by the narrow pores in the walls between vessel elements. The plant xylem sap may be able to detour around the cavitation through interconnections. Water loss may be reduced by closing off leaf stomata to reduce transpiration, or some plants produce positive xylem pressure from the roots. When xylem pressure increases, the cavitation gases may redissolve.

== See also ==
- Ebullism – Formation of vapour bubbles in bodily fluids due to reduced environmental pressure
- Decompression sickness – Disorder caused by dissolved gases forming bubbles in tissues
- Barotrauma – Injury due to pressure difference between gas filled space and adjoining tissue
