= Denny Sanford =

American businessman (1935–2026)

T. Denny Sanford
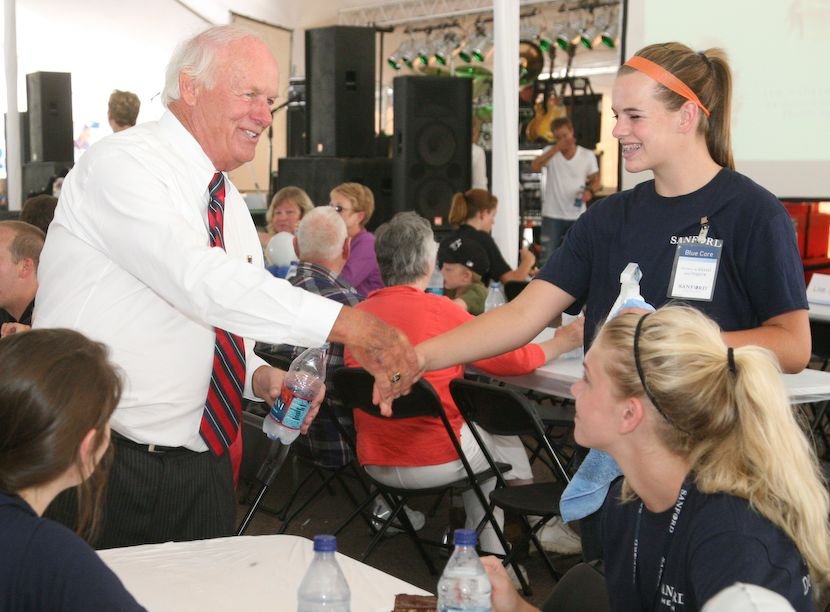
- Sanford (left) in 2010
- Born: Thomas Denny Sanford; December 23, 1935; Saint Paul, Minnesota, U.S.
- Died: July 18, 2026 (aged 90); Sioux Falls, South Dakota, U.S.
- Education: University of Minnesota (BA)
- Occupations: Owner and Founder of First Premier Bank; CEO of United National Corp.
- Spouses: Anne Parsons (m. 1960; div. 1982); Colleen Anderson (m. 1995; div. 2005)
- Children: 2

Thomas Denny Sanford (December 23, 1935 – July 18, 2026) was an American businessman and philanthropist. He was the founder of First Premier Bank and the chairman and chief executive officer of its holding company, United National.

== Background ==
Thomas Denny Sanford was born in Saint Paul, Minnesota, on December 23, 1935, during the Great Depression. His mother died of breast cancer when he was four years old and his father died when he was 20. Soon after graduating from high school, he was arrested for drinking and fighting and sentenced to juvenile detention; he was released early on the condition that he attend the University of Minnesota, from which he graduated in 1958.

Sanford had two sons from his first marriage. In 1987, Sanford met his second wife, Colleen Anderson. They married in 1995 and divorced in 2005.

Sanford died on July 18, 2026, aged 90.

== Career ==
Sanford's mother was an immigrant from Sweden whose family settled in Chicago. His father grew up on a farm in Illinois. His first job, at age eight, was in his father's garment shop. He later became a student at the University of Minnesota, intending to become a doctor, but struggled with chemistry and switched majors, graduating with a degree in psychology in 1958. Sanford made his fortune as the owner of subprime credit card providers First Premier Bank and Premier Bankcard. The bank is known for specializing in a wide range of high-interest, subprime credit cards marketed to people with low credit scores. In 2007, the bank paid $4.5 million as part of a settlement with New York Attorney General Andrew Cuomo that alleged deceptive practices in marketing. Premier Bank offered a credit card with a 79.9% interest rate and a $300 limit, an amount Senator Bernie Sanders cited as an example of "extortion and loan sharking".

In 2018, Forbes ranked Sanford 1,103rd on its "World's Billionaires" list, with a net worth of $2.2 billion. As of July 2026, Forbes estimated his net worth at $2.4 billion.

== Legal issues ==
In 2020, it was reported that Sanford was being investigated for possession of child pornography. Investigators obtained a search warrant before referring the case to the United States Department of Justice. The investigation has led several institutions to reconsider his philanthropy. The investigation was ongoing as of January 2022 at both the state and federal levels; that May, the office of the South Dakota Attorney General announced it had ended the investigation without filing charges. Records unsealed in April 2023 at the request of ProPublica revealed that an AOL email account that investigators linked to Sanford contained photos of nude girls estimated to be between 8 and 15 years old, but that it was established that others had access to the account, including indications that it had been hacked. Sanford's lawyer Stacy Hegge said: "These preliminary allegations were provided to law enforcement prior to law enforcement's exhaustive investigation and its realization that various individuals had documented access to the electronic devices at issue, including signs of hacking. While some claim releasing affidavits that reiterate these allegations constitute transparency, releasing preliminary allegations made prior to completing the full investigation only misinforms people and obscures the investigation's conclusions that no prosecutable offense occurred."

In 2010 Sanford committed to The Giving Pledge to give away much of his fortune. In May 2023, after the unsealing of the aforementioned records, he was removed from the Giving Pledge's list. He could no longer participate in its events.

== Philanthropic gifts ==
Sanford pledged to give away his entire fortune during his lifetime, giving financial contributions to various higher education and healthcare institutions without a formal foundation or permanent staff. In 2006, BusinessWeek magazine listed him as one of the 50 most generous philanthropists. As of March 2026, he had donated nearly $4 billion.

- In 2006, Sanford donated $70 million to The State of South Dakota's Science and Technology Authority to help secure a deep underground science and engineering laboratory at the former site of the Homestake Gold Mine.
- On February 3, 2007, Sanford announced a $400 million gift to Sioux Valley Hospitals and Health System, which renamed itself Sanford Health. The gift was featured on The Chronicle of Philanthropy "Philanthropy 50: Americans Who Gave the Most in 2007."
- In 2009, Sanford made a $6 million donation to help fund the stadium on the University of Minnesota campus. He also gave $100 million to create a breast cancer foundation in memory of his mother. The University of Minnesota accepted a $6 million donation to name the athletic hall of fame within the stadium for Sanford.
- In 2013, Physics Today reported that Sanford gave $70 million to a physics lab in the defunct Homestake Mine in South Dakota, renamed the Sanford Underground Research Facility. The University of California, San Diego, also announced a $100 million gift from Sanford for the creation of the Sanford Stem Cell Clinical Center at UCSD, the second-largest donation in the university's history. Sanford pledged $10 million to the Crazy Horse Memorial in South Dakota following a $10 million matching pledge made by Sanford in 2007.
- In 2014, Sanford gave $125 million to Sanford Health to create the Imagenetics program. He also gave $1 million to National University to create the Sanford Education Center. The National University's School of Education was renamed the Sanford College of Education after the donation. The Denny Sanford PREMIER Center in Sioux Falls, South Dakota, was also named after donations from Sanford.
- In 2018, Sanford founded an endowment within the Horatio Alger Fund of $30 million for college scholarships to students who have faced significant financial or healthcare obstacles in their education. He also donated $30 million toward a remodeling of the San Diego Children's Zoo.
- In 2019, Sanford donated $350 million to National University in addition to $150 million he had given previously. In honor of the donation, National University announced in 2019 that it would change its name on July 1, 2020 to Sanford National University, but the name change was placed on hold after Sanford became the subject of a South Dakota child pornography investigation.
- In 2021, Sanford donated $300 million to medical education and rural healthcare to expand opportunities in graduate medical education and community health and wellness.
- In 2021, Sanford donated $350 million to Sanford Health to create a virtual care center.
- In 2025, Sanford donated $300 million toward development of the Sanford Black Hills Medical Center in Rapid City, South Dakota.

== See also ==
- List of people from South Dakota
- List of University of Minnesota people
