= Sanford USD Medical Center =

Hospital in Sioux Falls, South Dakota, U.S.

Coordinates: 43.535148°N 96.742512°W

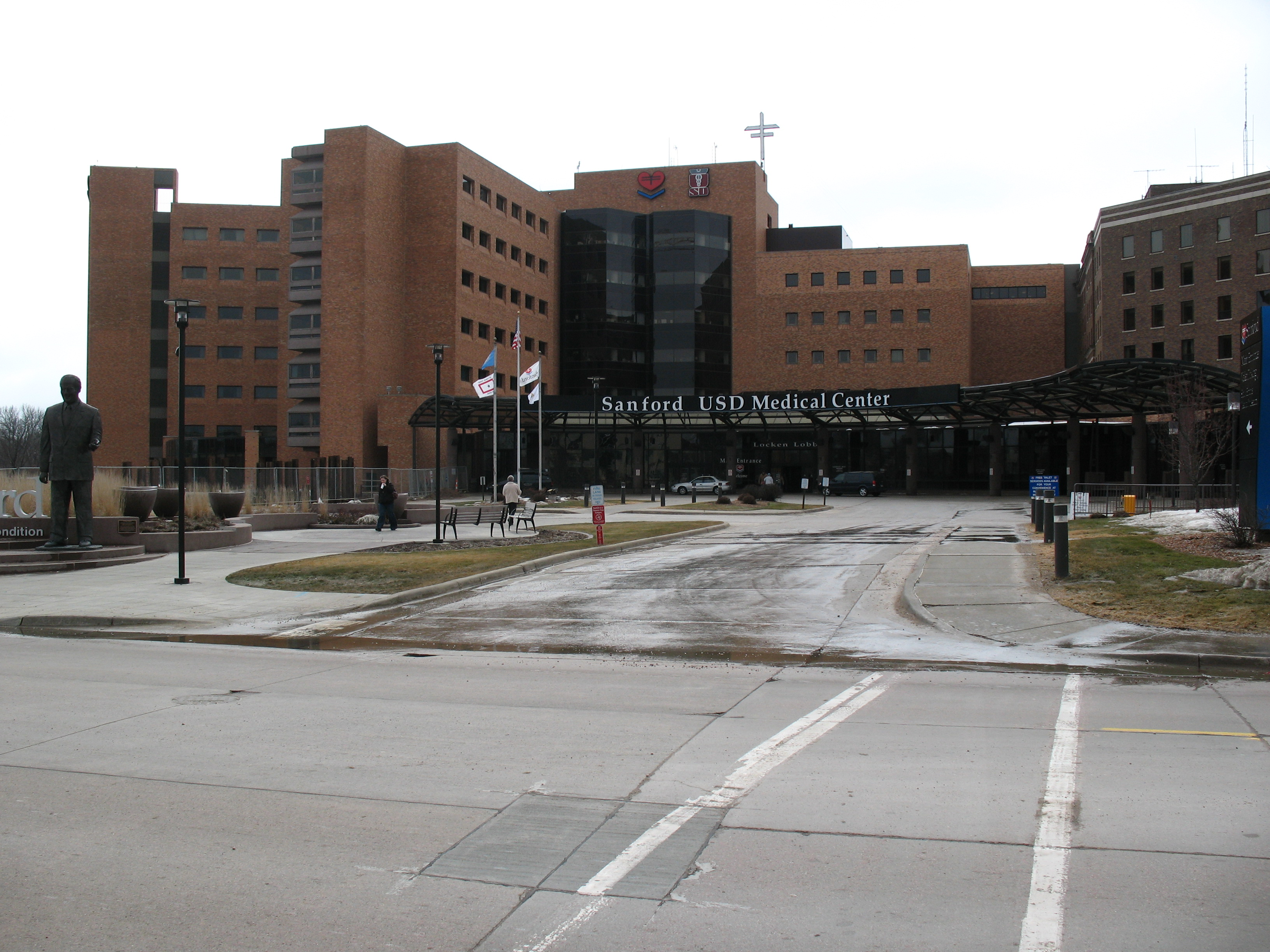
- Sanford USD Medical Center in 2010

Geography
- Location: 1305 W. 18th St., Sioux Falls, South Dakota, U.S.

Organisation
- Type: Teaching hospital
- Affiliated university: University of South Dakota Sanford School of Medicine

Services
- Emergency department: Level I trauma center
- Beds: 545

History
- Opened: 1893

Links
- Website: www.sanfordhealth.org/locations/sanford-usd-medical-center

Sanford USD Medical Center is a hospital in Sioux Falls, South Dakota, United States. It is the largest hospital in South Dakota and serves as a teaching hospital for the University of South Dakota Sanford School of Medicine.

Sanford USD Medical Center has 545 beds and approximately 4,000 employees.

Sanford USD Medical Center is a part of an integrated health care system.

== History ==
Sanford USD Medical Center was formed in 1893 as the Sioux Falls Hospital. Local physicians, clergy and community members began organizing a hospital for the growing city. The Sioux Falls Hospital was located in the Seney House in Sioux Falls, South Dakota, United States. It officially opened In September 1894, becoming the first hospital in Sioux Falls history. The Seney House was named for George I. Seney, a banker, art collector, and benefactor from New York, New York.

The hospital’s origins date to 1893, when Sioux Falls residents began efforts to establish a hospital in the city. Sioux Falls Hospital opened the following year in the Seney House.

In 1898, the hospital moved to the Cameron House at 10th Street and Dakota Avenue. Two years later, it moved to a newly constructed 20-bed hospital at 19th Street and Minnesota Avenue and was renamed Sioux Falls Lutheran Hospital. The building was the first in South Dakota constructed specifically for use as a hospital.

In 1915, a three-story wing was added to the hospital, increasing its capacity to 50 beds.

During World War I, Sioux Falls Lutheran Hospital experienced shortages and increased costs for medicines and other supplies, some of which were diverted to the war effort. During the 1918 influenza pandemic, the hospital experienced overcrowding, with patients housed in hallways, offices and the hospital’s parlor.

In 1925, the Bethany Association and Sioux Falls Hospital Association merged to form the Sioux Valley Hospital Association. The fundraising campaign for a new hospital began in 1927, and construction began in 1929. The project encountered financial difficulties following the stock market crash, but the new six-story hospital opened in 1930.

Construction of a new north wing began in 1942 and was completed in 1944, increasing the hospital’s capacity from 100 to 180 beds.

During a regional polio outbreak in 1948, Sioux Valley Hospital treated nearly 400 patients with the disease. At one point, 103 patients were hospitalized with polio, including 14 who required iron lungs.

In 1964, a new three-story west wing opened to accommodate the hospital’s growing patient population.

In 1976, Sioux Valley Hospital began its Intensive Air medical transport service. The Sioux Valley Heart Center opened in 1990.

In 1999, the hospital was renamed Sioux Valley Hospital USD Medical Center, reflecting its role as the primary teaching hospital for the University of South Dakota School of Medicine.

In 2007, T. Denny Sanford donated $400 million to Sioux Valley Hospitals and Health System, which was subsequently renamed Sanford Health in his honor.

In 2012, the Sanford Heart Hospital opened on the medical center campus, expanding its cardiovascular services.

== Teaching and education ==
Sanford USD Medical Center serves as a teaching hospital for the University of South Dakota Sanford School of Medicine, providing clinical training opportunities for medical students, residents and fellows.

The Sanford School of Medicine also operates graduate medical education programs in Sioux Falls, including residency and fellowship training in a variety of medical specialties.

== Facilities ==
Sanford Children's Hospital

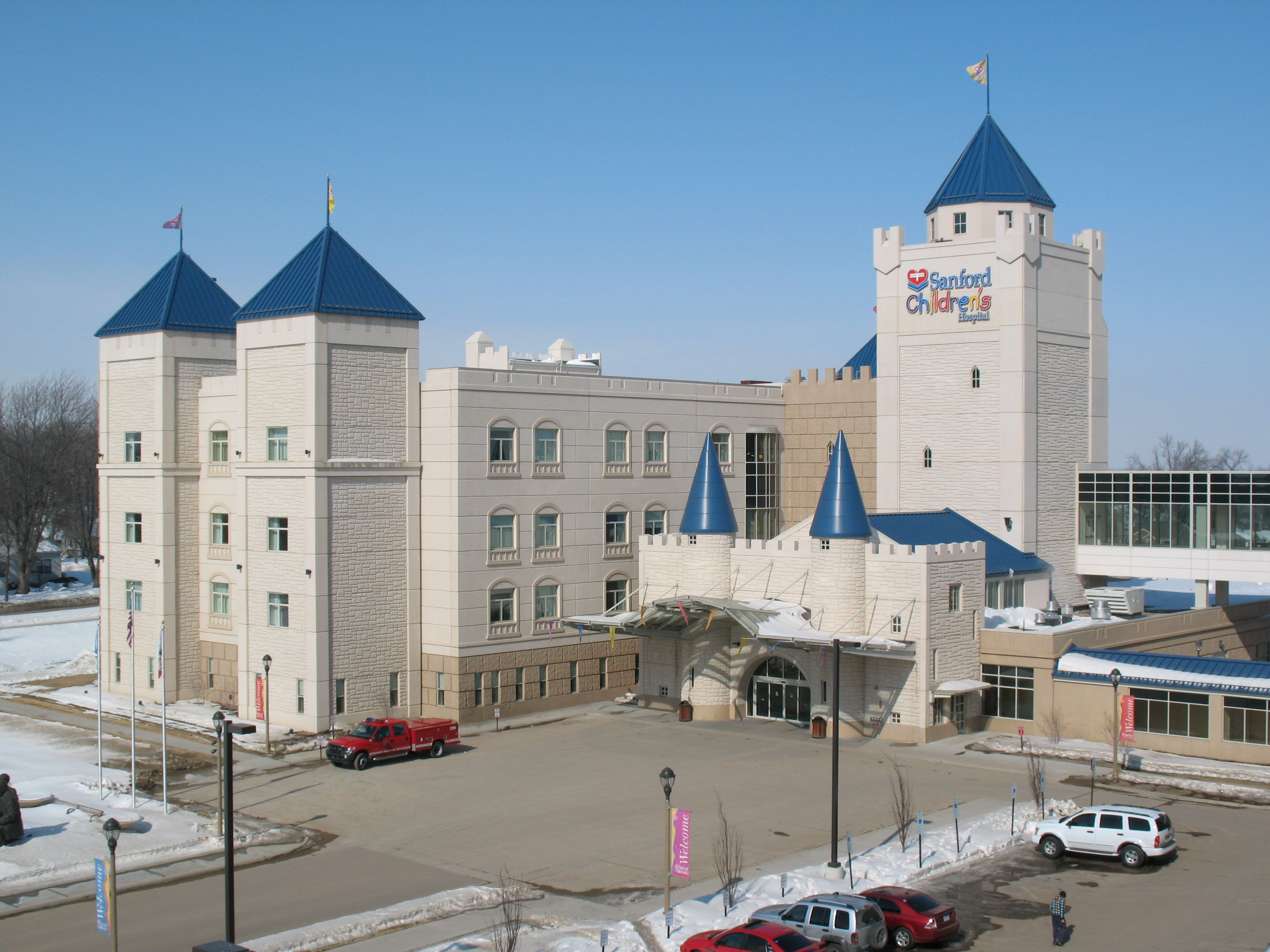
- Sanford Children's Hospital in 2010

Geography
- Location: 1600 W 22nd St., Sioux Falls, South Dakota, U.S.

Organisation
- Type: Teaching hospital
- Affiliated university: University of South Dakota Sanford School of Medicine
- Network: Sanford Health

Services
- Emergency department: Level II Pediatric Trauma Center

History
- Founded: 2009

Links
- Website: www.sanfordhealth.org/locations/sanford-childrens-hospital-sioux-falls

=== Sanford Children’s Hospital ===
Opened on the Sanford USD Medical Center campus in 2009. The hospital provides pediatric inpatient and intensive care services, including a Level IV neonatal intensive care unit.

=== Sanford Heart Hospital ===
Directly connected to Sanford USD Medical Center and provides cardiovascular care, including diagnostic testing, cardiac and vascular surgery, catheterization and cardiac rehabilitation.

=== Sanford Cancer Center ===
Provides cancer and hematology care and has served as a regional referral center since 1982. Its services include medical oncology, hematology and radiation oncology.

=== Sanford Orthopedic Hospital ===
Sanford Orthopedic Hospital opened on the Sanford USD Medical Center campus in January 2026. The 161,000-square-foot facility includes 12 operating rooms, 35 pre- and postoperative rooms, imaging services and rehabilitation space.

=== Edith Sanford Breast Center ===
The Edith Sanford Breast Center opened on the Sanford USD Medical Center campus in 2016. The center provides breast cancer screening, diagnosis and treatment and includes breast imaging, genetic counseling and high-risk breast services.

== Trauma and emergency care ==
Sanford USD Medical Center is the only Level I Adult Trauma Center in South Dakota verified by the American College of Surgeons. The medical center also operates a Level II Pediatric Trauma Center.
