= Isar Klinikum =

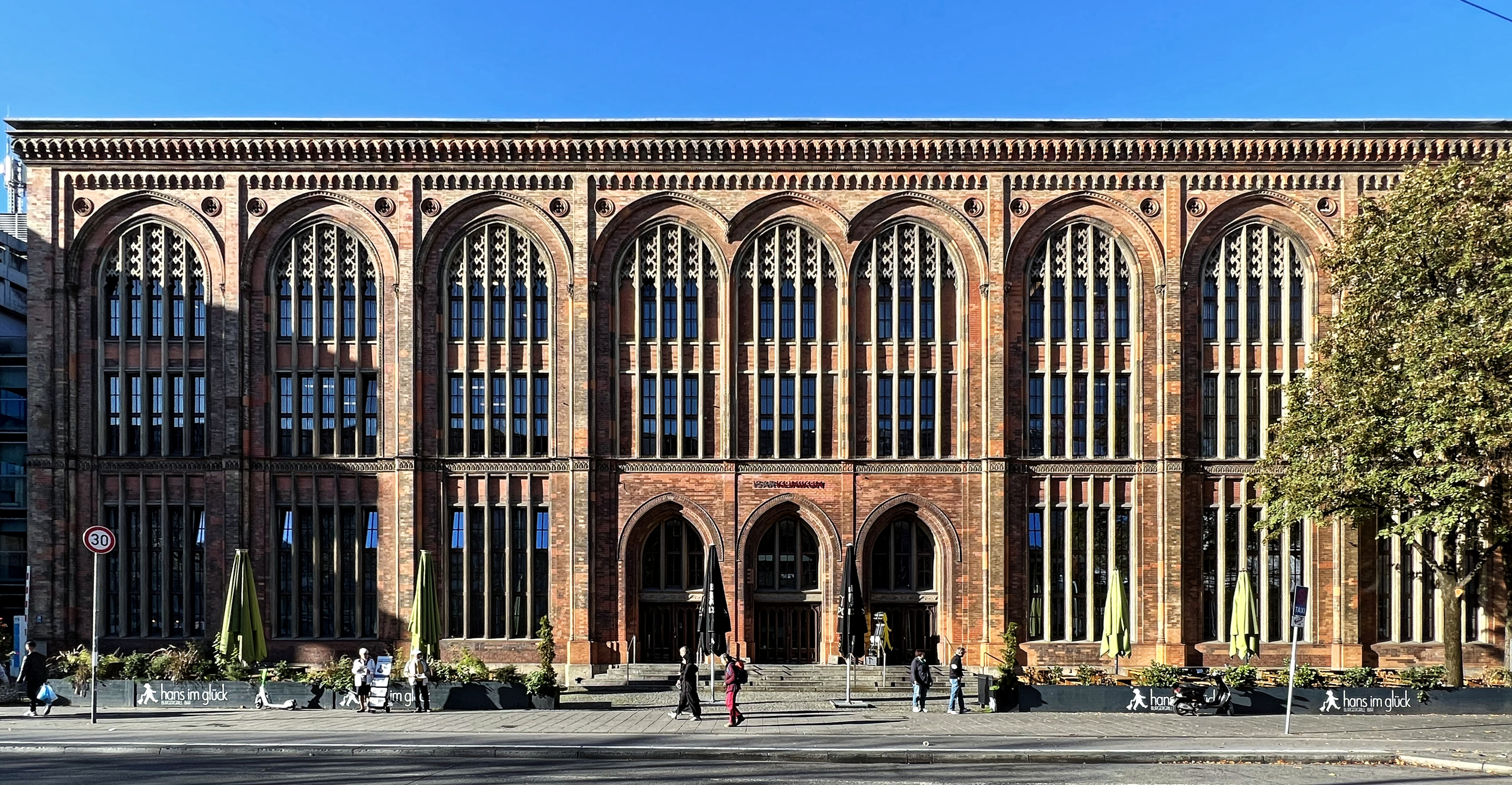

Geography
- Location: Munich, Bavaria, Germany
- Coordinates: 48°08′06″N 11°33′54″E

Organisation
- Care system: Private
- Type: Specialist

Services
- Beds: 250
- Speciality: Multi-Speciality

History
- Founded: 2008

Links
- Website: isarklinikum.de

The Isar Klinikum (Own Spelling: ISAR Klinikum) was founded by Eckhard Alt in 2008 and is located on the Munich Altstadtring.

== History ==
The Isar Klinikum was founded 2008 with the name Isar Medizin Zentrum, a name that was used until April 2014. Part of the building that makes up the Isar Klinikum, namely the historical Bürkleinbau is protected cultural heritage. This building was built in the 19th century and was used as a lying-in-hospital. Today is houses the various medical practices inside the Isar Klinikum. The growth of the Isar Klinikum has grown rapidly since its beginnings, consisting today of 12 speciality clinics including a number of additional clinics. Since 2008 over 88,000 private and publicly-insured patients have been treated in the Isar Klinikum.

== Certification ==
Healthcare services provided at the Isar Klinikum are in accordance to and certified by DIN EN ISO 9001:2015. This norm places emphasis on clinical processes, patient safety and risk management. The Isar Klinikum is a member of the alliance Operation Clean Hands (German: "Aktion Saubere Hände") and was distinguished for its performance by the German health insurance schemes.

== Management ==
The chairman of the supervisory board of the Isar Klinikum is its founder Eckhard Alt. In addition to the chairman, the Isar Klinikum is headed by the Medical Directorate consisting of doctors Hartwig Bauer, Christoph Bernheim and Ralf Rothörl. The commercial management of the Isar Klinikum is headed by Andreas Arbogast since 2010.
