= First Premier Bank =

American banking company

- Type: Private
- Industry: Banking
- Founded: 1986; 40 years ago
- Founder: Thomas Denny Sanford
- Headquarters: Sioux Falls, South Dakota
- Key people: Miles Beacom (CEO - Bankcard); Dana Dykhouse (CEO - Bank); Dave Rozenboom (president - Bank)
- Revenue: US$ 87.65 million (2016)
- Net income: US$ 24.95 million (2016)
- Total assets: US$ 3 billion (2023)
- Number of employees: 2,300
- Parent: United National Corporation
- Website: firstpremier.com

First Premier Bank is an American issuer of MasterCard brand credit cards in the United States and is headquartered in Sioux Falls, South Dakota, United States. The bank is known for specializing in a wide range of subprime credit cards that are marketed to individuals with low credit scores.

== History ==
The bank was founded in 1986 and was owned and controlled by T. Denny Sanford until his death in 2026.

In 2007, the bank settled a case with the New York Attorney General, who claimed that the bank used deceptive practices to market its credit cards. As part of the settlement, the bank paid $4.5 million. In 2014, it was announced that First Premier Bank had filed a lawsuit against cardhub.com for allowing customers to view rates and terms, as well as for enabling users to review the card. However, the lawsuit was dropped a few months later.

== Business model ==
The typical First Premier Bank MasterCard user uses the card for about 18 months before transitioning to another card with better terms. Sanford described the company as providing a "lifeline" for those with poor credit.

== Criticisms ==
As of December 2010, First Premier Bank was reportedly offering a credit card with a 79.9% interest rate and a $300 limit. This was cited by Senator Bernie Sanders as an example of what he called "extortion and loan sharking".

First Premier Bank's CEO, Dana J. Dykhouse, was referenced in a 2014 piece in the Argus Leader as belonging to a group of would-be local benefactors who the author wrote, "should quit gouging poor people who can't make it from paycheck to paycheck, or don't qualify for regular credit cards. ... Loan sharks who charge an obscene profit just because they can don't make good community leaders."

== Awards ==
- Two 2023 Gold Stevie Awards: Contact Center of the Year and Front-Line Customer Service Team of the Year.
- Bronze 2023 Stevie for Customer Service Management Team of the Year.
- Best Banks to Work For – American Banker Magazine 2015, 2016, 2017, 2018, 2019, 2020, 2021, 2022, 2024, 2025

== See also ==
- First National Bank of Norden
