= Niels Högel =

German serial killer and former nurse (born 1976)

- Born: Niels Högel; 30 December 1976 (age 49); Wilhelmshaven, Lower Saxony, West Germany
- Status: Incarcerated
- Conviction: Murder (85 counts)
- Penalty: Life imprisonment

Details
- Victims: 85–300
- Span of crimes: 2000–2005
- Country: Germany
- State: Lower Saxony

Niels Högel (born 30 December 1976) is a German serial killer and former nurse who was sentenced to life imprisonment, initially for the murders of six patients, and later convicted of a total of eighty-five murders. Estimates of Högel's alleged victim count have increased since his first conviction; as of 2020, he was believed to have claimed 300 victims in just over five years, making him the most prolific serial killer in the history of peacetime Germany, and possibly the world.

== Early life and education ==
Niels Högel was born in the coastal town of Wilhelmshaven, Lower Saxony, in West Germany. His father worked as a nurse at the Sankt-Willehad-Hospital in Wilhelmshaven. His mother worked as a paralegal; he has an older sister. According to Högel, he had a sheltered or "protected" childhood and was not exposed to violence at home. His grandmother also worked as a nurse.

== Career ==
After completing his vocational training in 1997 at the Sankt-Willehad Hospital, Högel became a nurse and continued working there.

=== Oldenburg Clinic, 1999-2002 ===
From 1999 onwards, Högel was employed at the Oldenburg Clinic, stationed in its cardiac surgery intensive care unit, Ward 211. In August 2001, doctors and medical orderlies at the hospital held a meeting, which Högel attended, discussing an unusual spike in both resuscitations and deaths during the preceding months. Fifty-eight percent of these incidents were found to have occurred while Högel was on duty. After the meeting, Högel called in sick for the duration of three weeks; during that time, only two patients in Ward 211 had died, significantly fewer than had prior to his sick leave. Years later, after having been apprehended by police, Högel admitted that, at the time of the meeting, he had thought he had been found out.

Under pressure by Ward 211's head physician, Högel was transferred to the anaesthesiology ward in 2001. Soon the anaesthesiology ward's head physician became suspicious of how Högel was frequently present in emergency situations. In September 2002, the Oldenburg Clinic's head physician confronted Högel after multiple patients under his care had been found in life-threatening conditions for seemingly inexplicable reasons. It was suggested that he either resign his position at the Clinic and continue to receive full wages for another three months or transfer to the Clinic's logistics unit where he would assist in moving patients throughout the hospital.

On 10 October 2002, Högel received a reference letter issued by the Oldenburg Clinic's director of nursing. Therein, she testified to Högel's "circumspect, diligent and autonomous" work ethic, as well as to him having acted "prudently and in an objectively correct manner in critical situations". She also praised his "devotedness" and "cooperative conduct". The letter concluded with an overall assessment of Högel having completed assigned tasks "to the utmost satisfaction".

=== Delmenhorst Clinic, 2002-2005 ===
In December 2002, Högel transferred to the Delmenhorst Clinic, where emergencies and fatalities, mostly due to arrhythmia or sudden decreases in blood pressure, began spiking whilst Högel was on duty. This led to some of Högel's coworkers distancing themselves from him. In later court proceedings, it was reported that Högel had initially been held in high regard in Delmenhorst until suspicions against him began to arise. His superiors allegedly did not act on these suspicions, even when four empty vials of gilurytmal (ajmaline) surfaced in Högel's ward, in spite of no doctor having prescribed any such medication at the time.

On 22 June 2005, colleagues caught Högel intentionally manipulating a patient's syringe pump to improperly administer ajmaline. He was arrested in the summer of 2005.

== Personal life ==
Högel married in 2004. In July 2004, his daughter was born. To "sustain this euphoria, this feeling of happiness" he admitted later to have injected a severely ill intensive care patient with a toxic agent during his first night on duty after her birth. Högel had a history of alcohol abuse and analgesic abuse.

In a 2019 forensic psychiatric evaluation he has been described as having a combined personality disorder, being narcissistic, antisocial and compulsive. He had a strong need for recognition, up to being histrionic, a desire for excitement, thrill, and action, and a remarkable lack of empathy. He lacked feelings of guilt, shame, and remorse, and the chances of successful therapy were "very, very low".

== Investigation and convictions 2006 and 2008 ==
The June 2005 incident prompted Delmenhorst police to open an investigation into Högel. Multiple coworkers of Högel at Delmenhorst came forward to voice their suspicions that he was behind numerous complications, resuscitations and unexplained deaths at their hospital. The extensive police investigation that followed these allegations examined all deaths at the hospital between 2003 and 2005, revealing that the number of deaths at the Delmenhorst Clinic had doubled during Högel's employment there. In 2005, 73% of deaths could be connected to Högel's work schedule.(subscription required)

These findings were subsequently forwarded to the Oldenburg district attorney's office. In December 2006, adjudicating the 22 June 2005 incident, the Landgericht Oldenburg (German regional court) sentenced Högel to five years in prison and an employment ban of equal length for attempted voluntary manslaughter. A joint plaintiff appealed the verdict and a higher court subsequently reversed it. In June 2008, Högel was then given a seven-and-a-half-year prison sentence as well as a life-long employment ban.

== 2015 trial and confession ==
From January 2014 onward, the Oldenburg district attorney's office initiated another investigation into the incidents at the Delmenhorst Clinic. In September 2014, Högel was charged with three counts of murder and two counts of attempted murder. After confessing to the charges, Högel stated he had committed thirty additional murders. The patients' deaths were caused by Högel's administering ninety unauthorized injections; sixty patients were successfully resuscitated. On 28 February 2015, the Landgericht Oldenburg sentenced Högel to life in prison. The sentence became final in March 2015.

In 2014, prosecutors claimed Högel acted out of boredom and the desire to show off his resuscitation skills.

== Further investigations, 2014-2017 ==
Amidst mounting suspicion that Högel might be responsible for further deaths, police launched a major investigation in October 2014, after which 200 suspicious deaths were identified. From November 2014 onward, the special commission "Kardio" examined further deaths during Högel's tenure as a nurse at various places of employment.

During the three-year investigation, more than 200 cases were reevaluated. A total of 134 bodies in Germany, Poland and Turkey were exhumed and autopsied. which were distributed across 67 different cemeteries. In many cases decomposition had progressed too far to be able to detect any traces of medication. 101 patients from Delmenhorst, who died during Högel's tenure, could not be autopsied, as their remains had been cremated. In 2015, suspected victims were exhumed in Ganderkesee and Delmenhorst. The bodies' autopsies revealed traces of heart medication.

In November 2016, authorities said they were able to prove 37 homicides attributed to Högel in Delmenhorst between December 2002 and June 2005. According to an August 2017 statement by the director of the special commission "Kardio", the "provable Oldenburg and Delmenhorst homicides [...] were only the tip of the iceberg". As Högel had been sentenced to life in prison without eligibility for parole at the time, further court cases would not alter Högel's sentence, but either find him innocent or guilty of further charges. As capital punishment is constitutionally prohibited in Germany, Högel's prior conviction had already entailed the maximum punishment of life without parole.

On 28 August 2017, police announced they had concluded that Högel was responsible for the deaths of at least 90 patients, including six for which he had already been convicted. Högel admitted to an undisclosed number of deaths but in most cases was unable to remember specific details, although he did not deny possibly being responsible. In November 2017, the total number of victims attributed to Högel was revised and increased to 106, with some suspicious deaths still under investigation. In January 2018, German prosecutors charged Högel with the murder of 97 patients and announced their intention to file charges against other hospital staff who failed to act. Prosecutors again claimed Högel wanted to impress colleagues by reviving the patients he had previously attacked.

The police reported that Högel had made use of multiple drugs, including ajmaline, sotalol, lidocaine, amiodarone and calcium chloride. Excessive doses of these drugs can cause cardiac arrhythmia and severe drops in blood pressure, which can lead to rapid physiological deterioration in patients already unwell.

== 2018-2019 trial, life sentence and appeal ==
In January 2018, the Oldenburg state's attorney's office pressed charges against Högel, accusing him of having murdered 100 patients between 7 February 2000 and 24 June 2005 (four separate charges that were jointly tried). The deceased were aged between 34 and 96 years.

On 7 March 2018, the Oldenburg labour court sentenced Högel to pay 47,000 Euro in compensation, for two medical opinions and various lawyers' fees.

On 30 October 2018, the main trial at Landgericht Oldenburg commenced in the Weser-Ems-Hallen ballrooms, due to the high number of people involved in the trial with 120 joint plaintiffs.

The 2018-2019 court proceedings spanned a total of 24 days. Out of the 100 murder charges, Högel confessed to 43 on the first day of trial, stated he could not recall 52 and denied his involvement in the five remaining deaths.

=== Witness and expert testimonies ===
Out of the thirty-two witnesses present at the trial, eight testified under oath. Three testimonies were heard in camera. Four medical experts presented the court with detailed information on the courses of the patients' diseases as well as the effects of the medication administered by Högel. A forensic expert in testimony psychology, examined the truthfulness of Högel's testimony. He concluded that Högel, although in principle both capable and willing to lie or provide false testimony, had provided the court with truthful confessions. Staller saw no indications for a false confession.

=== End of evidentiary hearing and final charges ===
The state's attorney's office moved for convictions in 97 and acquittals in three cases. The defence saw the state of evidence to be too insufficient to convict in far more instances and moved for acquittals in 31, murder convictions in 55 and attempted murder convictions in 14 cases.

=== Sentencing and appeal ===
On 6 June 2019, the court in Oldenburg sentenced Högel to life imprisonment. Taking prior convictions into account, the court determined Högel's "severe gravity of guilt", a German legal term which significantly increases the respective sentence's severity and precludes a chance of early release after serving a minimum of 15 years. He was found guilty on 85 separate murder charges and not guilty on 15 further murder charges. The court described Högel's motive, to emerge as a hero after a potential reanimation, as "base" ("niedriger Beweggrund"), which is a precondition for a murder conviction in Germany.

Högel and a joint plaintiff appealed the verdict, which became final on 11 September 2020, when the Federal Court of Justice dismissed both appeals.

=== Media and public access ===
A total of 80 seats were provided to media representatives and an additional 118 seats for the general public. Contrary to prior trials under high public and media attention, public interest did not decline but rose as the trial progressed. On the first day of the trial, numerous seats had remained empty. The number of attendees increased significantly throughout the trial, peaking at approximately 190 spectators and 25 media representatives.

=== Prospective further trials ===
The court decided that a further pending indictment against four employees of the Delmenhorst Clinic would be tried once Högel's verdict was final. Only then would he be obligated to testify at the trial against those employees, because until he had received a final verdict he still had the right to refuse testimony, and he had stated that he wished to exert that right.

== Aftermath, criticism and legislative changes ==
=== Scrutinizing investigatory vigour, 2015 ===
Following Högel's conviction in April 2015, the Osnabrück state's attorney's office pressed obstruction of justice charges against a former Oldenburg chief prosecutor. He had allegedly not acted on conclusive evidence incriminating Högel, thereby protracting investigations. The district court dismissed the case. The Oldenburg state's attorney's office's official objection to the court's decision to dismiss was subsequently finally dismissed by the Oberlandesgericht Oldenburg at a higher judicial level.

=== Affected clinics react, 2015 ===
After the 2015 sentence became valid, both the Delmenhorst Clinic (now Josef-Hospital Delmenhorst) and the Oldenburg Clinic stated their intention to compensate the victims' relatives. In July 2015, both clinics announced plans to become the first clinics in Germany to introduce a process termed 'qualified necropsy', involving an additional coroner. The introduction of this two-man-rule aims at preventing unnatural causes of death owing to criminal actions going unnoticed.

=== Prosecution of former supervisors, 2022 ===
A trial against seven former supervisors of Högel commenced in February 2022 in Oldenburg. According to the prosecution, the accused suspected Högel's involvement in the patient's deaths but neglected to take action, in order to protect the reputation of their hospitals. They were acquitted in September 2022 after both prosecution and defense moved for such verdict.

== See also ==
- List of serial killers by number of victims
- List of German serial killers
