= WalletHub =

Personal finance company

- Type: Private
- Industry: Personal finance, Fintech
- Founded: August 5, 2013; 13 years ago
- Headquarters: Miami, U.S.
- Number of employees: 110
- Website: www.wallethub.com

WalletHub (formerly CardHub.com) is a personal finance company that launched in August 2013. It is based in Miami and owned by Evolution Finance, Inc.

WalletHub offers free consumer tools, such as its WalletLiteracy Quiz and its Financial Fitness Tool, which provides users with credit reports, scores and monitoring. WalletHub also has tools for comparing credit cards, personal loans, car insurance and bank accounts, and it has grown to be one of the best budgeting apps on the market.

== Founder ==
The company's founder, Odysseas Papadimitriou, was born in the city of Athens, Greece, and emigrated from Greece to the United States for college. He then obtained a job in the banking industry and an MBA.

== History ==
WalletHub initially positioned itself as a "personal finance social network" with a focus on reviews for financial advisors, and later expanded to add financial management tools.

On April 10, 2014, First Premier Bank, Premier Bankcard, and Premier Nevada filed suit in the United States District Court for the District of South Dakota against Evolution Finance, Inc. as well as Odysseas Papdimitriou personally. They alleged unfair competition under the Lanham Act as well as breach of contract. On January 7, 2015, the court denied the plaintiffs' motion for a preliminary injunction.

In February 2015, Major League Baseball filed a trademark dispute claiming that WalletHub's logo resembled the logos of the Washington Nationals and the Chicago Cubs too closely. Major League Baseball ended the dispute in August 2015 after WalletHub amended its trademark registration to explicitly exclude baseball and softball from the trademark's scope.

In August 2025, WalletHub removed 40,000 pages of content from search engines to prevent AI theft of copyrighted materials. Users must log in to see this content.

WalletHub lists US cities with population of over 200,000, based on the recent US Census data instead of all US cities and Census-designated places.

== Products and services ==
WalletHub provides financial product comparison tools for credit cards, car insurance, and bank accounts. The company also produces a wide range of research reports, including a quarterly credit card debt report and reports comparing cities and states in financially relevant categories. In addition, WalletHub offers free credit scores, reports, and monitoring through a partnership with TransUnion.

In November 2023, the company launched WalletHub Premium, which provides additional features such as budgeting and expense tracking tools, identity protection, a subscription manager and investment tracking. This added a paid tier to WalletHub's services, which were previously free.
