= Sydney Aistrup =

English footballer (1909–1996)

Personal information
- Full name: Sydney Roy Aistrup
- Date of birth: 7 May 1909
- Place of birth: Sheffield, England
- Date of death: 1996 (aged 86–87)
- Position: Forward

Senior career*
Years	Team	Apps	(Gls)
1928	Halifax Town	2	(0)
- * Club domestic league appearances and goals

Sydney Roy Aistrup (7 May 1909 – 1996) was a footballer who played in The Football League for Halifax Town. He was born in Sheffield, England.
