= University of South Dakota Sanford School of Medicine =

American multi-campus public medical school

Coordinates: 42.782171°N 96.928489°W

- Type: Medical school
- Established: 1907; 1977; Graduated first class
- Location: South Dakota, U.S.
- Website: www.usd.edu/medicine

The University of South Dakota Sanford School of Medicine is the medical school of the University of South Dakota. It offers the Doctor of Medicine, master's and PhD degrees in biomedical sciences, and an MD–PhD. The dean of the school is Dr. Tim Ridgway.

The school has four campuses (Vermillion, Sioux Falls, Rapid City, and Yankton) and several additional farm- and rural-focused sites through its Frontier And Rural Medicine (FARM) program. The FARM sites are in Milbank, Mobridge, Parkston, Platte, Winner, Pierre, Spearfish, and Vermillion.

In 2016, 71 students were accepted of 859 applicants. More than most medical schools, Sanford School of Medicine recruits students from and trains doctors for rural locations.

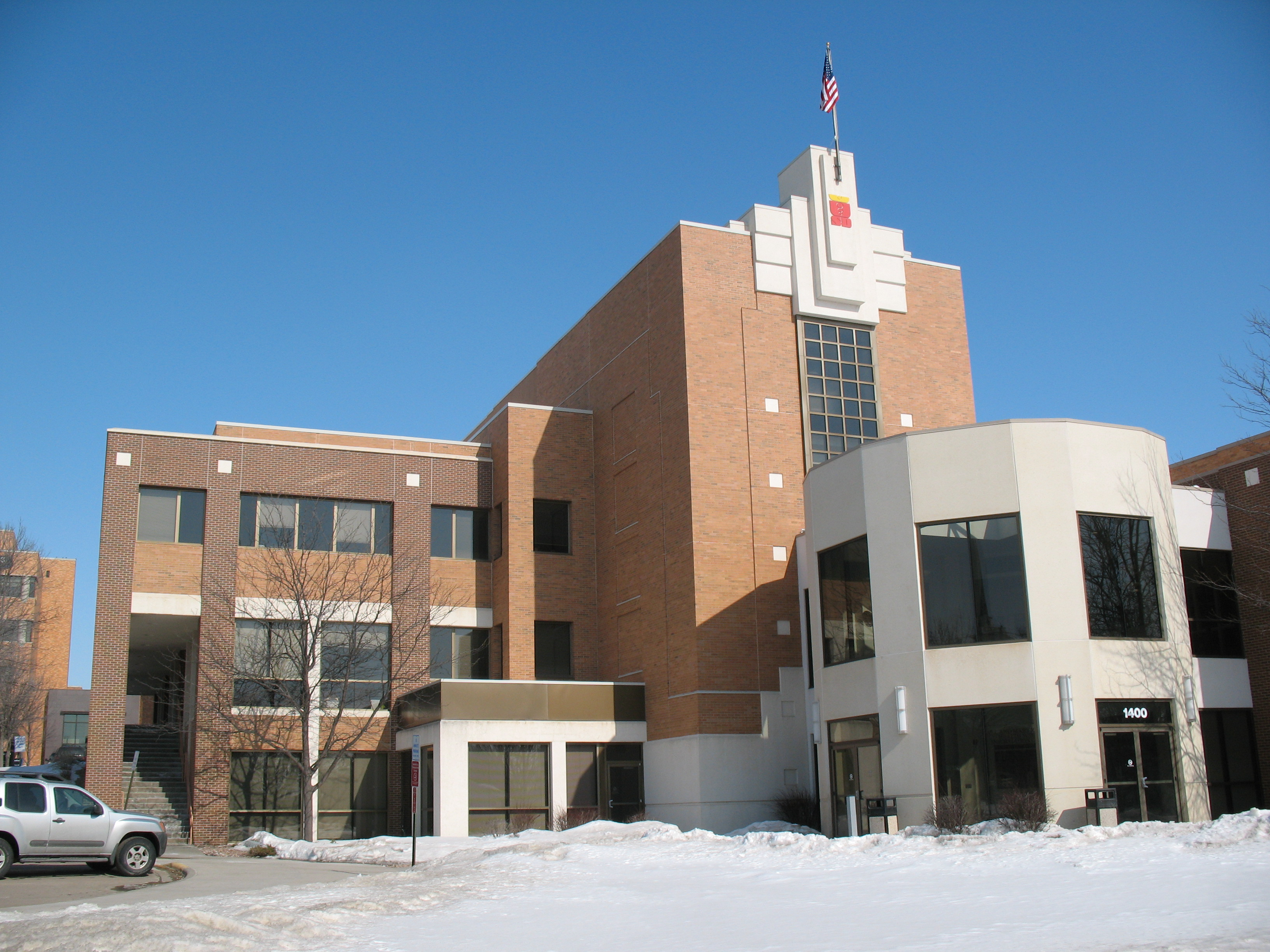
The Sanford School of Medicine health sciences library in Sioux Falls, SD.
