= William George Davis =

American serial killer

- Born: February 3, 1984 (age 42); Longview, Texas, U.S.
- Occupation: Nurse
- Conviction: Capital murder
- Penalty: Death

Details
- Victims: 4–7 killed; 5 attempted
- Span of crimes: June 2017 – January 2018
- Location: Tyler, Texas

William George Davis (born February 3, 1984) is an American serial killer and former nurse. He was convicted of capital murder for killing four patients with air injections after they received heart surgery at Christus Trinity Mother Frances Hospital in Tyler, Texas. Prosecutors claimed that Davis had at least 11 victims in total, of whom seven died. Charges were only brought against Davis for four deaths due to the difficulty in proving the others.

== Murders, arrest, and trial ==
From 2017 to 2018, multiple patients experienced unexplained complications after heart surgeries while in recovery. Davis was discovered after doctors observed air in the brains of patients on CT scans. Security footage was also captured of Davis in the patients' rooms just before complications started. Davis was fired from his job as a nurse at the hospital a month before he was arrested in April 2018. Davis pleaded not guilty to the charges. His defense attorney claimed that Davis was a scapegoat because he was there at the time of the deaths. On October 19, 2021, Davis was convicted of capital murder by a Smith County jury. Prosecutors pushed for the death penalty and played a recording of a call from Davis in jail to his ex-wife in which he claimed that he wanted to lengthen the patients' time in the intensive care unit so that he could earn more overtime. The prosecution rejected the claim that the deaths were accidental. They also said Davis had "enjoyed" carrying out the murders and "liked to kill people."

On October 27, 2021, Davis was sentenced to death after about two hours of jury deliberation. The sentence was automatically appealed.

== Victims ==
Davis was convicted of killing John Lafferty, Ronald Clark, Christopher Greenaway, and Joseph Kalina. The first three were killed in 2017, whereas Kalina was attacked in 2018 and died two years later. In his sentencing, he was also accused of killing Perry Frank, James Blanks, and James Sanders, as well as injuring five other patients. In a 2022 prison interview for a true crime docuseries, Davis also confessed to an additional murder of a 96-year-old woman in 2016.

== See also ==
- Capital punishment in Texas
- List of death row inmates in the United States § Texas
- List of serial killers in the United States
