= Director of nursing (long-term care facility) =

Medical profession

A director of nursing (DON) is a registered nurse who supervises the care of all the patients at a health care facility. The director of nursing has special training beyond the training of a staff nurse for the position that pertains to health care management, and in some places, a director of nursing must hold a special license in order to be employed in that capacity.

The director of nursing is one of the seven directors at a typical health care facility. The other are the directors of food (or dietary) services, social work, activities, business management, housekeeping/laundry, and maintenance. In most facilities, the director of nursing is only second to the facility's administrator, and will fill in during the administrator's absence.

In some facilities, there is also an assistant director of nursing (ADON) who backs up the director of nursing, especially in the DON's absence or off-hours.

The director of nursing is the one who is responsible for communicating between the nursing staff and the physicians at a health care facility. It is the director of nursing who communicates to physicians the needs of the patients.

The director of nursing has the duty of testifying in any criminal or civil legal cases that arise out of the nursing care at the facility and can be held legally liable in the event that his/her own negligence in practice was responsible for a mishap at a facility resulting in death or personal injury to a patient.

== Related laws ==
=== United States ===
In the United States, federal OBRA regulations set the requirements for directors of nursing.

The director of nursing is a full-time position. Either one person can work in this position for 35 hours in a week, or two or more registered nurses can fulfill the duties for a combined 40 hours in a week.

== Duties ==
The duties of a director of nursing may be as follows:

- Development and implementation of nursing policy and procedure. These must be aimed at preventing accidents at the facility.
- Overseeing the hiring and continued employment of nursing staff
- Ensuring there is adequate nursing staff, and that the staff's skills remain current
- Communicating the needs of the residents of the facility to the physicians
- Overseeing nursing employee conduct
- Being a witness at a trial in the event of litigation
- Being knowledgeable of incidents at the facility
- Assessing the health needs of each resident
