= Christina Aistrup Hansen =

Danish nurse and criminal (born 1984)

- Born: 13 August 1984 (age 42); Denmark
- Conviction: Attempted manslaughter
- Penalty: 12 years in prison

Details
- Victims: 4 confirmed
- Country: Denmark

Christina Aistrup Hansen (born 13 August 1984) is a former Danish nurse who was convicted of the attempted murder of four patients at the Nykøbing Falster Hospital.

== Trial and sentence ==
In June 2016, she was convicted and sentenced for four murders and attempted murder, according to section 237 of the Danish Penal Code. In addition, she was deprived of her authorization as a nurse. The court in Nykøbing found it proven that Hansen had given her sick and weak patients lethal doses of morphine and diazepam. The case in the city court extended over 27 days and involved more than 70 witnesses. At the time of the judgment, she appealed to the national court for her case to be dismissed.

In May 2017, she was convicted in a single jury trial by the Østre Landsret for three murders. The High Court review resulted in this being changed to guilty of attempted manslaughter in four cases. On this basis, the court reduced Hansen's punishment from life to 12 years in prison. The reason for the change was, in particular, a forensic and evidence-specific detail: although it was found that Hansen's medical abuse on patients did not occur "in treatment or pain relievers by mistake", the technical evidence was not strong enough to confirm the verdict. The Legal Service Council reviewed the medical information and concluded that it was not possible to be fully sure that the morphine and diazepam injections were the direct causes of death.

In addition to these charges, Hansen was found guilty of giving her own 7-year-old daughter strong prescription sleeping medicine that is dangerous for children and only suitable for adults.

A forensic psychological evaluation determined that Hansen suffered from histrionic personality disorder. A person suffering from this disorder is capable of going to extreme lengths for positive attention. All this and violent self-absorption, which includes narcissism, often makes the person conduct acts towards others so they can be the center of attention.

Her personality disorder was seen by the prosecution as one of the main motives behind the killings. Prosecutor Michael Boelsen stated to the court that "the defendant has arranged herself as the main role character in a bizarre play where the patients are her extras." Although she was described as proficient, the psychiatric report showed that she had average intelligence. Boelsen stated in this context that "she [Hansen] has used her professional insight in a deeply perverted way, which was driven by her histrionic personality disorder".

After her sentence she still maintained her innocence during interviews with the journalist who afterwards wrote a book about the case.

== Aftermath ==
Hansen is the subject of the Netflix series The Nurse which was released on 27 April 2023. The series is based on the book of the same name written by the Danish journalist Kristian Corfixen.

== See also ==
- List of serial killers by country
