= List of 2019 films based on actual events =

This is a list of films and miniseries released in 2019 that are based on actual events. All films on this list are from American production unless indicated otherwise.

== 2019 ==
- 4x4 (2019) – Argentine-Spanish thriller crime film based on Ciro, a criminal who breaks into a 4x4 pickup truck owned by an obstetrician medic Enrique Ferrari to steal a car stereo
- 15 Minutes of War (French: L'intervention) (2019) – French-Belgian war film based on real events known at the Prise d'otages de Loyada
- 72 Hours: Martyr Who Never Died (Hindi: 72 घंटे: शहीद जो कभी नहीं मरा) (2019) – Indian Hindi-language biographical drama film based on the life and times of rifleman Jaswant Singh Rawat, who fought against the enriching Chinese army during the 1962 Sino-Indian War
- 1917 (2019) – British-American war film inspired by stories told to Mendes by his paternal grandfather Alfred
- A Beautiful Day in the Neighborhood (2019) – biographical drama film about Lloyd Vogel, a troubled journalist for Esquire who is assigned to profile television icon Fred Rogers
- A Call to Spy (2019) – historical drama film inspired by the true stories of three women who worked as spies in World War II
- A Girl from Mogadishu (2019) – Irish-Belgian semi-biographical film based on the testimony of Ifrah Ahmed, who having escaped war-torn Somalia, emerged as one of the world's foremost international activists against gender-based violence
- A Hidden Life (2019) – American-German epic historical drama film based on the life of Franz Jägerstätter, an Austrian farmer and devout Catholic who refused to fight for the Nazis in World War II
- A Regular Woman (German: Nur eine Frau) (2019) – German biographical film based on the life of Hatun "Aynur" Sürücü who was killed by her brother in an honor killing
- Abigail (2019) – drama short film inspired by a true story dealing with the subject matter of end-of-life decisions
- Abducted: The Mary Stauffer Story (2019) – crime drama television film based on the true story of the kidnapping of Mary and Elizabeth Stauffer at the hands of Ming Sen Shiue
- Above Suspicion (2019) – crime thriller film revolving around the murder of Susan Smith
- The Accidental Prime Minister (Hindi: द एक्सीडेंटल प्राइम मिनिस्टर) (2019) – Indian Hindi-language biographical drama film about Manmohan Singh, the economist and politician who served as the 13th Prime Minister of India from 2004 to 2014 under the United Progressive Alliance
- The Act (2019) – true crime drama miniseries based on the real life of Gypsy-Rose Blanchard and the murder of her mother, Dee Dee Blanchard, who was accused of abusing her daughter by fabricating illness and disabilities as a direct consequence of Munchausen syndrome by proxy
- Adults in the Room (Greek: Enílikoi stin aíthous) (2019) – French-Greek political drama film based on the 2015 Greek bailout
- The Aeronauts (2019) – British-American biographical adventure film following the balloon expedition of James Glaisher, whose life goal is to travel into the sky to predict the weather and breaks the world record for altitude after reaching a height of 36,000 feet
- Amundsen (2019) – Norwegian biographical film that details the life of Norwegian explorer Roald Amundsen
- An Officer and a Spy (French: J'Accuse) (2019) – French historical drama film about the Dreyfus affair
- Anandi Gopal (Marathi: आनंदी गोपाळ) (2019) – Indian Marathi-language biographical drama film following the life of Anandi Gopal Joshi
- Apache: The Life of Carlos Tevez (Spanish: Apache: La vida de Carlos Tevez) (2019) – Argentine sports drama miniseries about Carlos Tevez's rise as a football player amid the conditions in Argentina's Ejército de Los Andes, better known as Fuerte Apache
- Article 15 (2019) – Indian Hindi-language crime drama film inspired by multiple real-life cases involving crimes driven by caste-based discrimination, including the 2014 Badaun gang rape allegations and 2016 Una flogging incident
- Bad Education (2019) – crime drama film based on the true story of the largest public school embezzlement in American history
- The Balkan Line (Russian: Балканский рубеж; Serbian: Балканска међа) (2019) – Russian-Serbian action film depicting a secret operation to capture Slatina Airport in Kosovo after the bombing of Yugoslavia, led by Yunus-bek Yevkurov
- Batla House (2019) – Indian Hindi-language action thriller film inspired by the Batla House encounter case that took place on 19 September 2008
- Bato (The General Ronald dela Rosa Story) (2019) – Philippine biographical action film about the life of Ronald dela Rosa
- The Battle of Jangsari (Korean: 장사리) (2019) – Korean action war film telling the true story of a group of 772 student soldiers who staged a small diversionary operation at Jangsari beach in Yeongdeok to draw away North Korean attention from Incheon
- The Best of Enemies (2019) – drama film which focuses on the rivalry between civil rights activist Ann Atwater and Ku Klux Klan leader C. P. Ellis
- Bhai: Vyakti Ki Valli (Marathi: भाई : व्यक्ती की वल्ली) (2019) – Indian Marathi-language biographical film about the famous writer Purushottam Laxman Deshpande
- Bhai: Vyakti Ki Valli 2 (Marathi: भाई: व्यक्ती की वल्ली दोन) (2019) – Indian Marathi-language biographical film essaying the achievements of the writer Purushottam Laxman Deshpande
- Blinded by the Light (2019) – British-American comedy drama film inspired by the life of journalist Sarfraz Manzoor and his love of the works of Bruce Springsteen
- Bolden (2019) – drama film based on the life of cornetist Buddy Bolden
- Bombshell (2019) – biographical drama film based upon the accounts of the women at Fox News who set out to expose CEO Roger Ailes for sexual harassment
- The Boy Who Harnessed the Wind (2019) – British-Malawian drama film about the life and experiences of William Kamkwamba
- The Bravest (Chinese: 烈火英雄) (2019) – Chinese disaster film based on a real-life incident, the Xingang Port oil spill, and chronicling firefighters' efforts to protect a city from a fire caused by an oil pipeline explosion
- Breakthrough (2019) – religious drama film about St. Louis author Joyce Smith's son John who slipped through an icy lake in January 2015 and was underwater for 15 minutes before resuscitative efforts were started
- Brecht (2019) – German biographical drama television film dealing with the life and work of the German playwright Bertolt Brecht
- Brexit: The Uncivil War (2019) – British biographical drama television film based on the lead-up to the 2016 referendum through the activities of the strategists behind the Vote Leave campaign, that prompted the United Kingdom to exit the European Union, known as Brexit
- Brittany Runs a Marathon (2019) – comedy film based on the true story of an overweight woman in New York City who sets out to lose weight and train for the city's annual marathon
- Brotherhood (2019) – Canadian historical drama film based on the true story of a group of youth at a summer camp on Balsam Lake in the Kawartha Lakes, who had to fight for survival when an unforeseen thunderstorm overwhelmed their canoe trip
- Capsized: Blood in the Water (2019) – biographical natural horror-survival film based on the 1982 true story of a small boat crew aboard a private yacht who are stranded in shark infested waters, following a storm that overturns their vessel
- The Captain (Chinese: 中國機長) (2019) – Chinese disaster adventure film based on the Sichuan Airlines Flight 8633 incident
- Catherine the Great (2019) – British-American drama miniseries depicting Empress Catherine II of Russia's reign from 1764, two years after taking power, until her death in 1796
- The Cave (Thai: นางนอน) (2019) – Thai action drama film about the 2018 Tham Luang cave rescue in Chiang Rai Province, Thailand
- Chandrabati Kotha (Bengali: চন্দ্রাবতী কোঠা) (2019) – Indian Bengali-language biographical drama film based on the life of Chandravati, first feminist poet of Bengal
- Cherkasy (Ukrainian: Черкаси) (2019) – Ukrainian war drama film about the defense of the eponymous naval Natya-class minesweeper, blocked by Russian troops in Donuzlav Bay, Crimea during the 2014 capture of Southern Naval Base
- Chernobyl (2019) – American-British historical drama miniseries revolving around the Chernobyl nuclear disaster of April 1986 and the cleanup efforts that followed
- Clarita (2019) – Philippine supernatural horror film based on the alleged possession of Clarita Villanueva
- Claws of the Red Dragon (2019) – Canadian drama television film depicting a fictionalization of the political and diplomatic issues surrounding the 2018 arrest of Huawei CFO Meng Wanzhou by the Royal Canadian Mounted Police
- Close (2019) – British action thriller film based on Jacquie Davis, one of the world's leading female bodyguards, whose clients have included J. K. Rowling, Nicole Kidman, and members of the British royal family
- The College Admissions Scandal (2019) – thriller drama television film based on the 2019 college admissions bribery scandal
- Danger Close: The Battle of Long Tan (2019) – Australian war drama film about the Battle of Long Tan during the Vietnam War
- Daniel (Danish: Ser du månen, Daniel) (2019) – Danish biographical film about Daniel Rye who was held hostage by ISIS for 13 months
- Dark Waters (2019) – legal thriller film based on Robert Bilott's real-life legal battle against DuPont over the release of a toxic chemical into Parkersburg, West Virginia's water supply, affecting 70,000 townspeople and livestock
- Dauntless: The Battle of Midway (2019) – action war film based on a true story of United States Navy aviators at the Battle of Midway
- Death of a Cheerleader (2019) – crime drama television film about the Murder of Kirsten Costas
- The Devil Has a Name (2019) – dark comedy film based on the decades-long legal battle between Fred Starrh and Aera Energy over allowing 600 million barrels of oil waste, from unlined wastewater ponds, to contaminate California's Central Valley groundwater where more than half the nuts, fruits and vegetables in the U.S. are grown
- The Dirt (2019) – biographical comedy drama film about Heavy metal band Mötley Crüe
- Dolemite Is My Name (2019) – biographical comedy film about filmmaker Rudy Ray Moore, best known for portraying the character of Dolemite in both his stand-up routine and a series of blaxploitation films, starting with Dolemite in 1975
- Effigy: Poison and the City (German: Effigie – Das Gift und die Stadt) (2019) – German-American historical thriller film about German 19th century female serial killer Gesche Gottfried
- Elcano & Magellan: The First Voyage Around the World (Spanish: Elcano y Magallanes: La primera vuelta al mundo) (2019) – Spanish animated adventure film telling the story of 1519 circumnavigation led by Portuguese explorer Ferdinand Magellan and Spanish navigator Juan Sebastián Elcano
- Elisa & Marcela (Spanish: Elisa y Marcela) (2019) – Spanish biographical romantic drama film based on the story of Elisa Sánchez Loriga and Marcela Gracia Ibeas, two women who posed as a heterosexual couple in order to marry in 1901 at the Church of Saint George in A Coruña becoming the first same-sex matrimony recorded in Spain
- Escaping the NXIVM Cult: A Mother's Fight to Save Her Daughter (2019) – biographical drama miniseries based on Catherine and India Oxenberg and their story of escaping the NXIVM cult
- Extremely Wicked, Shockingly Evil and Vile (2019) – biographical crime thriller film about the life of serial killer Ted Bundy
- The Farewell (Chinese: 别告诉她) (2019) – comedy drama film based on Lulu Wang's experiences with her terminally ill grandmother
- Fighting with My Family (2019) – British-American biographical sports comedy drama film based on the WWE career of English professional wrestler Paige
- Fisherman's Friend's (2019) – British biographical comedy drama film based on a true story about Port Issac's Fisherman's Friends, a group of Cornish fishermen from Port Issac who were signed by Universal Records and achieved a top 10 hit with their debut album of traditional sea shanties
- Ford v Ferrari (2019) – sports drama film about automotive designer Carroll Shelby and race car driver Ken Miles, who lead a team of American engineers and designers from Ford to build a race car that can beat legendary Ferrari
- Fosse/Verdon (2019) – biographical drama miniseries which tells the story of director–choreographer Bob Fosse and actress and dancer Gwen Verdon's troubled personal and professional relationship
- Fuccbois (2019) – Philippines crime drama film on the real life case of Filipino teenagers Christian Lloyd García and Matt Ivan Oda who murdered a local mayor who had been plying them with drugs and filming them having sex, together and with him
- The Gangster, the Cop, the Devil (Korean: 악인전) (2019) – Korean action thriller film based on a true story from 2005 three characters: a serial killer, the gangster who was almost a victim of the killer and the cop who wants to arrest the killer
- Get In (French: Furie) (2019) – French horror thriller film based on a true story of a man dealing with squatters
- Gholamreza Takhti (Persian: غلامرضا تختی) (2019) – Iranian biographical film depicting the life story of Gholamreza Takhti
- Goalie (2019) – Canadian biographical sports film about the hockey goaltender Terry Sawchuk
- The Golden Glove (German: Der Goldene Handschuh) (2019) – German-French horror drama film depicting the story of German serial killer Fritz Honka who murdered four women between 1970 and 1975 and hid the parts of dead bodies in his apartment
- The Great War of Archimedes (Japanese: アルキメデスの大戦) (2019) – Japanese historical film about the building of the battleship Yamato and the political maneuvers, specifically around budget and cost issues, that led to the decision to build the ship
- Gumnaami (2019) – Indian Bengali-language biographical mystery film based on the mystery of Netaji's death
- Harriet (2019) – biographical drama film based on the life of abolitionist Harriet Tubman, who escaped slavery and led hundreds of enslaved people to freedom on the Underground Railroad
- The Haunting of Sharon Tate (2019) – horror thriller film based on the 1969 Tate murders mixed with fictional elements
- Hebe: The Star of Brazil (Portuguese: Hebe: A Estrela do Brasil) (2019) – Brazilian biographical film about TV host Hebe Camargo
- Hell on the Border (2019) – Western biographical film based on the true story of Bass Reeves, the first African-American deputy U.S. Marshal west of the Mississippi River.
- The Highwaymen (2019) – historical crime thriller film about two former Texas Rangers who attempt to track down and apprehend notorious criminals Bonnie and Clyde in the 1930s
- Hustlers (2019) – crime comedy drama film which follows a crew of New York City strippers who begin to steal money by drugging stock traders and CEOs who visit their club, then running up their credit cards
- I Am the Night (2019) – historical crime drama miniseries documenting Fauna Hodel's unusual beginnings and the connection to her grandfather, George Hodel, a prime suspect in the infamous Black Dahlia murder mystery
- I Am Woman (2019) – Australian biographical film about Australian feminist icon Helen Reddy
- Ip Man 4: The Finale (Mandarin: 葉問4：完結篇) (2019) – Chinese martial arts film based on the life of the Wing Chun grandmaster of the same name
- The Irishman (2019) – epic crime gangster film about Frank Sheeran, a truck driver who becomes a hitman involved with mobster Russell Bufalino and his crime family, including his time working for the powerful Teamster Jimmy Hoffa
- John the Apostle, the Most Beloved (Spanish: Juan Apóstol, el más amado) (2019) – Mexican biographical religious film based on the life of John the Apostle
- Judy (2019) – biographical drama film about American singer and actress Judy Garland
- Just Mercy (2019) – biographical legal drama film exploring Bryan Stevenson's journey to making his life's work the defense of African American prisoners
- Kardec (2019) – Brazilian drama film about Léon Denizard Rivail, a French educator who, when studying the phenomenon of “Spinning tables”, discovers that there is the possibility of communicating with the spirits
- Kesari (Hindi: केसरी)(2019) – Indian Hindi-language action war film following the events leading to the Battle of Saragarhi, a battle between 21 soldiers of the 36th Sikhs of the British Indian Army and 10,000 Afridi and Orakzai Pashtun tribesmen in 1897
- The Kid (2019) – Western action film centring around Rio Cutler who forms and unlikely alliance with local sheriff Pat Garret and infamous outlaw Billy the Kid in a mission to rescue his sister Sara from Grant Cutler, the boy's thuggish uncle and gang leader
- The Kill Team (2019) – war drama film depicting a fictionalised adaption of Maywand District murders
- The Killing of Kenneth Chamberlain (2019) – thriller drama film based on the police shooting of Chamberlain in 2011
- The King (2019) – epic historical drama film based on King Henry V of England
- Kingdom (Japanese: キングダム) (2019) – Japanese action adventure film that portrays the life of Li Xin, a general of Qin, from his childhood as an orphan through his military career during the Warring States period of ancient China
- Lakshmi's NTR (Telugu: లక్ష్మీస్ ఎన్టీఆర్) (2019) – Indian Telugu-language biographical drama film based on the life of former film actor and chief minister of undivided Andhra Pradesh, N. T. Rama Rao
- Lancaster Skies (2019) – British war film focusing on the British bomber campaign in World War II
- The Last Full Measure (2019) – war drama film about the Medal of Honor being awarded to William H. Pitsenbarger, a United States Air Force Pararescueman who flew in helicopter rescue missions during the Vietnam War to aid downed soldiers and pilots
- The Last Vermeer (2019) – historical drama film based on the story of Han van Meegeren, an art maker who swindled millions of dollars from the Nazis, alongside Dutch Resistance fighter Joseph Piller
- The Laundromat (2019) – biographical comedy drama film based on the Panama Papers scandal
- The Last Full Measure (2019) – war drama film that tells the true story of Vietnam War hero William H. Pitsenbarger, a U.S. Air Force Pararescuemen (also known as a PJ) who personally saved over sixty men and flew on almost 300 rescue missions during the war to aide downed soldiers and pilots
- The Lighthouse (2019) – American-Canadian horror psychological thriller survival film about two lighthouse keepers who start to lose their sanity when a storm strands them on the remote island on which they are stationed (based, in part, on the Smalls Lighthouse incident, which occurred in 1801)
- Lillian (2019) – Austrian drama film inspired by the true story of Lillian Alling, an Eastern European immigrant to the United States who, in the 1920s, attempted a return by foot to her homeland. Starting in New York, she walked across the United States and Canada trying to cross the Bering Strait
- The Loudest Voice (2019) – biographical drama miniseries depicting Roger Ailes as he creates and guides the rise of Fox News
- Love You to Death (2019) – crime drama television film depicting the events of the Murder of Dee Dee Blanchard
- Manikarnika: The Queen of Jhansi (Hindi: मणिकर्णिका द क्वीन ऑफ़ झाँसी) (2019) – Indian Hindi-language historical drama film based on the life of Rani Lakshmi Bai of Jhansi
- Maria's Paradise (Finnish: Marian paratiisi) (2019) – Finnish biographical drama film based on the life of Maria Åkerblom
- Mercy Black (2019) – horror film loosely based on the story was Mary Bell, who had murdered two toddlers when she was a child
- Midway (2019) – American-Canadian-Chinese war film based on the attack on Pearl Harbor and the subsequent Battle of Midway during World War II
- Military Wives (2019) – British comedy drama film inspired by the true story of the Military Wives Choir
- Mission Mangal (Hindi: मिशन मंगल) (2019) – Indian Hindi-language drama film loosely based on the life of scientists at the Indian Space Research Organisation who contributed to India's first interplanetary expedition Mars Orbiter Mission
- Moffie (2019) – South African-British biographical war romantic drama film depicting mandatory conscription into the notorious South African Defence Force (SADF) during apartheid
- Mosul (Arabic: الموصل) (2019) – Arabic-language war action film based on the 2016 Battle of Mosul, which saw Iraqi Government forces and coalition allies defeat ISIS who had controlled the city since June 2014
- Mr Jones (Polish: Obywatel Jones; Ukrainian: Ціна правди) (2019) – Polish-Ukrainian-British biographical thriller film that tells the story of Welsh journalist Gareth Jones, who in 1933 travels to the Soviet Union and Ukraine and uncovers the Soviet famine of 1932–33
- Mrs Lowry & Son (2019) – British biographical drama film chronicling the life of the renowned artist L. S. Lowry
- The Murder of Nicole Brown Simpson (2019) – crime thriller film based on the murder of Nicole Brown Simpson, presenting an alternative theory of who her killer could have been, serial killer Glen Edward Rogers, as opposed to the main suspect, her ex-husband, O. J. Simpson
- The Mustang (2019) – prison drama film about an incarcerated inmate who participates in a rehabilitation program centered around training of wild horses, based on an actual rehabilitation program in Carson City
- My Name is Sara (2019) – biographical drama film based on the life of Holocaust survivor Sara Góralnik
- NTR: Kathanayakudu (Telugu: కథానాయకుడు) (2019) – Indian Telugu-language biographical film based on the real life and acting career of N. T. Rama Rao
- NTR: Mahanayakudu (Telugu: మహానాయకుడు) (2019) – Indian Telugu-language biographical film based on the real life and political career of N. T. Rama Rao
- Official Secrets (2019) – British-American biographical drama film based on the case of whistleblower Katharine Gun who exposed an illegal spying operation by American and British intelligence services to gauge sentiment of and potentially blackmail United Nations diplomats tasked to vote on a resolution regarding the 2003 invasion of Iraq
- Oh Mercy! (French: Roubaix, une lumière) (2019) – French crime drama film inspired by the 2008 TV documentary Roubaix, commissariat central, directed by Mosco Boucault
- On Death Row (Spanish: En el corredor de la muerte) (2019) – Spanish drama miniseries depicting the judicial case that began in 1994 when South Florida club owner Casimir Sucharski and his house guests, Sharon Anderson and Marie Rodgers, were found shot to death in Sucharski's house in Miramar, Florida
- Once Upon a Time in London (2019) – British crime drama film about the notorious gangsters Billy Hill and Jack Comer
- Our Friend (2019) – biographical drama film based on Matthew Teague's 2015 Esquire article "The Friend: Love Is Not a Big Enough Word"
- The Outpost (2019) – war action film about the Battle of Kamdesh in the War in Afghanistan
- Panipat (Hindi: पानीपत) (2019) – Indian Hindi-language epic war film depicting the events that took place during the Third Battle of Panipat
- Patsy & Loretta (2019) – biographical drama television film based on the friendship between country singers Patsy Cline and Loretta Lynn
- Pocket Hercules: Naim Suleymanoglu (Turkish: Cep Herkülü: Naim Süleymanoglu) (2019) – Turkish biographical drama film about the life of Naim Suleymanoglu, nicknamed "Pocket Hercules"
- The Professor and the Madman (2019) – biographical drama film about the professor, James Murray, who in 1879 began compiling the Oxford English Dictionary and led the overseeing committee, and W. C. Minor, a doctor who submitted over 10,000 entries while he was undergoing treatment at Broadmoor Criminal Lunatic Asylum
- Radioactive (2019) – British biographical drama film based on the life of Marie Curie
- The Red Sea Diving Resort (2019) – Canadian-American spy thriller film which is loosely based on the events of Operation Moses and Operation Joshua in 1984–1985, in which the Mossad covertly evacuated Jewish Ethiopian refugees to Israel
- The Report (2019) – historical political drama film following staffer Daniel Jones and the Senate Intelligence Committee as they investigate the CIA's use of torture following the September 11 attacks
- Richard Jewell (2019) – biographical drama film depicting the Centennial Olympic Park bombing and its aftermath during the 1996 Summer Olympics in Atlanta, Georgia, in which security guard Richard Jewell found a bomb and alerted authorities to evacuate, only to later be wrongly accused of having placed the device himself
- Ride Like a Girl (2019) – Australian biographical sports drama film based on the true story of Michelle Payne, the first female jockey to win the Melbourne Cup in 2015
- Robert the Bruce (2019) – historical war drama film concerning the renowned king of the same name
- Rocketman (2019) – biographical musical drama film based on the life of musician Elton John
- Roe v. Wade (2019) – political legal drama film about the 1973 landmark decision of the same name, rendered by the U.S. Supreme Court on the issue of the constitutionality of laws that criminalized or restricted access to abortions
- Run This Town (2019) – Canadian-American drama film based on the final year of Rob Ford's tenure as the mayor of Toronto
- Samurai Marathon (Japanese: サムライマラソン) (2019) – Japanese-British historical action adventure film inspired by the origin story of the Ansei Toashi 30-km footrace held annually in Annaka City
- Seberg (2019) – political thriller film about Jean Seberg, who in the late 1960s was targeted by the FBI because of her support of the civil rights movement and romantic involvement with Hakim Jamal, among others
- The Shiny Shrimps (French: Les Crevettes pailletées) (2019) – French sports comedy film about an Olympic swimming champion who makes a homophobic comment in a television interview, and is disciplined by the national swim team with the responsibility of coaching a gay water polo team who aspire to compete in the Gay Games
- The Sholay Girl (Hindi: रेशमा पठान) (2019) – Indian Hindi-language biographical historical drama film based on India's first stuntwoman, Reshma Pathan
- Shooting Clerks (2019) – British-American biographical comedy drama film detailing how Kevin Smith bankrolled his $27,000 first film with maxed-out credit cards and garnered career-making critical attention at the Sundance Film Festival when Clerks debuted there in 1994
- Sister Aimee (2019) – biographical drama film dramatizing the disappearance of Aimee Semple McPherson
- Soldier Boy (Russian: Солдатик) (2019) – Russian war drama film based on the real-life story of the youngest soldier in World War II, Sergei Aleshkov, who was only 6 years old
- Song Without a Name (Spanish: Canción sin nombre) (2019) – Peruvian drama film based on true event of an indigenous Andean woman whose newborn baby is whisked away moments after its birth in a downtown Lima clinic - and never returned
- The Souvenir (2019) – British-American drama film depicting a semi-autobiographical account of Joanna Hogg's experiences at film school
- The Spy (2019) – French espionage thriller miniseries based on the life of Israel's top Mossad spy Eli Cohen
- Super 30 (Hindi: बहुत अच्छा) (2019) – Indian Hindi-language biographical drama film narrating the life of mathematician Anand Kumar and his educational program of the same name
- Sye Raa Narasimha Reddy (Telugu: సైరా నరసింహా రెడ్డి) (2019) – Indian Telugu-language historical action film inspired by the life of Indian independence activist Uyyalawada Narasimha Reddy from the Rayalaseema region of Andhra Pradesh
- Tashkent Files (2019) – Indian Hindi-language conpiracy thriller film about the death of former Indian prime minister Lal Bahadur Shastri
- Thackeray (2019) – Indian biographical film following the life of Balasaheb Thackeray, the founder of the Indian political party Shiv Sena
- Togo (2019) – historical adventure film centering on Leonhard Seppala and his titular sled dog in the 1925 serum run to Nome to transport diphtheria antitoxin serum through harsh conditions during an epidemic of diphtheria
- Tolkien (2019) – British-American biographical drama film about the early life of English professor J. J. R. Tolkien, author of The Hobbit and The Lord of the Rings, as well as notable academic works
- The Traitor (Italian: Il traditore) (2019) – Italian biographical crime drama film about the life of Tommaso Buscetta, the first Sicilian Mafia boss who was treated by some as pentito
- Trapped: The Alex Cooper Story (2019) – biographical drama television film about Alex Cooper's experience in being sent to a conversion therapy home and the brutalities she endured while there
- The Trial of Christine Keeler (2019) – British political drama miniseries based on the chain of events surrounding the Profumo affair in the 1960s
- True History of the Kelly Gang (2019) – British-Australian biographical bushranger film based on the story of Australian bushranger Ned Kelly and his gang as they flee from authorities during the 1870s
- The Two Popes (2019) – biographical drama film predominantly set in the Vatican City in the aftermath of the Vatican leaks scandal
- Unbelievable (2019) – true crime drama miniseries about a series of rapes in Washington State and Colorado
- Union of Salvation (Russian: Союз спасения) (2019) – Russian war epic historical adventure film about veterans of the French invasion of Russia of 1812, who conspired to install Konstantin Pavlovich as the new tsar of the Russian Empire, transform Russia into a constitutional state and abolish serfdom
- Unplanned (2019) – drama film following Abby Johnson's life as a clinic director for Planned Parenthood and her subsequent transition to anti-abortion activism
- Uri: The Surgical Strike (Hindi: उरी) (2019) – Indian Hindi-language war action film based on the true events of the retaliation to the 2016 Uri attack
- Vault (2019) – crime thriller film based on the Bonded Vault heist in 1975 in Rhode Island
- Virus (Malayalam: വൈറസ്) (2019) – Indian Malayalam-language medical thriller film set in backdrop of the 2018 Nipah virus outbreak in Kerala
- Walk. Ride. Rodeo. (2019) – biographical drama film about the life of Amberley Snyder, a nationally ranked rodeo barrel racer who defies the odds to return to the sport after barely surviving a car crash that leaves her paralysed from the waist down
- The Warrior Queen of Jhansi (2019) – British historical drama film on the 1857 Indian Rebellion against the British East India Company
- Wasp Network (2019) – spy thriller film based on the true story of Cuban spies in American territory during the 1990s
- When Hitler Stole Pink Rabbit (German: Als Hitler das rosa Kaninchen stahl) (2019) – German war drama film based upon the early life of Judith Kerr whose Jewish father, noted drama critic, journalist and screenwriter Alfred Kerr, was wanted by the Nazis
- When They See Us (2019) – crime drama miniseries based on events of the 1989 Central Park jogger case
- While at War (Spanish: Mientras dure la guerra) (2019) – Spanish-Argentine historical drama film following the plight of philosopher and writer Miguel de Unamuno in Salamanca, a city controlled by the Rebel faction
- Yatra (Telugu: యాత్ర) (2019) – Indian Telugu-language biographical film based on padayatra of Reddy who served as Chief Minister of Andhra Pradesh from May 2004 to June 2009 representing Indian National Congress
