= Death of a Cheerleader =

Death of a Cheerleader may refer to:

- Death of a Cheerleader (album), by Pom Pom Squad in 2021
- A Friend to Die For, 1994 film that is also known as Death of a Cheerleader
  - Death of a Cheerleader (2019 film), a remake of the 1994 film
- Riverdale: Death of a Cheerleader, 2020 book by Micol Ostow
