= Beyond the Black Rainbow =

2010 film by Panos Cosmatos

- Theatrical release poster
- Directed by: Panos Cosmatos
- Written by: Panos Cosmatos
- Produced by: Oliver Linsley; Christya Nordstokke
- Starring: Michael Rogers; Eva Allan; Scott Hylands; Marilyn Norry; Rondel Reynoldson
- Cinematography: Norm Li
- Edited by: Nicholas T. Shepard
- Music by: Sinoia Caves
- Production company: Chromewood Productions
- Distributed by: Mongrel Media
- Release dates: 3 December 2010 (Whistler Film Festival); 11 September 2012 (United States)
- Running time: 109 minutes
- Country: Canada
- Language: English
- Budget: $1.1 million
- Box office: $56,491 (US)

Beyond the Black Rainbow is a 2010 Canadian psychedelic science fiction horror film written and directed by Panos Cosmatos in his feature film debut. It stars Michael Rogers and Eva Allan.

Beyond the Black Rainbow was distributed by Mongrel Media in Canada, and by Magnet Releasing, a sub-division of Magnolia Pictures, in the United States. Produced and filmed in Vancouver, the film premiered at the 2010 Whistler Film Festival, in Whistler, British Columbia. Through 2011, it was also screened at several film festivals across North America, including Tribeca Film Festival in New York City, Fantastic Fest in Austin, Texas and Fantasia Film Festival in Montreal.

== Plot ==
In the 1960s, Dr. Mercurio Arboria founded the Arboria Institute, a research facility dedicated to allowing humans to move into a New Age of "Serenity Through Technology" and perpetual happiness. In 1983, Arboria's protégé Dr. Barry Nyle runs the Institute. His main subject is Elena. Held in captivity within the institute, Elena possesses a burgeoning power of telepathy, which Nyle keeps in check with a glowing prismatic device.

During the day, Nyle subjects Elena to "therapy" sessions, during one of which Elena telepathically begs to see her father, but Nyle tells her she isn't well enough yet. At night, Nyle returns home to his kind but lethargic wife Rosemary. Nyle takes considerable quantities of prescription medications from Benway Pharmacy before bed.

In another session, Nyle speaks about Elena's dead mother, mentioning how beautiful and desirable she was and remarking on Elena's resemblance to her. Following his hints, Elena finds her mother's photo under her bed. That evening, nurse Margo stumbles upon Elena's case notes, containing strange images and diagrams that suggest Nyle's sexual obsession with her. She puts the notes back, but he realizes her discovery when he finds the ash from her cigarette.

Nyle stages a confrontation between Margo and Elena over the photograph, then deactivates the prism. Elena telekinetically kills Margo, thrilling Nyle. He briefly allows Elena to leave her cell before reactivating the prism, incapacitating her. He summons a "Sentionaut", encased in a red environment suit. The Sentionaut gives Elena an injection in the neck and returns her to her cell.

Nyle visits Dr. Arboria, who displays signs of senility and drug addiction. A flash-back to 1966 reveals that Elena's mother Anna was Arboria's wife and colleague. Arboria submitted a young Nyle to a procedure meant to help him transcend. After being submerged in a vat of dark liquid and experiencing otherworldly, hellish visions, Nyle emerged deranged and killed Anna. Unperturbed by his wife's death, it is suggested Arboria submitted his infant daughter Elena to the same procedure. Back in the present, Nyle assists Arboria in a drug fix and apparently intentionally gives him a lethal dose which soon kills him. Nyle returns home and removes his hairpiece and contact lenses, revealing a bald head and black irises. Declaring his spiritual ascendancy to Rosemary, Nyle proceeds to crush her skull.

Meanwhile, Elena escapes her cell. Evading the prism's detection, the Sentionaut and other threats, Elena finds the way out and sees the night sky for the first time. Nyle arrives at the institute to find Elena gone. Using a receiver for Elena's tracking device, Nyle eventually finds her in a clearing and repeatedly implores her to come to him. Nyle's feet become entangled in plant roots, causing him to fall and hit his head against a rock, killing him instantly. Elena soon finds her way to a suburban development, guided by the light generated by a television set.

== Cast ==
- Michael Rogers as Barry Nyle, the Head of Research of the Arboria Institute. He goes insane after a psychic experience in 1966.
- Eva Bourne (credited as Eva Allan) as Elena, the daughter of Anna and Mercurio Arboria. Due to the experiments at the Arboria Institute (where she is kept in isolation), she gains psychic powers.
- Scott Hylands as Mercurio Arboria, a reclusive new age spiritual leader who founded the Arboria Institute in order to help people find spiritual happiness and transcendence.
- Marilyn Norry as Rosemary Nyle, Barry's docile wife.
- Rondel Reynoldson as Margo, a nurse who lacks empathy.
- Sara Stockstad as Anna Arboria, the mother of Elena and wife of Mercurio. She is seen only in flashbacks and photographs.
- Roy Campsall as the Sentionaut, an artificial bioform kept in storage at the Arboria Institute.

== Production ==
=== Development ===
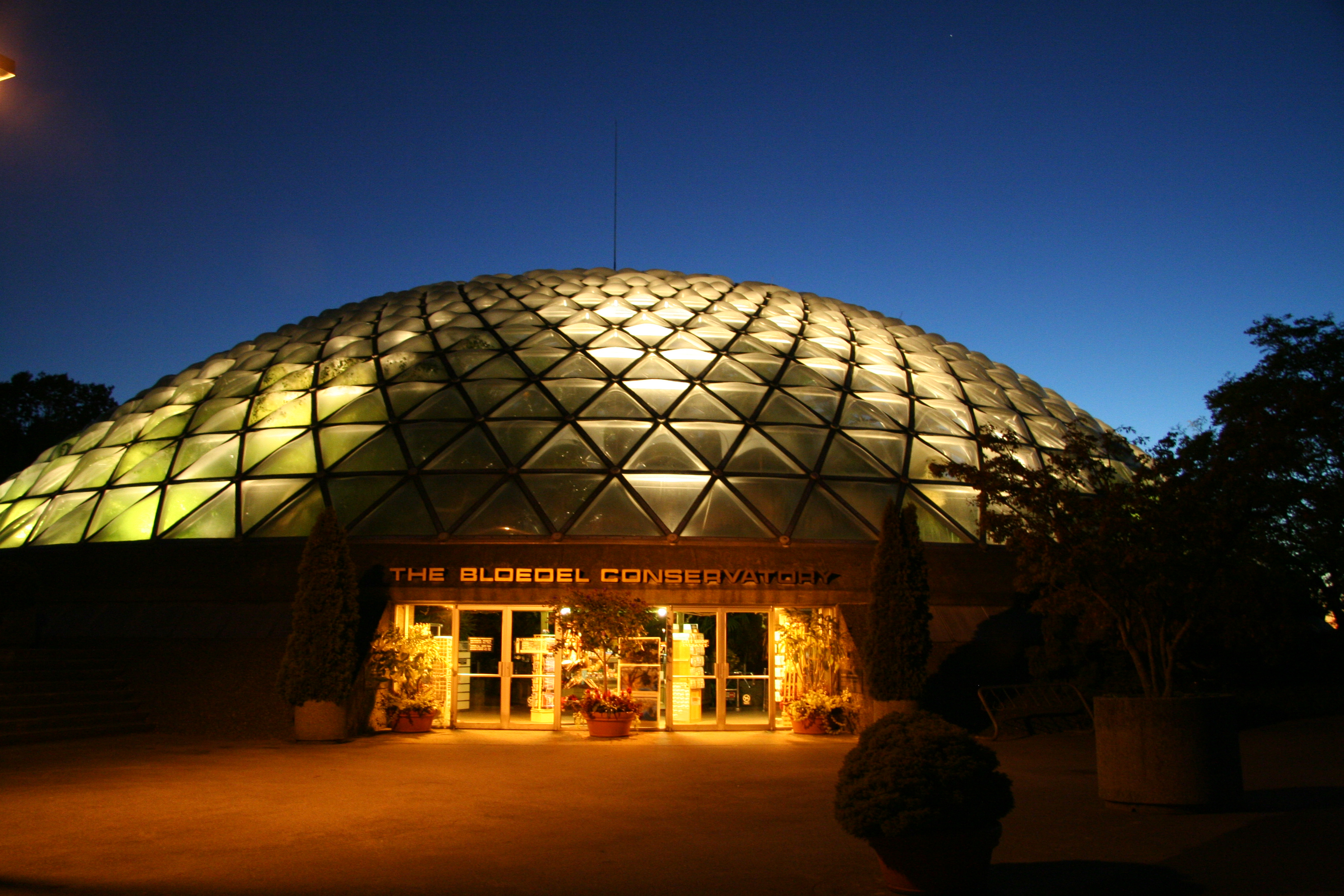
The interior and exterior of the Bloedel Floral Conservatory was used numerous times in the film

As a child, Cosmatos frequented a video store named Video Attic. During these trips he would browse the horror film section looking at the boxes although he was not allowed to watch such films. During such times he would instead imagine what the film was. He would later reflect upon this experience when making Black Rainbow where one of his goals was "to create a film that is a sort of imagining of an old film that doesn't exist." The year 1983 was chosen for the story as it was the first year he went to Video Attic. Additionally, he thought the idea of setting such a film one year before 1984 was funny. The film's genesis was an overlap between two projects Cosmatos wanted to do. One of these was a film about a girl trapped in an asylum while the other was an installation promoting a non-existent research facility. Eventually Cosmatos realized that he could use both ideas in the same project.

The presence of his parents haunts "every frame of this film", said the Rome-born filmmaker. His father was film director George P. Cosmatos (whose credits include Rambo: First Blood Part II and Cobra), deceased in April 2005, and his mother Swedish sculptor Birgitta Ljungberg-Cosmatos, who died in July 1997 after a lengthy battle with cancer. Unable to deal with his mother's death, Panos "drifted into a slow motion mode of self-destruction and binge drinking." When his father died too, the grief he felt compounded. After that the aspiring writer/director started therapy and decided he wanted to make a film as part of the healing process. Cosmatos felt that his "filmmaking sensibility is a weird hybrid of both of them" – his father's "popcorn movies" and his mother's haunting, experimental art.

=== Casting ===
Eva Allan, who plays the main female lead, found an acting agent right away after graduating from School Creative which led to her role on this film.

=== Filming ===
Beyond the Black Rainbow was financed by DVD residuals from Tombstone (1993), directed by Panos' father. The film was shot in three weeks using a modified Panavision 35 mm camera. This was suggested by cinematographer Norm Li, for he noted that Panos' references – mostly films from the '70s and '80s – "were all grainy, colorful, and full of texture", and he felt the 35 mm format was "the only way to shoot."

=== Style and influences ===
==== Visuals ====
Beyond the Black Rainbow has been praised for its visual style. Cosmatos declared that his "modernist" use of color was influenced by Michael Mann's Manhunter (1986) and The Keep (1983). The blue hue cinematography – the "night mode" as Cosmatos dubbed it – was inspired by the freezer room scene in John Carpenter's Dark Star (1974). Norm Li cited other references: Daft Punk's Electroma (2006), Dario Argento's Suspiria (1977), and George Lucas' THX 1138 (1971). A number of reviewers noted similarities between the film and Stanley Kubrick's 2001: A Space Odyssey (1968) and A Clockwork Orange (1971). "I love Stanley Kubrick, and have seen, and probably internalized, all of his work, but any similarity was not my intent", explained Cosmatos. Critics have also compared Beyond the Black Rainbow to Andrei Tarkovsky's Solaris (1972), Ken Russell's Altered States (1980), and Gaspar Noé's Enter the Void (2010). Of the latter, the director deemed it "a very interesting, very beautiful film."

Barry Nyle descends into the black liquid as he starts his 1966 psychic journey.

The 1966 flashback segment of the movie was inspired by E. Elias Merhige's experimental horror film Begotten (1989). Begotten was entirely shot in high-contrast black-and-white, which for Cosmatos "was a perfect look for the flashback because I wanted it to feel like a fading and decayed artifact." The young Barry Nyle's acid trip in that segment of Beyond the Black Rainbow was inspired by the "Battle of the Gods" sequence in Jean-Luc Godard's Contempt (1963).

Cosmatos also takes influence from other visual media. The director declared his love for Heavy Metal magazine and the work of French comics artist Jean "Moebius" Giraud. Fantasy art was also an influence, especially Frank Frazetta's paintings. Norm Li stated that both he and the director "also looked at abstract paintings, photographs, and architectural design books" for inspiration.

==== Pacing ====
One of Beyond the Black Rainbow's notable characteristics is its deliberately slow, hypnotic pace. According to Cosmatos, Beyond the Black Rainbow belongs to what he dubbed the "trance film" subgenre. Cosmatos mentioned Francis Ford Coppola's Apocalypse Now (1979), Alain Resnais' Last Year at Marienbad (1961) and Saul Bass's Phase IV (1974) as cinematographic blueprints for his debut film. Cosmatos explained the rationale behind his screen-writing, which downplays the "very concrete story at the heart of it" in favor of an "atmospheric" approach:

I decided to just write as straightforward as possible, then let the visuals and the look of the film bloom around something that was pretty straightforward. At the end of the day, I decided to bring down the story elements to allow the visual and the story elements to come more into the foreground, to make it more dream-like and less story-driven.

=== Music ===
Jeremy Schmidt, keyboard player for Vancouver-based rockers Black Mountain, was invited by Cosmatos to compose the film's soundtrack. "Evil Ball", a track from Schmidt's solo project, Sinoia Caves, was used by the movie's director on a private screening held for Schmidt. A mutual appreciation for Tangerine Dream, John Carpenter soundtracks and Giorgio Moroder's music for Midnight Express (1978) and American Gigolo (1980) cemented their bond. Schmidt also pointed out the background music from The Shining (1980) and Risky Business (1983) as musical blueprints for the Beyond the Black Rainbow score.

Regarding the impact of The Shining's soundtrack on his score, Schmidt singled out the compositions by György Ligeti and Krzysztof Penderecki as sonic touchstones. Their music had already been featured in the sci-fi and horror genres, two of Cosmatos's main cinematic obsessions when young. Ligeti pieces "Lux Aeterna" and "Atmosphères" had been featured in 2001: A Space Odyssey, and Penderecki's "Polymorphia" and a portion of "The Devils of Loudun" was used in The Exorcist (1973).

For his analogue synthesizer score, Schmidt used the following equipment: a Prophet 5, two Oberheims, Moog Taurus bass pedals, a Korg CX-3 organ and a Mellotron. An extensive use of the Mellotron can be heard on the flashback sequence, where Cosmatos had been using Pink Floyd's "Set the Controls for the Heart of the Sun" as a temp track. All in all, "the chosen palette of sounds definitely harkens back to 'The New Age of Enlightenment'", said Schmidt. The music was mixed by Joshua Stevenson at Otic Sound, Vancouver, British Columbia, Canada.

== Themes ==
=== Control ===
Director Cosmatos has discussed his interest in social control mechanisms, our own personal, internal controls and how religion affects our consciousness and society. These philosophical ideas are present in Beyond the Black Rainbow, a film focused on issues of repression and control of emotions. Cosmatos partly picked up these themes by reading the science fiction works of Beat novelist William S. Burroughs, books dealing, by and large, with societal control.

According to Cosmatos, the "rigid geometric world" of the Arboria Institute visually fits the movie's control theme. This is especially true for the Dr. Nyle character, someone "very knowledged, trying to create a very controlled environment to give himself a feeling of power." The glowing tetrahedron, responsible for dampening Elena's psychic powers, is another control symbol. The institute's plethora of reflecting surfaces – the walls in the hallways, the giant piece of glass in the therapy room, the infinity-mirrored Sentionaut room, Margo's glasses – might somewhat hint at this idea. To many ancient cultures, the mirror was a symbol of self-awareness, consciousness and intelligence, but also a source of pride and vanity. The visual reference for Arboria Institute's interior design was THX 1138.

The film's control leitmotif is shown in a subtler way by reflecting North America's political climate in the 1980s. Beyond the Black Rainbow has been called a "Reagan-era fever dream". Its paranoid, Cold War mood contains nods to the late U.S. president – through a clip of an ominous televised speech by Ronald Reagan himself – and former Panamanian general and convicted drug lord Manuel Noriega (Dr. Nyle's "Noriega" jacket).

=== Identity ===
Another of Beyond the Black Rainbow‘s main themes is identity. Over the course of the movie Dr. Nyle experiences a radical change of personality whose roots lie in the terrifying drug experience he had in 1966, under Mercurio Arboria's supervision. Being exposed to his shadow side so intensely crippled not only his mind, but his body: Barry is forced to use appliances such as a wig and contact lenses. Similar to many Lovecraftian protagonists, Barry Nyle is ultimately a pathetic character: his far-reaching knowledge, restrained demeanor and carefully controlled work environment are unable to dominate the forces of irrationality and chaos burning in his mind. In the end, the doctor undergoes a physical and psychological transformation where he forfeits all control and gives in to madness.

=== Criticism of "Baby Boomers" of the 1960s and the conservative backlash of the 1980s ===
Cosmatos admits a dislike for Baby Boomers' spiritual ideals, an issue he addresses in Beyond the Black Rainbow. For him, the Boomers' search for alternative belief systems made them dabble in the dark side of occultism, which in turn corrupted their quest for spiritual enlightenment. The use of psychedelic drugs for mind-expansion purposes is also explored, although Cosmatos' take on it is "dark and disturbing" — a "brand of psychedelia that stands in direct opposition to the flower child, magic mushroom peace trip," one reviewer wrote. UGO Networks's Jordan Hoffman noted both elements, stating in his review that in the movie some "up-to-no-good new age scientists have let their experiments with consciousness-altering drugs mutate a young woman" – in this case, Elena. Cosmatos explains why Dr. Arboria's mission to create a superior human ultimately failed:

I look at Arboria as kind of naïve. He had the best of intentions of wanting to expand human consciousness, but I think his ego got in the way of that and ultimately it turned into a poisonous, destructive thing. Because Arboria is trying to control consciousness and control the mind. There is a moment of truth in the film where the whole thing starts to disintegrate because it stops being about their humanity and becomes about an unattainable goal. That is the "Black Rainbow": trying to achieve some kind of unattainable state that is ultimately, probably destructive.

German film critic Hauke Lehmann, C. H. Newell writing at Father Son Holy Gore, and Mike Lesuer of Flood Magazine summarize Cosmatos's message with both Beyond the Black Rainbow and his next film Mandy as that the progressive social, political, and cultural utopias of the 1960s (as represented by Dr. Arboria and his original plans with his institute) went wrong because they weren't prepared yet for what lay beyond Aldous Huxley and Timothy Leary's doors of perception, thus inviting the counter-movement in the form of the conservative, right-wing 1980s (represented by Barry). Likewise, Simon Abrams and Steven Boone of Hollywood Reporter also note Cosmatos's harsh criticisms of the American conservative right of the 1980s. For this reason Lehmann, in his aforementioned Cinema essay, calls Beyond the Black Rainbow an "even more advanced version" of the social and political themes found in Easy Rider and Fear and Loathing in Las Vegas.

== Reception and legacy ==
Cosmatos noted that critical reception of the film was originally "kind of muted, even downright negative" at first, but it began picking up better reviews after Tribeca 2011.

The film has an approval rating of 61% on Rotten Tomatoes based on 36 reviews and an average score of 6.30/10. Metacritic, which uses a weighted average, assigned the film a score of 49 out of 100, based on 10 critics, indicating "mixed or average" reviews. Negative reviews focused generally on the surreal inscrutability of the plot and accusations of shallow pastiche; Tony Norman of the Pittsburgh Post-Gazette called it "all ambiance and no substance", and Joe Neumaier of The New York Daily News called it a boring failure. Mark Feeney of The Boston Globe cited the atmosphere "that's impressively sustained – until it becomes oppressive, then pointless, then laughable," with the concept better suited to a short film. Some mixed reviews, like William Goss of MSN, praised the film's surreal atmosphere and synth score, despite finding it "not my cup of crazy", while Marjorie Baumgarten of the Austin Chronicle cited the movie as inexplicable and incomprehensible, though praising the visuals. Jeannette Catsoulis of The New York Times also gave a mixed review, highlighting the appeal to fans of midnight movies.

Positive reviews highlighted the cult appeal, such as Matt Singer of Time Out, who welcomed the return of challenging, surreal midnight movies. Alison Willmore of The A.V. Club rated it B+, praising its style and daring form. Don R. Lewis of Film Threat also praised the film, saying, "As a cinema fan I was blown away at the control and attention to detail Cosmatos showed."

During the second half of the 2010s, however, Beyond the Black Rainbow has undergone a critical reappraisal. Writing for Inverse in 2017, pop culture critic Isaac Feldberg praised Beyond the Black Rainbow as an examination of Cosmatos' own nostalgia for the sci-fi and horror movies of his youth; "Cosmatos imagines an alternate ‘80s in which their aesthetics can be so completely expressed they assume physical form, seeping through the Arboria Institute like a fog of cultural memory," he wrote. The film has garnered spots on various best-of lists of professional reviewers – #27 on The Playlist's 2016 The 50 Best Sci-Fi Films Of The 21st Century So Far, #20 on The Film Stage's 2016 The 50 Best Sci-Fi Films of the 21st Century Thus Far, #19 on Fandor's 2016 Best Science Fiction of the Century (so far), and #1 on Taste of Cinema's 2017 10 totally awesome Sci-Fi movies from the 2010s (so far).

In a 2016 interview with The Hollywood Reporter about their smash hit Netflix series, Matt Duffer expressed surprise at allegations that Stranger Things was a direct homage to Beyond The Black Rainbow, which he claimed to have never seen before, while Ross Duffer admitted to having seen "a little" of it.
