= Hollow in the Land =

2017 film

- Film poster
- Directed by: Scooter Corkle
- Written by: Scooter Corkle
- Produced by: Michael Babiarz; Marlaina Mah; Jesse Savath
- Starring: Dianna Agron; Shawn Ashmore
- Cinematography: Norm Li
- Edited by: Aynsley Baldwin
- Music by: Edo Van Breemen
- Production companies: Oddfellows Entertainment; Savath Pictures
- Release date: 20 June 2017 (SIFF)
- Running time: 92 minutes
- Country: Canada
- Language: English

Hollow in the Land is a 2017 Canadian thriller film directed by Scooter Corkle. While Keith Miller remains locked behind bars for the murder of Eli Balkoff, his family is paying the price. A year after Keith's crime, a body is found in a nearby trailer park. Keith's son, Brandon, goes missing and becomes suspect number one. His sister Alison decides to track down her brother to clear his name before the cops get to him. The more she looks, the more people turn up dead.

== Plot ==
It is a year after Keith Miller has been convicted for killing a young man, Eli Balkoff, in a car accident. Eli was the son of the owner of a pulp mill, the main industry in Castlegar, British Columbia, a town in the mountains where Keith and his children Alison and Brandon live. Alison works at the mill. Tensions are still running high in the small community, and Brandon gets into a fight after being taunted about his father by a local drug dealer, Leland. Brandon is arrested but not charged as he is still a minor and Alison, as his legal guardian, has to pick him from the police station. It is not the first time Brandon has got into trouble. Officer Darryl Tarasoff, who knows Alison, warns her that once Brandon becomes an adult in a few months' time he will not be treated so leniently.

Alison and Brandon argue about Brandon's behaviour, and Brandon leaves with his girlfriend Sophie Hinters and his friend Tyler. Sophie's parents Earl and Charlene are separated and battling over custody of Sophie. Alison had previously been in a relationship with Charlene.

Later, Brandon is with Sophie in Earl's trailer in a trailer park when Earl unexpectedly returns, bursts in, and accuses Brandon of sexually assaulting Sophie. Sophie shouts that Brandon is her boyfriend, but an altercation ensues. The police turn up at Alison and Brandon's home with news that Earl has been found dead. As Brandon is missing, he is considered the prime suspect. Alison decides to take matters into her own hands and track down her brother to clear his name before the police find him.

Alison learns that Earl had been at the bowling alley when he received a telephone call, which caused him to become furious and head home. She visits the bowling alley looking for information, steals a timetable, and discovers that Freya was working at the time when Earl answered the telephone. Alison finds Freya, who turns out to be Tyler's girlfriend. Freya confirms that she saw Earl taking the call and storming out of the bowling alley, but claims not to know who called Earl.

Darryl discloses to Alison that there was evidence of an unknown person having been present at Earl's trailer. Alison visits the trailer and finds a strange doll's head with its hair in a mohawk on the ground outside. Somebody seems to be watching from the shadows. Darryl and the police chief later turn up at her home to quiz her about her visit to the trailer park.

Alison visits Charlene's home. She is out, but Sophie is there. Sophie identifies the doll's head as a punk ornament which Leland used to wear, and says that Freya used to date Leland. Alison confronts Freya again, and she admits that the person who called Earl at the bowling alley was Leland. Freya gives Alison Leland's address. However, when Alison visits Leland's home she finds that Leland has been murdered. She notices a cigarette butt stained with red lipstick in an ashtray. The police turn up while she is still at the scene, and assume that Alison has murdered Leland. As the police are searching for her, she abandons her car and manages to escape on foot back to town.

Alison finds her colleague Lenny drunk in a car park, and offers to drive him home in his truck. On the way, Alison stops at Charlene's but no one is home. However, Alison notices the same type of cigarette butt stained with lipstick in an ashtray. Alison visits Charlene's workplace and learns that Charlene failed to turn up for work that day.

Alison spots Tyler on a motorcycle and gives chase. He says that he is with Brandon who is all right. However, someone is pursuing them. When Tyler spots a car, he rides off without telling her where he and Brandon are hiding. Alison finds Freya at a house party, and Freya tells her that Tyler and Brandon are hiding up in the hills near Pass Creek, but that Tyler had told her not to inform anyone.

Alison finds the campsite where Tyler and Brandon have been hiding, only to find that Tyler has been killed as well. There is no sign of Brandon. Somebody shoots at her from the trees, and she is hit in the shoulder. She runs away and sees a red muscle car leaving the scene. She walks along the river looking for help and finds a cabin where Ruth and Debbie, who grow marijuana, live. Ruth and Debbie tend to Alison's wound and allow her to stay overnight, though Debbie wants Alison to leave as soon as possible because she believes Alison will cause trouble for them.

Alison sees a newspaper reporting the anniversary of Eli's murder, and realizes that the photograph of Eli on the front page shows him leaning against a red muscle car like the one she saw at the campsite. With a truck and a rifle lent by Ruth, Alison drives to the home of Eli's mother Helen Balkoff. She confronts Helen with the rifle, and Helen admits that the red car was Eli's. She says she previously had an affair with the police chief, and he is now harassing her because she refused to leave her husband. She also says that the chief had killed Earl, and had compelled her to lend him the car.

Alison calls Darryl and tells him that she found Tyler dead and that someone had shot at her. Darryl says he has found out that Leland had been present at Earl's trailer; he had first called Earl, and after Earl had returned to the trailer he had called the police. Alison asks Darryl to meet her at Charlene's home.

When Alison arrives she is shot at, and returns fire. It turns out that Sophie fired a revolver thinking Alison was an intruder, and that Alison's return shot has hit Charlene in the leg. Charlene admits that she had contacted and paid Leland to call Earl at the bowling alley, claiming that Brandon was sexually assaulting Sophie. Her only intent had been to obtain evidence of Earl's violent behaviour of beating Brandon up to support her claim for custody of Sophie. Darryl arrives, but then the police chief also appears; he is armed, and forces Alison and Darryl to drop their weapons. When Darryl tries to grab the rifle, the chief shoots him in the abdomen. It is revealed that Eli was the police chief's son from his affair with Helen, and that he had intended to take revenge for Keith causing Eli's death by murdering Brandon at Earl's trailer, and then murdering Earl to frame him for Brandon's death. Sophie fires her revolver at the chief, enabling Alison to retrieve the rifle. There is an exchange of gunfire as the chief runs out of the house and tries to escape by car. Alison shoots at the car and kills the chief.

While Alison visits Charlene and Darryl in hospital, a search party of locals scours the hills looking for Brandon. They eventually find him traumatized and distressed but alive. Alison and Brandon finally visit their father in prison.

== Cast ==
- Dianna Agron - Alison Miller
- Shawn Ashmore - Officer Darryl Tarasoff
- Rachelle Lefevre - Charlene Hinters
- Michael Rogers - Chief
- Brent Stait - Lenny
- Jared Abrahamson - Brandon Miller
- Sarah Dugdale – Sophie Hinters
- John Sampson – Earl Hinters
- Jessica McLeod – Freya/Freya's sister's voice
- Gina Chiarelli – Helen Balkoff
- David Lennon – Tyler
- Marilyn Norry – Ruth
- Glynis Davies – Debbie
- Cameron Hilts – Justin D
- Cody Chernenkov - Leland
