= A Friend to Die For =

1994 television film directed by William A. Graham

- Genre: Crime; Drama
- Based on: "Death of a Cheerleader" by Randall Sullivan
- Screenplay by: Dan Bronson
- Story by: Randall Sullivan; Dan Bronson
- Directed by: William A. Graham
- Starring: Kellie Martin; Tori Spelling; Terry O'Quinn; Valerie Harper
- Music by: Chris Boardman
- Country of origin: United States
- Original language: English

Production
- Executive producers: Steve White; Dan Bronson
- Producers: Barry Bernardi; Don Goldman; Ken Raskoff
- Production locations: Westlake High School; Church of the Angels; Thousand Oaks, California
- Cinematography: Robert Steadman
- Editor: Lance Luckey
- Running time: 87 minutes
- Production company: Steve White Productions

Original release
- Network: NBC
- Release: September 26, 1994

A Friend to Die For (also known as Death of a Cheerleader in the UK and during subsequent Lifetime television airings) is a 1994 American psychological thriller television film directed by William A. Graham. Written by Dan Bronson, the film is inspired by the real-life murder of Kirsten Costas, who was killed by her classmate, Bernadette Protti, in 1984.

== Plot ==
In the fictional town of Santa Mira, California, Kevin Lane witnesses Stacy Lockwood, whom he gave a ride home, being stabbed by an unseen girl who quickly flees. Stacy is rushed to the hospital, where she later dies.

In a flashback to ten months earlier, Angela Delvecchio, a sophomore at Santa Mira High School, is determined to live up to the school’s motto of being the best. She performs well academically, attends Mass regularly, and sets high goals for herself. As the new school year commences, she aspires to be a member of the Larks, the school’s sorority, as well as a yearbook editor and a cheerleader. Most of all, she aspires to become part of the clique of wealthy, popular students led by Stacy. Angela mainly idolizes Stacy because she's the most popular girl in the school and yearns to be her friend. Both Stacy and Angela are accepted into the Larks, and Angela makes every effort to fit in, including raising money so that she can attend the school’s ski trip along with Stacy and her clique. She tries to become friends with the rich, snobbish, conceited Stacy, who rejects her. She suffers further disappointment when Stacy and the other popular girls make the cheerleading squad except for her, and she is rejected for a position on the yearbook staff, leaving her humiliated and feeling like a failure.

The events of the night of Stacy’s murder are shown from Angela’s perspective: Still determined to be friends with Stacy, Angela calls Stacy’s mother Dana and anonymously invites her to a party under the guise of there being a special dinner for the Larks. When Angela arrives at Stacy’s home, she admits the Larks’ dinner was a lie she told Dana, so she could take her to a party. Once in the car, Stacy begins questioning her about the party since she wasn't invited. When Angela mentions that she wasn't invited either, thinking she'd be accepted along with Stacy when she accompanies her to the party, an infuriated Stacy demands to be taken home and an argument ensues. Angela tries to explain how much she admires Stacy and wants to be like her to which Stacy shows no sympathy for her and coldly calls Angela pathetic and weird, upsetting her. Stacy then runs to a nearby house, where she asks to use the telephone and manages to get a ride home. Angela fears that Stacy will spread rumors about her, humiliating her in front of the entire school. She follows the car back to Stacy’s home and, in a rage, grabs a kitchen knife from the car and stabs Stacy multiple times and leaves her for dead.

Angela avoids detection in the weeks following the murder. Although she is interviewed by the police, she is not named as a suspect. Along with all of the Larks, she attends Stacy’s Funeral Mass. Most of the students put the blame for Stacy’s murder on one of their classmates, Monica Whitley, a goth girl who was frequently mocked and tormented by Stacy for her appearance; as a result, she hated Stacy and threatened to kill her on previous occasions. No one suspects Angela because she is seemingly too nice to commit the crime. Jamie Hall, Angela’s former best friend and a member of Stacy’s clique, tells her that she never really liked Stacy and was only afraid of her.

As her junior year begins, Angela becomes more involved with the community, taking up such activities as peer counselling and candy striping. Overwhelmed by Stacy’s murder, Jamie brings up the idea of disbanding Larks. Angela argues that they should remain active, noting that the group was not only important to Stacy but also to the various community activities in which they take part. Angela’s stance not only saves the Larks but also wins her the position of secretary/treasurer.

Meanwhile, a harassment campaign is waged against Monica until she finally leaves the school. At this point, authorities resume their investigation and begin re-interviewing all the alarms, including Angela. With the authorities slowly closing in on her without concrete evidence, she becomes increasingly consumed by her guilt until she finally confesses to her priest and then to her parents in a letter. Angela, accompanied by her mother, turns herself into the police and is arrested.

Devastated by the arrest, Jamie, who had gone to St. Joseph's Catholic School with Angela, confesses to their priest to having left her alone during the ski trip because she did not have the courage to stand up to Stacy. The school's principal, Ed Saxe, declares Angela a "sick kid" and that there is no problem with the school’s emphasis on materialism and success, driving away perceived blame on his influence of fierce competition. As the trial begins, the prosecutor Kwan argues that Angela should be charged with first-degree murder as there was evidence of premeditation. Angela’s lawyer claims it was second-degree murder due to her initial intention which did not involve a plot to kill, as her desire to murder Stacy developed only 20–30 seconds prior to the stabbing.

The judge agrees with the defense after listening to Angela’s taped confession and rules that, other than the tape, the rest of the evidence is just circumstantial and that the prosecution failed to prove the crime to be premeditated. Angela is then sentenced to confinement until the age of 25. Back at the church, the priest gives a homily on the community's responsibility for the death of Stacy, stating that the unrealistically high expectations of perfectionism contributed to Angela’s actions. As the movie ends, Jamie writes a letter to Angela, explaining that she plans to leave Santa Mira High School and go back to her former school, St. Joseph's. Angela is released and paroled after 7 years in prison in 1992.

== Cast ==
- Kellie Martin as Angela Delvecchio
- Tori Spelling as Stacy Lockwood
- James Avery as Agent Gilwood
- Eugene Roche as Priest
- Andy Romano as Joe Delvecchio
- Margaret Langrick as Jill Anderson
- Marley Shelton as Jamie Hall
- Kathryn Morris as Monica Whitley
- Terry O'Quinn as Principal Ed Saxe
- Valerie Harper as Mrs. Delvecchio
- Christa Miller as Teresa Delvecchio
- Brittney Powell as Head Cheerleader
- Tom O'Rourke as Dick Lockwood
- Marnie Andrews as Dana Lockwood
- Jenna Leigh Green as Meridith Ladd
- Robyn Bliley as Courtney Clay
- Michael Paul Chan as Mr. Kwan
- Christopher Hocking as Kevin Lake
- Tom Dugan as Public Defender
- Victor Raider-Wexler as Judge
- Portia Dawson as Lark Girl
- Tom Everett as Sergeant Denning (uncredited)

== Home media ==
On March 25, 2002, the film was released on Region 2 DVD as Death of a Cheerleader.

== Murder of Kirsten Costas ==
The film was inspired by the murder of Kirsten Costas. On June 23, 1984, in Orinda, California, Costas was murdered by her classmate, Bernadette Protti. Protti, who came from an affluent family, had been jealous of Costas, who was also the daughter of affluent parents and very popular at Miramonte High School. Costas had been a member of the yearbook committee and a cheerleader. However, Protti was not accepted by the yearbook committee and tried out for cheerleading, but was not picked.

On June 23, 1984, Protti lured Costas with a phony invitation to a dinner for the Bob-o-Links, a sorority-like group at school. According to Protti's later testimony, she had planned to take Costas to the party to befriend her, but Costas got angry when she was told that there was no dinner for the new "Bobbies". According to Protti, the girls quarreled, and Costas fled to the home of Alex and Mary Jane Arnold, living nearby, telling them that her friend had gone "weird". When Costas could not reach her parents by telephone, Alex Arnold drove her home, noticing that a Pinto–the Protti's family car–was following them. At the Costas home, Arnold, sitting in his car, saw Protti attack Costas. He thought that he was seeing a fist-fight but, in fact, Protti stabbed Costas five times with a kitchen knife and fled. The Costas' neighbors called an ambulance, but Costas was mortally wounded and pronounced dead at a nearby hospital.

It took the police almost six months to find Costas' killer. After Protti passed a lie detector test, her alibi went unverified. After attempting to confirm Protti's alibi and rereading her lie detector test, the police knew that the girl had lied. After speaking with an FBI agent, Protti wrote her mother a letter in which she made a full confession. Protti claimed to have found the kitchen knife by chance, and her older sister, Virginia, testified in court that she used to have that knife in her car to cut vegetables. The Costas did not believe this story – they claimed that nobody would use an 18-inch-long (460 mm) butcher knife to slice tomatoes and that Protti, casually dressed on that evening, never intended to take Kirsten to a party, but had planned to murder her. Protti was sentenced to a maximum of nine years but was released seven years later on parole.

The Costas family left Orinda and moved to Hawaii in 1986. Bernadette was released from prison in 1992 at the age of 23. Costas' parents vehemently opposed Protti's release.

== In popular culture ==
- Deadly Women is a series that airs on the Investigation Discovery channel. The "Deadly Delinquents" episode featured the Bernadette Protti and Kirsten Costas murder case.
- The documentary series Killer Kids also televised an episode, entitled "Pop and Circumstance & Shell Shocked", based on the case.

== Remake ==
In 2019, Lifetime produced a remake television film titled Death of a Cheerleader, starring Aubrey Peeples and Sarah Dugdale, with Kellie Martin also appearing.
