= Open House (2004 film) =

- Directed by: Dan Mirvish
- Starring: Hedy Burress; Ann Magnuson; Anthony Rapp; Sally Kellerman; Jenna Leigh Green; Kellie Martin
- Release date: 2004

Open House is a 2004 real estate musical film starring Hedy Burress, Ann Magnuson, Anthony Rapp, Sally Kellerman, Jenna Leigh Green, Kellie Martin, and directed by Dan Mirvish, co-founder of the Slamdance Film Festival.

Open House played on the film festival circuit in 2004–05 and was released on DVD through Wellspring Media. All the actors sang live on set rather than lip synching.

== Cast ==
- Hedy Burress – Gloria Hobbs
- James Duval – Joel Rodman
- Jerry Doyle – Dave Torkenson
- Jenna Leigh Green – Betty
- Daniel Hagen – Marvin Tibett
- Sally Kellerman – Marjorie Milford
- Ann Magnuson – Sarah Jane Tibbett
- Kellie Martin – Debbie Delaney
- Robert Peters – Ron Tucker
- Anthony Rapp – Barry Farnsworth
- Ian Whitcomb – Dr. Santee
- Branden Williams – Stanley Nasser
- Joel Michaely – Lamar
- Eddie Daniels – Colanda Jones, the Ho
- Kyle Fox – Happy McVicker
