= Murder of Kirsten Costas =

1984 murder in Orinda, California, United States

Kirsten Costas
- Born: Kirsten Marina Costas; July 23, 1968; Oakland, California, U.S.
- Died: June 23, 1984 (aged 15); Orinda, California, U.S.
- Cause of death: Stabbing
- Education: Miramonte High School
- Parents: Arthur Costas (father); Berit Costas (mother)

Kirsten Marina Costas (July 23, 1968 – June 23, 1984) was an American high school student who was murdered by her classmate Bernadette Protti in June 1984.

The daughter of Arthur and Berit Costas, Kirsten Costas and her brother, Peter, grew up in the small suburban town of Orinda, California. Costas attended Miramonte High School and was a member of the school's varsity swimming team and the cheerleading squad.

== Case ==
On June 23, 1984, Bernadette Protti told her parents she was babysitting; she borrowed the family car and drove to Costas' house after luring her with a phony invitation to a dinner for the Bob-o-Links, a sorority-like group at school. She had made an anonymous call to Costas' mother two days before to tell her about the dinner and to tell her to keep it a secret from Kirsten but to make sure she was ready. According to Protti's later testimony, she had planned to take Costas to a party to befriend her, but Costas became angry when Protti told her that she had lied about the dinner for the new "Bobbies." The girls quarreled, and Costas fled to the home of Alex and Mary Jane Arnold, telling them that her friend had gone "weird." When Costas could not reach her parents by telephone, Alex Arnold drove her to her next-door neighbor's home, noticing that the Protti family's Pinto was following them. Arnold, sitting in his car, saw Protti attack Costas at the front of the neighbor's home. He thought that he was witnessing a fistfight, but in fact Protti had stabbed Costas five times with a chef knife and fled. Upon returning home, Protti went for a walk with her mother. Bleeding profusely, Costas made her way across the street to another neighbor's house, where she said “Oh Ouch” and collapsed. The Costases' neighbors called an ambulance, but Kirsten was mortally wounded and pronounced dead at a nearby hospital.

It took the police almost six months to find Costas' killer. Protti passed a lie-detector test, but her alibi went unchecked. After attempting to confirm Protti's alibi, police discovered that she had lied. Following a conversation with an FBI agent who informed her that her arrest was imminent and that they knew that she had killed Kirsten, Protti wrote her mother a letter in which she made a full confession. Protti claimed to have found the kitchen knife by chance, and her elder sister, Virginia Varela, testified in court that she kept that knife in her car to cut vegetables. The Costas family did not believe Protti's story; they asserted that nobody would use a chef knife to slice tomatoes in a car and that Protti, casually dressed that evening, never intended to take Kirsten to a party but had planned to murder her.

== Aftermath ==
The Costas family left Orinda and moved to Hawaii in 1986.

Protti was sentenced to a maximum of nine years, but was released seven years later in 1992 on parole at the age of 23. Costas' parents vehemently opposed Protti's release.

== Adaptations ==
American filmmaker James Benning covered the aftermath of the murder in his 1987 documentary Landscape Suicide.

In 1994, the events of the story were used as inspiration for a television movie entitled A Friend to Die For (also known as Death of a Cheerleader), with Tori Spelling as Stacy Lockwood and Kellie Martin as Angela Delvecchio.

The aforementioned film was remade in 2019 as a Lifetime television movie starring Aubrey Peeples as Bridget Moretti and Sarah Dugdale as Kelli Locke, and Kellie Martin, who played Angela Delvecchio in the first television movie, playing the FBI Agent charged with tracking the murderer.

Costas' murder was featured in season 5 of Deadly Women, season 1, episode 3, of Investigation Discovery's The 1980's: The Deadliest Decade, and an episode of Killer Kids titled "Rumors & The To-Do List."
