= Michael Rogers (actor) =

Canadian actor

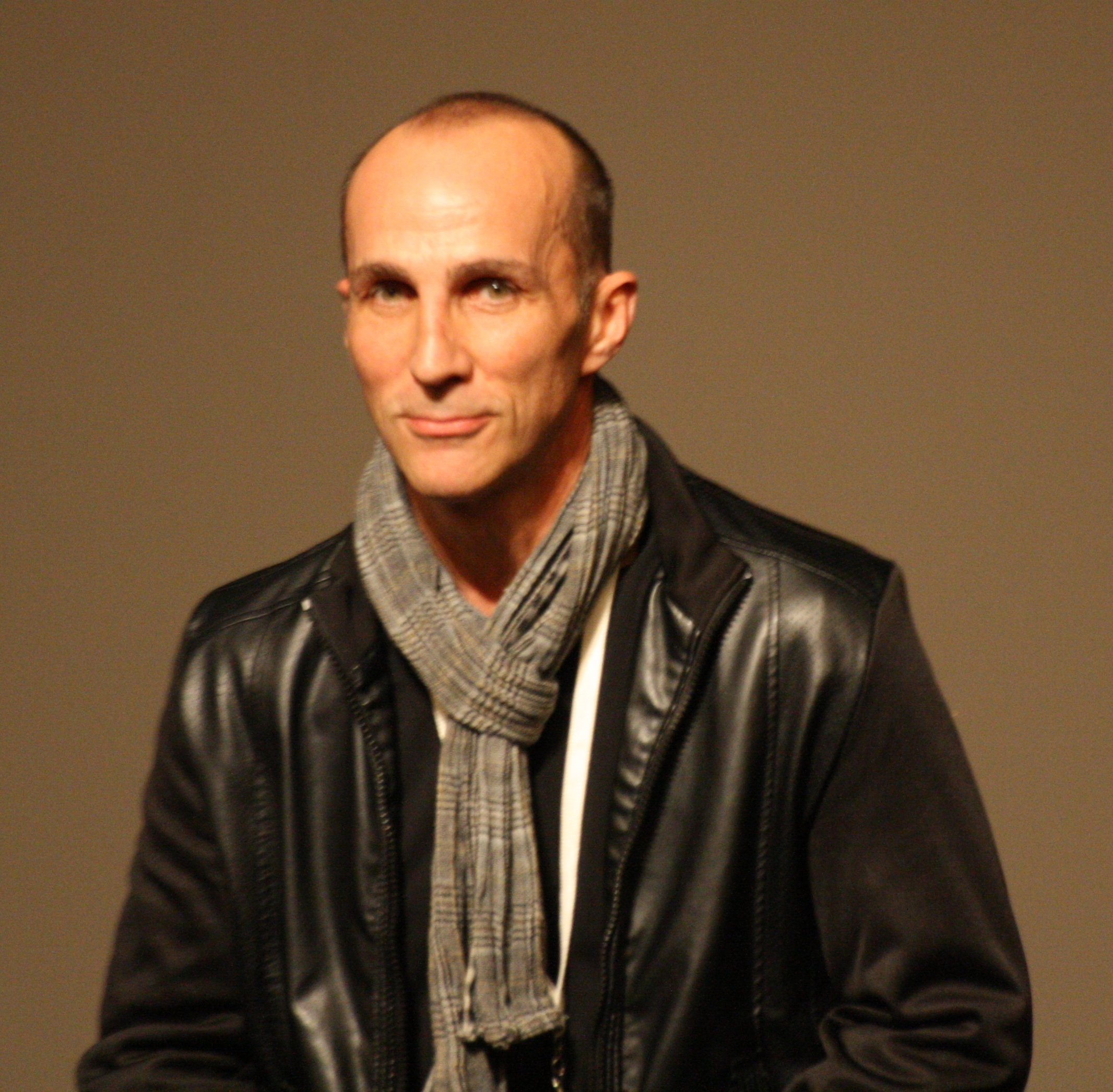
- Rogers at Utopiales sci-fi convention in France, 2011
- Occupation: Actor
- Years active: 1989–present

Michael Rogers is a Canadian film and television actor. He is known for playing the role of Barry Nyle in the film Beyond the Black Rainbow.

== Filmography ==
=== Film ===
Year	Title	Role
2022	So Cold the River	Campbell
2021	Demonic	Michael
2021	We're All Going to the World's Fair	JLB
2017	Sollers Point	Mom
2017	Hollow in the Land	Chief
2016	Interrogation	Mark Bennett
2011	Matty Hanson and the Invisibility Ray	Syd
2010	Beyond the Black Rainbow	Barry Nyle
2008	Far Cry	Mercenary Kelly
2008	Impulse	Officer Edwards
2007	The Assassination of Jesse James by the Coward Robert Ford	Onlooker at Jesse's Death
2006	Holiday Wishes	Rick Bradley
2006	Past Tense	Detective Matt
2005	Two for the Money	Stu
2004	The Thing Below	Mr. Paul
2002	The Dead Zone	Frank Dodd
2002	Hellraiser: Hellseeker	Detective Givens
2001	Children of the Corn: Revelation	Stan
2000	Duets	Earl Tulsa, Bartender
1998	2 Extra Days	Man #1
1994	For the Love of Aaron	Donald Culver
1991	The Hitman	'Sully'

=== Television ===
Year	Title	Role	Notes
2024	Sight Unseen	Bald Man	
2019	Siren	Commander David Kyle	
2018	The Blacklist	Tommy Wattles	
2017	Supergirl	Hannibal	
2016	Aftermath	Monk	
2016	Second Chance	Mellenburg	
2015	Agent X	Troy Pritchett	
2015	Blindspot	Casey Robek	
2014–2015	The 100	Denby	
2014	Supernatural	Irv	Episode 9x20: "Bloodlines"
2014	Bates Motel	Jimmy Brennan	
2013	Arrow	Sergei	
2013	Delete	Sergeant Sloan	
2013	The Killing	Guggenheim	
2013	Falling Skies	Gil Pickett	
2012	Fringe	Mueller / Interruption Observer / Interrogation Observer	5 episodes in season 5
2012	Continuum	Roland Randol	
2007	Supernatural	Gluttony	Episode 3x01: "The Magnificent Seven"
2005	The 4400	Dmitri Kazar	Episode: Weight of the World
2000	Epicenter	FBI Agent Willie	
2000	Ice Angel	Reporter Jay	
1999	The Sentinel	Actor	
1998	Stargate SG-1	Colonel John Michaels	Season 2 episode "The Gamekeeper"
1996	Badge of Betrayal	Deputy Rich	
1996	Poltergeist: The Legacy	Dawson	
1995	The X-Files	1st Crewman	Episode 2x16: "Colony"
1993	The X-Files	Lt. Griffin	Episode: 1x10 "Fallen Angel"

=== Web ===
Year	Title	Role	Notes
2017	ADAM	The Prophet	Episode 3
2011	Mortal Kombat: Legacy	Quan Chi	Episode: "Scorpion and Sub-Zero: Part 2"
2008	Battlestar Galactica: The Face of the Enemy	Brooks	5 episodes

== Awards and nominations ==
=== Awards ===
- 2013 Vancouver Film Critics Circle Awards for Best Actor in a Canadian Film - Beyond the Black Rainbow

=== Nominations ===
- 2012 New York Film Poll for Best Supporting Actor - Beyond the Black Rainbow
