= Jenna Leigh Green =

American actress and singer

- Green in 2026
- Occupations: Actress, singer
- Years active: 1994–present

Jenna Leigh Green is an American actress and singer best known for her performances as Libby Chessler on the television show Sabrina the Teenage Witch, as well as for roles on tour in the musical Wicked and later in the Broadway production.

== Early life and career ==
After graduating from Simi Valley High School, Green appeared for several seasons as Libby Chessler in the television series Sabrina, the Teenage Witch beginning in 1996. She also performed in guest spots on television shows like ER and Dharma & Greg and participated in other Nickelodeon events such as The Big Help and the game show Figure It Out.

== Theatre career and later work ==
Her Los Angeles theatre experience includes The Wizard of Oz, The Secret Garden, The Fantasticks, Romeo and Juliet, Into the Woods, and West Side Story.

In 1999, Green was cast as Ivy in Bare: A Pop Opera. She performed in the original reading for the musical as well as the original Los Angeles Productions. In 2002, she appeared in the TV movie First Shot. She also performed with the Pussycat Dolls when they were a feature burlesque show at The Roxy Theatre. In 2004, she moved to New York City where she again played Ivy in Bare during its brief off-Broadway run. In 2007, the cast album of Bare was released, featuring Green. Also in 2004, she performed in concerts and benefits with other cast members as well as on her own. She performed as Diana in a workshop of a new musical, Mask. In 2005, Green played Betty in the musical film Open House.

Green then became a cast member of the musical Wicked. She opened the role of Nessarose, on the First North American Tour, which opened March 2005. She also understudied the lead role of Elphaba, and as a result, played the role over 40 times. She exited the tour on March 5, 2006, and transferred to the Broadway production of the show, marking her Broadway debut. She reprised the role of Nessarose through December 31, 2006, before playing the role once again in the original Los Angeles production from February through December 2007. She was replaced by Marcie Dodd, who later became the Elphaba standby.

Green starred as Sally Simpson in a production of The Who's Tommy at the Ricardo Montalban Theatre in Hollywood which ran from June 18 – July 6, 2008.

In 2008, Green appeared as Violet Golding in the episode of Cold Case titled "Wednesday's Women".

On September 21, 2008, Green made her West End debut in "Never Neverland" a benefit concert that helped in aid of Ovarian cancer and NCH. The concert was at the Duchess Theatre in London. Alongside Green was fellow Wicked alumni Eden Espinosa and Scott Alan. On February 27, 2009, she guest starred on the CBS series Ghost Whisperer as Carrie in episode 4.16 "Ghost Busted". In the summer of 2010, Green appeared as Heather Chandler in the concert workshop of Heathers: The Musical.

In the fall of 2010 she appeared in the concert revue "For The Record: Quentin Tarantino" in Los Angeles, presented by ROCKLA for Show at Barre. It ran from August 12, 2010, to October 30, 2010. Also starring were Tracie Thoms, Autumn Reeser, Ty Taylor, and Audra Mae.

She appeared at Show at Barre. It opened on February 12, 2011, and closed on June 30, 2011. Also starring were Tracie Thoms, Arielle Jacobs and Kate Reinders.

In 2014 she starred in the Off-Broadway musical The Anthem. Co-starring with Green were Randy Jones, Remy Zaken, Ashley Kate Adams, and Jason Gotay. The production was directed and choreographed by Rachel Klein, with a book by Gary Morgenstein, lyrics by Erik Ransom, and music by Jonnie Rockwell. The production performed at the Lynn Redgrave Theatre in New York City.

She also appeared in a Bones episode "The Change in the Game", and in Castle in the episode "Sucker Punch".

== Filmography ==
Film and television
Year	Title	Role	Notes
1994	A Friend to Die For	Meridith Ladd	TV movie
1995	Captain Nuke and the Bomber Boys	Girl	
1996–1999	Sabrina the Teenage Witch	Libby Chessler	Seasons 1–3; Credited for 75 episodes (appearing in 46 episodes only)
1997	Friends 'Til the End	Risa	TV movie
1997	Extreme Ghostbusters	Persefineathious; Wanda	Episode: "Mole People"; Episode: "Witchy Woman"
1998	Sandman	Wanda	
1999	Cover Me	Tara Mathers	TV miniseries
2000	The Bogus Witch Project	Heather	Segment: The Bel Air Witch Project"
2001	Cover Me: Based on the True Life of an FBI Family	Tara Mathers	Episode: "Borerline Normal"
2002	Dharma & Greg	Kelly Kincaid	Episode: "She's with the Band"
2002	First Shot	Jess Hayes	TV movie
2002	ER	Tammy Gribbs	Episode: "Dead Again"
2004	Open House	Betty	
2008	Cold Case	Violet Golding	Episode: "Wednesday's Woman"
2009	Ghost Whisperer	Carrie	Episode: "Ghost Busted"
2010	Castle	Molly	Episode: "Sucker Punch"
2010	You Again	Heather	
2011	Bones	Heather	Episode: "The Change in the Game"
2012	The Outrageously Fabulous Weekly Parody Talk Show	Ensemble	Episode: "Glitz"
2012	Fifty Grades of Shay	Waitress	Short film
2014	My Eleventh	Courtney Ullman	
2015	The Residuals	Heidi	Episode: "The Dark Side"
2015	I Am Michael	Dr. O'Connor	
2016	Hard Sell	Priscilla	
2016	Are You Afraid of the 90's	Kimmie	Short film
2017	Quantico	Emily Meyers	Episode: "LNWILT"
2017	Wisco Queens	Kelly	3 episodes
2018	Skin	Rebecca Ramos	
2017	Glimpse	Pam	Episode: "Sparky"
2019	Yes	Annie Caden	
2019	The Loudest Voice	Irena Briganti	4 episodes
2021	Wild Indian	Ivy	
2021	The Survivalist	Marley Harrelson	Direct-to-video
2021	Gossip Girl	Nancy Vogel	Episode: "Blackberry Narcissus"
2021	NCIS: Hawai'i	Morgan Davenport	Episode: "Legacy"
2022	Magnum P.I.	Heather Nix	Episode: "Run, Baby, Run"
2022	Blue Bloods	Robin Pruitt	Episode: "Long Lost"
