= Remy Zaken =

American stage and television actress (born 1989)

- Born: May 9, 1989 (age 37); Norwalk, Connecticut, U.S.
- Education: Columbia University (BA)
- Occupation: Actress

Remy Zaken (born May 9, 1989) is an American stage and television actress best known for being one of the youngest cast members in the Original Broadway production of Spring Awakening at the Eugene O'Neill Theatre, playing the role of Thea. Zaken received a BA in psychology from Columbia University, after having deferred for a year in order to perform in Spring Awakening.

== Career ==
Zaken was born in Norwalk, Connecticut to a Jewish family. She has acted professionally since she was ten years old. She performed in the Original Broadway production of Spring Awakening as Thea from December 10, 2006, until January 18, 2009. She also starred in the off-Broadway production of Freckleface Strawberry as Strawberry from February 4, 2011, through the summer of 2011.

Zaken has appeared in a number of television shows, including The View, CW 11 morning news, and the Today Show for interviews pertaining to her role in Spring Awakening. Zaken also appeared in Betrayal an episode of the 2008 season of long running crime drama Law & Order as the character Amanda, and The Ex-Files, an episode of Gossip Girl on September 22, 2008.

Zaken has appeared in a number of Off-Broadway and regional productions, including the critically acclaimed A Tree Grows in Brooklyn at the Goodspeed Opera House. Zaken won the "Best Debut" award from the Connecticut Critic Circle for her performance as Francie. Additional credits include Captain Louie, Radiant Baby, and the theatre adaptation of A Little Princess by TheaterWorks at the Palo Alto Theater in California.

In November 2009, Zaken starred as her dream role Shelly in Bat Boy: The Musical at Columbia University.

In 2014 she appeared in the Off-Broadway Musical "The Anthem". Co-starring with Zaken were Randy Jones, Jenna Leigh Green, Ashley Kate Adams, and Jason Gotay. The production was directed and choreographed by Rachel Klein, with a book by Gary Morgenstein, lyrics by Erik Ransom, and music by Jonnie Rockwell. The production performed at the Lynn Redgrave Theatre in New York City.

In 2022, she took part in the HBO documentary film Spring Awakening: Those You've Known, which saw the 15 year reunion of the original cast of the musical.

In 2018, she started her own tutoring business, A's With Z, which helped middle and high school students prepare for standardized tests (SAT, ACT, SHSAT, SSAT, ISEE, TACHS, HSPT, Hunter) in order to get into their dream high schools and colleges. Due to high demand, Zaken hired a team of tutors and in January 2024 launched Andersen Education in order to reach more students.
