= Eva Bourne =

Canadian actress

- Other name: Eva Allan
- Occupation: Actress
- Years active: 2009–present

Eva Bourne is a Canadian actress. She is best known for playing Hannah in the mystery film series Garage Sale Mystery and Clara Stanton in the western drama series When Calls the Heart.

== Early life ==
Bourne grew up in Creston, British Columbia. She was encouraged to be creative by her parents. She initially began studying to be a dental assistant after high school but soon realised she wanted to become an actress. She moved to Vancouver shortly after to start her acting career.

== Career ==
Bourne made her on-screen debut in an episode of the comedy-drama series Psych where she played Mary. She made her big screen debut in Beyond the Black Rainbow, and had roles in The Big Year and the drama series Caprica. Her first big role came playing Lizzi in the crime series Dr. Death opposite Mandy Moore as her mom and Edgar Ramirez. Her biggest role so far has been playing Clara Stanton in the western drama series When Calls the Heart. She played the lead role of Lucy in the holiday film A 90's Christmas.

== Personal life ==
Bourne cites Woody Allen and Diane Keaton as her main influences. She also admires actress Emma Watson for her work in gender equality. In her spare time she likes to do yoga and listen to The Beatles classic hits.

== Filmography ==
=== Film ===
Year	Title	Role	Notes
2010	16 Wishes	Fashionista 2	
2010	Beyond the Black Rainbow	Elena	
2011	The Big Year	Birders Daughter	
2013	Words and Pictures	Catherine	
2015-2020	Garage Sale Mystery	Hannah	Appears in 14 of 16 films
2015	Princess Adventure	Witch	Short
2015	The Girl in the Photographs	Jill	
2016	Hoods	Scarlet Hood	Short
2017	Compulsion	Ellen	Short
2020	Cosmic	Jessica	Short
2023	Make Me a Match	Vivi	
2024	A 90's Christmas	Lucy	
2026	Some Girl	Nicole	

=== Television ===
Year	Title	Role	Notes
2009	Psych	Mary	Episode; The Devil Is in the Details... And the Upstairs Bedroom
2010	Caprica	Devanna	3 episodes
2011	The Haunting Hour: The Series	Hannaa	2 episodes
2012	Emily Owens, M.D.	Tracy	Episode; Emily and... the Tell-Tale Heart
2013	Motive	Kristi	Episode; Creeping Tom
2013	Falling Skies	Kim Kennedy	Episode; Collateral Damage
2013-2014	Once Upon a Time (TV series)	Princess Eva	2 episodes
2015-2021	When Calls the Heart	Clara Stanton	60 episodes
2022	Devil in Ohio	Gina Brooks	5 episodes
