= The College Admissions Scandal =

2019 American TV film

- Promotional poster
- Written by: Stephen Tolkin
- Directed by: Adam Salky
- Starring: Penelope Ann Miller; Mia Kirshner; Sam Duke; Sarah Dugdale; Robert Moloney; Catherine Lough Haggquist; Michael Shanks
- Country of origin: United States
- Original language: English

Production
- Executive producer: Gail Katz
- Running time: 87 minutes
- Production company: Varsity Films

Original release
- Network: Lifetime
- Release: October 12, 2019

The College Admissions Scandal is a 2019 TV film that aired on Lifetime as part of its "Ripped from the Headlines" feature film. The film is based on the 2019 college admissions bribery scandal and stars Penelope Ann Miller, Mia Kirshner, and Michael Shanks. It tells a fictional account of the event that involves two fictional characters.

== Premise ==
Caroline DeVere (Penelope Ann Miller) and Bethany Slade (Mia Kirshner) are two wealthy mothers. Caroline is an interior designer and Bethany owns a financial services firm. When they want their teenagers to get into an elite college, they resort to paying Rick Singer (Michael Shanks) to get them in.

== Cast ==
- Penelope Ann Miller as Caroline DeVere
- Mia Kirshner as Bethany Slade
- Michael Shanks as Rick Singer
- Sam Duke as Danny DeVere
- Sarah Dugdale as Emma Slade
- Robert Moloney as Jackson DeVere
- Catherine Lough Haggquist as Erica Valdez
- Kendra Westwood as Carla Pontrell

== Production ==
On September 5, 2019, ET Online reported that characters in the film would be depicted by actresses Mia Kirshner and Penelope Ann Miller in roles inspired by Lori Loughlin's and Felicity Huffman's involvement in the college admissions matter. Describing her role, Kirshner was quoted saying, "This story is about privilege and corruption and it's about people who don't follow the rules because they think they're above rules... My character (based on Loughlin but named "Bethany" in the film) is so corrupt, greedy, narcissistic, self-centered, and the dialogue is hilarious, so I'm glad that they're able to capture humor about this as well."

== Reception ==
The film premiered with a 719,000 viewers. On Rotten Tomatoes, the film scored a 71% based on seven reviews. On Metacritic, the film scored a 57 based on 7 critic reviews.

Gwen Ihnat of The A.V. Club gave the film a C+.
