= Kellie Martin =

American actress (born 1975)

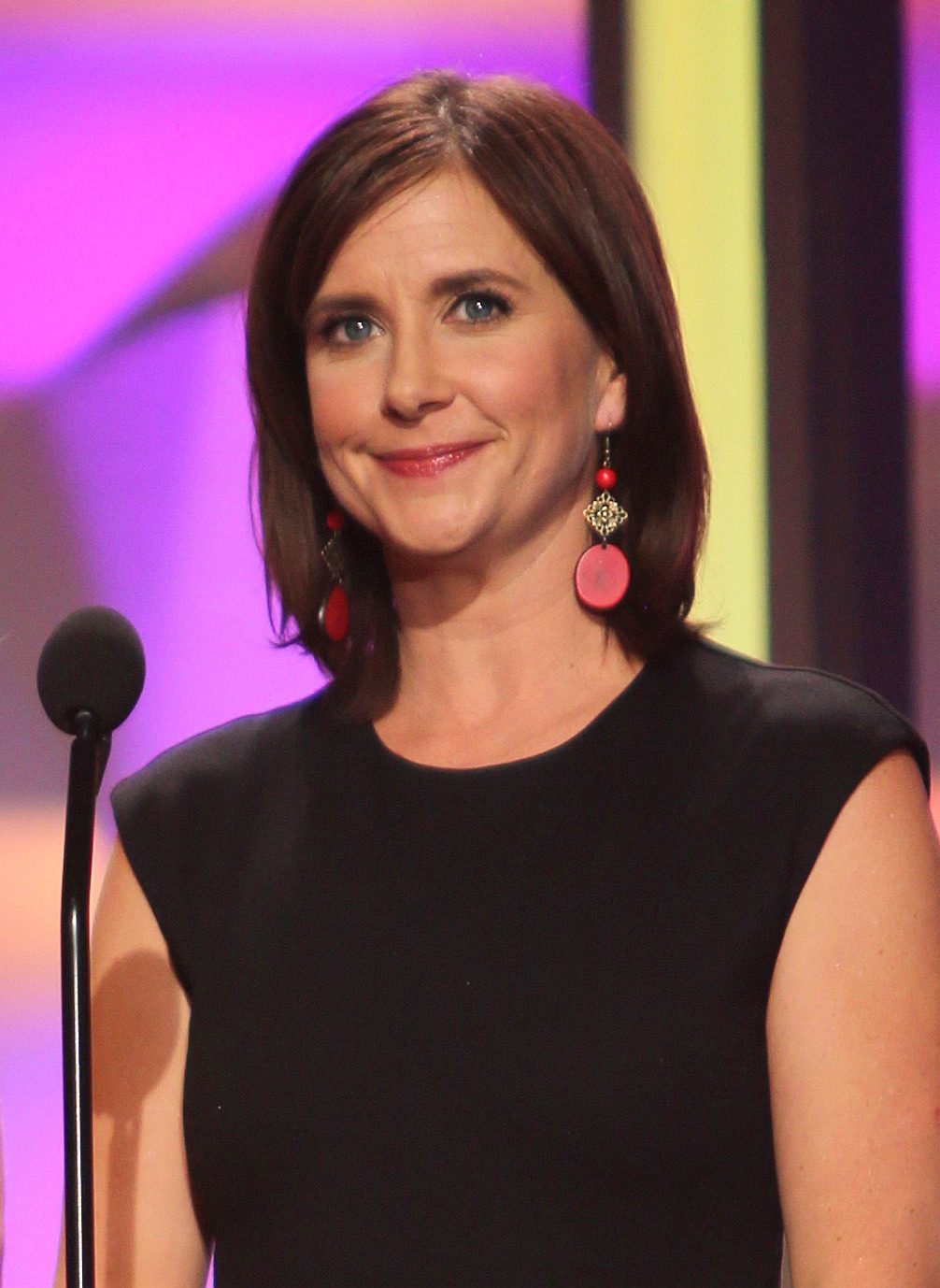
- Martin at the AHA 2014 Hero Dog Awards
- Born: Kellie Noelle Martin; October 16, 1975 (age 51); Riverside, California, U.S.
- Education: Yale University
- Occupation: Actress
- Years active: 1982–present
- Spouse: Keith Christian (m. 1999)
- Children: 2

Kellie Noelle Martin (born October 16, 1975) is an American actress. Her roles have included Lolly in Potato Head Kids, Daphne Blake in A Pup Named Scooby-Doo, Emily Coleman in Troop Beverly Hills, Becca Thatcher in Life Goes On, Molly Tazmanian Devil in Taz-Mania, Sherry in Matinee, Christy Huddleston in Christy, Sadira in Aladdin, Roxanne in A Goofy Movie, Lucy Knight in ER, Samantha Kinsey in the Mystery Woman TV film series, and as Hailey Dean in the Hailey Dean Mysteries.

== Early life ==
Martin began her acting career at age 7, when her aunt who was a nanny for actor Michael Landon's children helped her land a guest spot on the Landon-produced series Father Murphy. At the age of 11, she was a contestant during Young People's Week on the Bob Eubanks-hosted version of Card Sharks.

== Career ==
=== Early years ===
Martin had a recurring role on season three of Valerie's Family: The Hogans (1987–1988). She also contributed the voice of Daphne Blake on the animated series A Pup Named Scooby-Doo in 1988–1991. In 1989, Martin began the role of Rebecca "Becca" Thatcher on the family drama Life Goes On, which ran on ABC for four seasons. She also played the role of Emily in 1989's Troop Beverly Hills, starring Shelley Long. Martin also co-hosted the 1989 pilot of America's Funniest Home Videos alongside Bob Saget.

=== 1990s ===
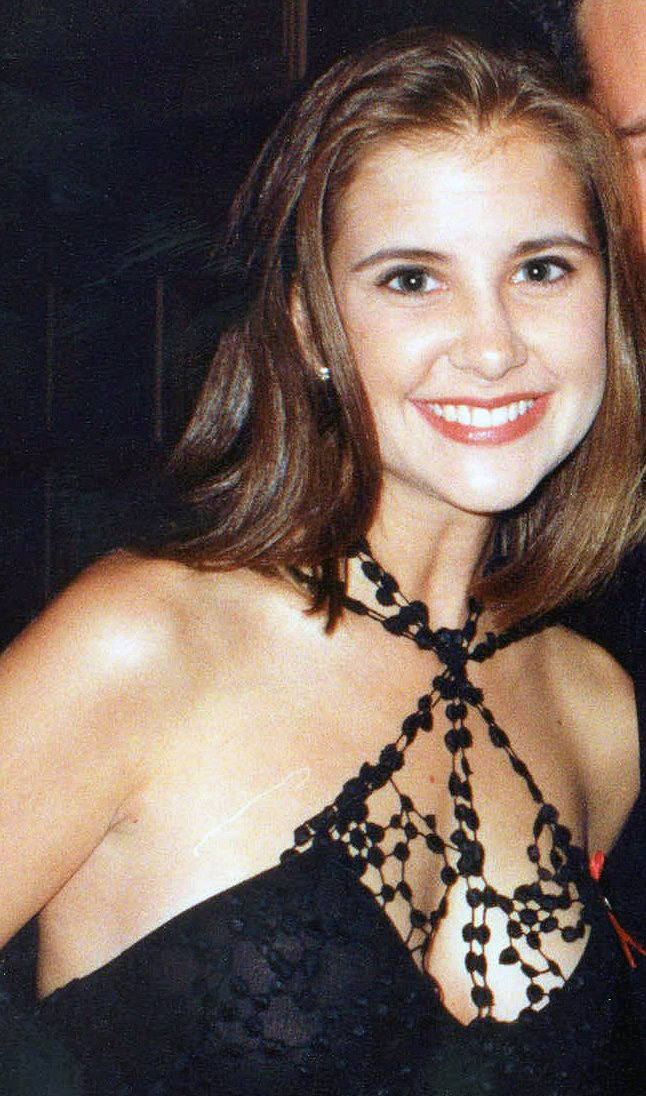
Martin in 1993

From 1991 to 1995, Martin supplied the voice of Molly Tasmanian Devil on Taz-Mania. In 1993, she played Sherry in Matinee, and made a guest appearance as Cleo Walker on an episode of seaQuest DSV titled "Brothers and Sisters".

In 1994, she starred in her own series, Christy. Also in 1994, she starred in the Lifetime film A Friend to Die For. In 1995, she starred in The Face on the Milk Carton, a TV film based on the book by Caroline Cooney about a teenager who finds out she was kidnapped from her real family 13 years prior and had been raised by the parents of her kidnapper. She was in A Goofy Movie as the voice of Roxanne, Max's love interest.

In 1996, Martin starred in the Lifetime films After the Silence and Hidden in Silence. From 1998–2000, Martin appeared on the medical drama ER as medical student Lucy Knight. Martin was still attending Yale at the time and postponed her education so that she could join the cast. When she left ER, she stopped acting for three years and returned to Yale to finish her degree in art history.

=== 2000s ===
In 2003, Martin starred in Mystery Woman, a Hallmark Channel film about the owner of a mystery bookshop who solves crimes. From 2005 to 2007, she made ten more Mystery Woman films for Hallmark, two of which she directed. Also in 2003, Martin had a supporting role on the comedic film Malibu's Most Wanted.

In 2006, she starred in the Lifetime film Live Once, Die Twice, followed by No Brother of Mine in 2007. Also in 2007, Martin provided the voice for the adult-version of Barbara Gordon on "Artifacts", an episode of The Batman.

In 2009, Martin was a guest on Grey's Anatomy, episode "No Good at Saying Sorry." She also guest starred in the Ghost Whisperer episode "Stage Fright" as Cally O'Keefe. She has guest starred on the Private Practice episode "The Way We Were".

In 2012, she played Army Captain Nicole Galassini on the Lifetime Network television series Army Wives.

In 2016, Martin began starring in a new Hallmark Movies & Mysteries Channel show Hailey Dean Mystery as the protagonist Hailey Dean who is a former prosecutor turned therapist and solves mysteries. The Hailey Dean Mysteries are based on characters from Nancy Grace's New York Times best-selling series of mystery books about Dean.

In 2017, she played police officer Kimberly Leahy in seven episodes of the TBS comedy series The Guest Book.

== Personal life ==
Martin graduated from Yale University in 2001 with a degree in art history. She was a member of the Saybrook Fellowship. She married Keith Christian on May 15, 1999, in his hometown of Polson, Montana. They have two daughters.

Martin owns and operates her own toy store and has authored a novel, Madam: A Novel of New Orleans from Plume.

== Filmography ==
=== Film ===
Year	Title	Role	Notes
1986	Jumpin' Jack Flash	Kristi Carlson	
1986	Body Slam	Missy Roberts	
1988	Doin' Time on Planet Earth	Sheila	
1989	Troop Beverly Hills	Emily Coleman	
1989	The Flamingo Kid	Lauren Brody	Short film
1993	Matinee	Sherry	
1995	A Goofy Movie	Roxanne (voice)	
2001	All You Need	Beth Sabistan Starnes	
2003	Malibu's Most Wanted	Jen	
2004	Open House	Debbie Delaney	
2004	Mickey's Twice Upon a Christmas	Mona (voice)	
2005	Thru the Moebius Strip	Allana (voice)	English dub

=== Television ===
Year	Title	Role	Notes
1982	Father Murphy	Flossie	Episode: "Sweet Sixteen"
1984	Highway to Heaven	Lisa Ratchett	Episode: "Another Song for Christmas"
1985	The Canterville Ghost	n/a	Television film
1986	Wonderful World of Disney	Linda / Veronica	2 episodes
1986	Dallas	Brenda Crane	Episode: "J.R. Rising"
1986	Life With Lucy	Patty	2 episodes
1986	Potato Head Kids	Lolly (voice)	Main cast
1987–1988	The Hogan Family	Tracy Nash	5 episodes
1987–1988	My Two Dads	Rebecca	2 episodes
1988	thirtysomething	Robin Kramer	2 episodes
1988	The Tracey Ullman Show	Kari	Episode: "2.21"
1988	ABC Weekend Specials	Karen	Episode: "Runaway Ralph"
1988	Superman	Lana Lang (voice)	Episode: "The Birthday Party"
1988	Secret Witness	Jennie Thomas	Television film
1988–1991	A Pup Named Scooby-Doo	Daphne Blake (voice)	Main cast
1989	America's Funniest Home Videos	Herself	Episode: Pilot
1989	Charles in Charge	Heather Curtis	Episode: "Adam See, Adam Do"
1989	Mr. Belvedere	Miriam	Episode: "The Election"
1989	Baywatch	Chelsea Carroll	Episode: "Panic at Malibu Pier"
1989–1993	Life Goes On	Rebecca 'Becca' Thatcher	Main role
1991–1995	Taz-Mania	Molly Tazmanian Devil (voice)	Main cast
1993	SeaQuest DSV	Cleo Walker	Episode: "Brothers and Sisters"
1993	ABC Afterschool Specials	Samantha Wheeler	Episode: "Montana Crossroads"
1994	Aladdin	Sadira (voice)	4 episodes
1994	Christy	Christy Huddleston	Television film
1994	A Friend to Die For (also known as Death of a Cheerleader)	Angela Delvecchio	Television film
1994–1995	Christy	Christy Huddleston	Lead role
1995	If Someone Had Known	Katie Liner	Television film
1995	The Face on the Milk Carton	Jennifer Sands / Janie Jessmon	Television film
1995	Her Hidden Truth	Billie Calhoun	Television film
1996	Hidden in Silence	Fusia Podgorska	Television film
1996	Her Last Chance	Alex Saxen	Television film; also co-producer
1996	After the Silence	Laura Keyes	Television film; also released as Breaking Through
1997	On the Edge of Innocence	Zoe Taylor	Television film; also co-producer
1997	Crisis Center	Kathy Goodman	Main role
1998	About Sarah	Mary Beth McCaffrey	Television film
1998–2000	ER	Lucy Knight	Main role (seasons 5 & 6)
2001	Man in the Kitchen	Unknown	Television film
2002	Fiona	Det. Fiona Fitzgerald	Television film
2003	Law & Order: Special Victims Unit	Melinda Granville	Episode: "Tragedy"
2003	Mystery Woman	Samantha Kinsey	Television film
2005	Mystery Woman: Mystery Weekend	Samantha Kinsey	Television film
2005	Mystery Woman: Snapshot	Samantha Kinsey	Television film
2005	Mystery Woman: Sing Me a Murder	Samantha Kinsey	Television film
2005	Mystery Woman: Vision of a Murder	Samantha Kinsey	Television film
2005	Mystery Woman: Game Time	Samantha Kinsey	Television film
2006	Mystery Woman: At First Sight	Samantha Kinsey	Television film
2006	Live Once, Die Twice	Nicole Lauker	Television film
2006	Mystery Woman: Wild West Mystery	Samantha Kinsey	Television film
2006	Mystery Woman: Oh Baby	Samantha Kinsey	Television film
2006	Mystery Woman: Redemption	Samantha Kinsey	Television film
2007	Mystery Woman: In the Shadows	Samantha Kinsey	Television film
2007	The Batman	Barbara Gordon / Oracle (voice)	Episode: "Artifacts"
2007	No Brother of Mine	Nina St. Clair	Television film
2009	Ghost Whisperer	Cally O'Keefe	Episode: "Stage Fright"
2009	Grey's Anatomy	Julie Zelman	Episode: "No Good at Saying Sorry"
2009	Private Practice	Michelle Larsen	Episode: "The Way We Were"
2010	Drop Dead Diva	Joan Feiner	Episode: "Senti-Mental Journey"
2010	The Jensen Project	Claire Thompson	Television film
2011	Smooch	Gwen Cole	Television film
2012	Army Wives	Army Captain Nicole Galassini	8 episodes
2012	I Married Who? or Always a Bride	Jordan Grady	Television film
2013	The Christmas Ornament	Kathy	Television film
2014	Dear Viola	Katherine	Television film; also executive producer
2014	Mad Men	Carolyn Glaspie	Episode: "Waterloo"
2014	Satisfaction	Jennifer	Episode: "...Through Self Discovery"
2015	So You Said Yes	Annabelle Blanche	Television film
2015	Hello, It's Me	Annie	Television film
2016	Hailey Dean Mystery: Murder, With Love	Hailey Dean	Television film; also executive producer
2017	Hailey Dean Mystery: Deadly Estate	Hailey Dean	Television film; also executive producer
2017	Hailey Dean Mystery: Dating Is Murder	Hailey Dean	Television film; also executive producer
2017	The Guest Book	Officer Kimberly Leahy	Main role
2018	Hailey Dean Mystery: 2+2=Murder	Hailey Dean	Television film; also executive producer
2018	Hailey Dean Mystery: A Marriage Made for Murder	Hailey Dean	Television film; also executive producer
2018	Hailey Dean Mystery: A Will to Kill	Hailey Dean	Television film; also executive producer
2019	Hailey Dean Mystery: Death on Duty	Hailey Dean	Television film; also executive producer
2019	Hailey Dean Mystery: A Prescription for Murder	Hailey Dean	Television film; also executive producer
2019	Hailey Dean Mystery: Killer Sentence	Hailey Dean	Television film; also executive producer
2019	Christmas in Montana	Sara Bradley	Television film; also executive producer
2019	Death of a Cheerleader	Agent Murray	Television film
2021	Mistletoe in Montana	—N/a	Television film; director
2022	An Amish Sin	Sara	Television film

== Awards and nominations ==
Year	Association	Category	Nominated work	Result
1990	Young Artist Awards	Best Young Actress Starring in a Television Series	Life Goes On	Won
1991	Young Artist Awards	Best Young Actress Starring in a Television Series	Life Goes On	Won
1992	Young Artist Awards	Best Young Actress Starring in a Television Series	Life Goes On	Nominated
1992	Viewers for Quality Television	Best Supporting Actress in a Quality Drama Series	Life Goes On	Won
1993	Emmy Awards	Outstanding Supporting Actress in a Drama Series	Life Goes On	Nominated
1999	Screen Actors Guild	Outstanding Performance by an Ensemble in a Drama Series	ER (shared with cast)	Won
2000	Screen Actors Guild	Outstanding Performance by an Ensemble in a Drama Series	ER (shared with cast)	Nominated
