= Sarah Dugdale =

Canadian actress

- Born: June 21, 1995 (age 31); Vancouver, British Columbia, Canada
- Occupation: Actress
- Years active: 2011–present

Sarah Dugdale (born June 21, 1995) is a Canadian actress. She is known for starring as Kelly Locke in the 2019 television film Death of a Cheerleader and for her role as Lizzie in the television series Virgin River. Dugdale also stars as Claire Tate in the Canadian television movie series Mystery 101.

== Biography ==
Dugdale was born in Vancouver, British Columbia, Canada on June 21, 1995. She is known for her portrayal of Lizzie in Virgin River. She has also had many roles in horror films including The Bad Seed, Death of a Cheerleader and There's Someone Inside Your House.

She speaks English and French.

== Personal Life ==
Dugdale engaged to actor Richard Harmon.

== Filmography ==
=== Film ===
Year	Title	Role	Notes	Ref.
2015	Glory River	Chloe Carpenter	Short film	
2016	Deuteronomy 24:16	Girlfriend	Short film	
2017	Hollow in the Land	Sophie Hinters		
2018	The Age of Adulting	Chelsea		
2019	Phil	Kara		
2019	In the Shadow of the Moon	Amy Lockhart		
2021	There's Someone Inside Your House	Katie Koons		
2023	Wonders of the Invisible World Revealed	Millie	Short film	

=== Television ===
Year	Title	Role	Notes	Ref.
2011	The Haunting Hour: The Series	Taylor Turner/Lisa	3 episodes	
2012	The Secret Circle	Kyle's Girlfriend	Episode: "Sacrifice"	
2012–2018	Supernatural	Wendy Hanscum/Chloe	2 episodes	
2014	Arrow	Becky	Episode: "Birds of Prey"	
2014	Rush	Rebecca Thomas	Episode: "Dirty Work"	
2015	Sugar Babies	Rochelle Cranston	TV movie	
2015	Stolen Daughter	Sarah Tipping	TV movie	
2015	Sorority Murder	Gabrielle	TV movie	
2015	The Hollow	Marley	TV movie	
2016	Aftermath	Sarah	3 episodes	
2017	Woman of the House	Diana	TV movie	
2017	ORENDA	Pamela Kingston	Miniseries	
2018	Ice	Hannah	Episode: "Thicker Than Water"	
2018	The Bad Seed	Chloe	TV movie	
2019	Death of a Cheerleader	Kelly Locke	TV movie	
2019	Mystery 101	Claire Tate	TV movie	
2019	Mystery 101: Playing Dead	Claire Tate	TV movie	
2019	Mystery 101: Words Can Kill	Claire Tate	TV movie	
2019	Mystery 101: Dead Talk	Claire Tate	TV movie	
2019	The College Admissions Scandal	Emma Slade	TV movie	
2020–present	Virgin River	Lizzie	Main cast; 52 episodes	
2023	Dial S for Santa	Lana Lawton	TV movie	
2024	Season's Greetings from Cherry Lane	Sarah Chen	TV movie	
2025	Allegiance	Chelsea Holleran	Episode: "Daddy Issues"	
