= Miramonte High School =

Public high school in California, United States

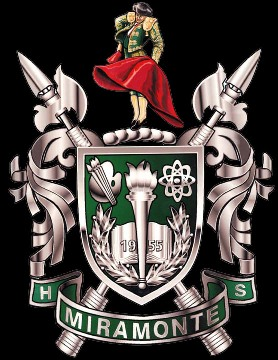
- Matador Insignia

Location
- 750 Moraga Way; Orinda, California; United States; 37.8404819°N 122.1460766°W

Information
- Type: Public high school
- Established: 1955; 71 years ago
- CEEB code: 052282
- Principal: Bill Schloss
- Enrollment: 1,168 (2025-2026)
- Colors: Green, white, and silver
- Mascot: Matador
- Newspaper: The Mirador
- Yearbook: La Mirada
- Website: mhs.acalanes.k12.ca.us

Miramonte High School is a four-year public high school located in Orinda, California, United States. It is part of the Acalanes Union High School District. The school has a college-preparatory program, with 23 Advanced Placement courses offered.

== History ==
Miramonte was founded in 1955, and welcomed approximately 175 students in September of that year. The third school in the district, MHS was built in an old pear orchard off of Moraga Way, south of the Orinda Crossroads.

The initial construction of Miramonte High School was completed by Pacific Coast Builders of San Francisco, whose bid of $559,100 was accepted by the Acalanes High School District Board of Trustees in September 1954. The site originally included 10 classrooms, a gymnasium, boys' and girls' locker rooms, a paved driveway, a paved outdoor athletic field and track, and a parking area.

== Athletics ==
Miramonte football recorded their first NCS CIF championship in 1981, defeating San Lorenzo 23–7 in the Oakland Coliseum.

In 1983, the Miramonte Matadors, known as the Mats, were voted CIF State Champions in all divisions after defeating Cardinal Newman High School on December 3, 1983, at Oakland–Alameda County Coliseum in the NCS 2A Championship game. The Mats were also NCS 2A South Champions and FAL Champions.

In 1997, the Mats again won the NCS 2A Championship after defeating Granada High School in the championship game at the Oakland Coliseum. The Mats also won NCS 2A titles in 1998, 2000, 2001 and 2003 in their victory over San Lorenzo in a rematch of their 1981 championship game.

In 2013, after finishing 2nd in the DFAL, the Mats defeated Tennyson, Northgate and number two-seeded Clayton Valley Charter to reach the championship at Rancho Cotate High School against 13–0 Casa Grande. In the game, Miramonte scored two touchdowns in the last two minutes to win their 8th NCS football championship, 42–28 to finish 12–2 on the season.

In 2008–09, Miramonte's water polo team was named "2008-09 ESPN RISE Magazine Boys' Team of the Year" (includes all sports). Since 1967, the team has won 15 NOR CAL championships and 26 League Championships. The so-called "Dream Team" were the California State Champions that year.

== Academics ==
In 2012, U.S. News & World Report ranked Miramonte High School as #21 in California and #126 in the United States in their rankings of the Best High Schools.

In 2021, Miramonte was ranked 571 nationally, and slipped from the top school in the county to third place. For their 2023-2024 Best High Schools Rankings (released in August of 2023) U.S. News & World Report ranked Miramonte as #217 nationally, and second in the county.

As of March 2014, Miramonte ranked 11th on the Los Angeles Times California Schools Guide Top Average SAT Scores list.

== Demographics ==
Total students, 2023-2024 school year: 1188

- Students by gender:

55% female
45% male

- Students by ethnicity

0.9% Black/African American
8.7 % Hispanic
21.1% Asian
60% White/Caucasian

- Student to teacher ratio: 21:1

Census Day Enrollment 2017-18 2018-19 2019-20 2020-21 2021-22 2023-2024 Total 1,316 1,286 1,236 1,174 1,183 1,188

== Notable alumni ==
- Drew Anderson, NFL quarterback
- Bryan Barker, NFL player, Class of 1982
- Chris Bauer, film, TV and stage actor, Class of 1984
- Drew Bennett, NFL player
- Kirsten Costas, murder victim
- Ken Dorsey, NFL quarterback and coach
- Paul Hackett, former college football head coach, NFL assistant coach
- Valerie Henderson, professional soccer player
- Sabrina Ionescu, WNBA player, Class of 2016
- Brett Jackson, former professional baseball player
- Drew Jackson, professional baseball player
- Mike MacDonald, rugby player
- Mia Mastrov, basketball player
- Philip Perry, lawyer, married to Liz Cheney, daughter of Dick Cheney who served as the 46th vice president of the United States from 2001 to 2009 under President George W. Bush
- Heather Petri, Olympic water polo medalist
- Luke Sassano, soccer player
- Nicolle Wallace (née Devenish), political commentator, former White House Communications Director
- Megan Reid, soccer player
- Drew Holland, water polo player and current coach, Class of 2013
