= Ming Sen Shiue =

Taiwanese-American murderer (born 1950)

- Born: October 15, 1950 (age 76); Taiwan
- Known for: Murder of Jason Wilkman, the kidnapping of Mary Stauffer and her daughter Elizabeth Stauffer.
- Status: Incarcerated
- Motive: Kidnapping: Obsession with Mary Stauffer, love and hate for her Wilkman's murder: Witness elimination
- Convictions: Federal; Kidnapping; Minnesota; Second degree murder Kidnapping
- Penalty: Federal; Life imprisonment Minnesota; 40 years imprisonment

Details
- Victims: Jason Wilkman, 6
- Injured: Mary Stauffer (multiple rapes, stabbed)
- Weapons: Metal rod, knife
- Imprisoned at: FMC Rochester

Ming Sen Shiue (Chinese: 薛明升; pinyin: Xuē Míngshēng; born October 15, 1950) is a Taiwanese-American murderer, kidnapper, stalker, and rapist convicted of the murder of six-year-old Jason Wilkman, the kidnapping of Mary Stauffer and her daughter Elizabeth, and multiple counts of rape of Mary Stauffer.

== Early life ==
Ming Sen Shiue was born on October 15, 1950, in Taiwan. When he was eight years old, he moved to Minnesota, United States, with his mother and his two siblings: his father, who died three years later, was a professor at the University of Minnesota. Shiue was described as violent toward his younger siblings, often beating them during both adolescence and adulthood.

In his teen years, Shiue was reportedly engaged in criminal activity, such as starting fires at the apartments of three strangers and throwing rocks at vehicles. For his role in the arsons, he was ordered to participate in psychotherapy at the age of 14.

According to his mother's testimony, Shiue often lied and was persistent about being right, was uncontrollable as a child, took no responsibility for his physical behavior, and caused her to be fearful. She described him as someone having "no feelings, like a dog".

From 1965 to 1966, Shiue attended Alexander Ramsey High School in Roseville, where he came to have a "crush" on his ninth-grade algebra teacher Mary Stauffer.

He later confessed during proceedings that due to his "infatuation", Shiue began sexually fantasizing about the teacher. Shiue later wrote stories about his fantasies with fictional characters from movies and eventually about Stauffer, which included consensual sex, rape and gang rape. In later years, after he realized that he did not find complete satisfaction from his fantasies, Shiue decided to kidnap Stauffer.

At the time of the kidnapping, Shiue lived at 1960 N. Hamline Avenue in Roseville, and owned a small electronics repair business.

== Kidnapping and murder ==
In 1975, Shiue located what he erroneously believed to be Stauffer's residence in Duluth. He broke into the house with a firearm intending to kidnap the victim, who did not live in the residence. He forced her in-laws, who owned the house, to the ground, tied them up, and threatened to kill them if they reported the crime. Because of this, the home invasion was not reported until the actual kidnapping of Stauffer took place five years later. As Shiue continued his search for Stauffer during the intervening period, Stauffer lived with family in the Philippines, where she and her husband worked as Christian missionaries. They returned to Minnesota in 1979.

A year later, Shiue learned that Stauffer lived at the Bethel University campus and began stalking her. On May 16, 1980, Shiue tracked Stauffer down to a beauty salon in Roseville. When Stauffer left the salon, Shiue kidnapped her and her eight-year-old daughter, Elizabeth, at gunpoint. He tied them up and threw them into the trunk of Stauffer's vehicle. During the trip to his house, where he intended to keep his victims hostage, Shiue stopped twice because Mary and Elizabeth were making noises. When he stopped for the second time, a six-year-old boy, Jason Wilkman, approached the vehicle to see what was happening. Shiue grabbed the boy and forced him into the trunk. He then drove to the isolated Carlos Avery Wildlife Refuge in Anoka County, removed the boy from the trunk and beat him to death with a metal rod.

== Rapes ==
Shiue drove Stauffer and Elizabeth to his house and locked them in a narrow closet. He then proceeded to take Stauffer out of the closet and tied her to the furniture. Shiue talked to her for hours on the night of the kidnapping, disclosing who he was, before he repeatedly raped her. He recorded the conversations and rapes on his video camera. When Shiue told Stauffer he was her student fifteen years prior, he indicated she had given him a B− grade in Algebra which prevented him from going to college. He said, as a result, he was drafted into the Vietnam War and became a POW. This was, as were many of his claims, not true. While kept at his house, the victims were often separated by Shiue. He placed Elizabeth in a box in his van for eight hours when he was at work, while her mother was left locked in a closet at his residence. Furthermore, Shiue told Stauffer he would kill her husband and son if they ever tried to escape.

== Arrest and imprisonment ==
On July 7, 1980, after Shiue left for work, Stauffer managed to remove the hinge pin from the locked closet door. Despite being chained to each other, Mary and Elizabeth were able to reach the phone in the kitchen and call law enforcement. After making the call, they ignored the dispatcher's instructions to remain inside the house, because they were too scared of Shiue to stay, and knowing that he could be home any minute. They hid behind a car parked along the street at Shiue's residence until a police officer walked over with his gun drawn, expecting it to be Shiue hiding. Shiue was arrested at his business on the same day. He was taken to Ramsey County Adult Detention Center. While in jail, he offered $50,000 to another inmate, Richard Green, to help him escape from jail, and kill Stauffer and her daughter to prevent them from testifying against him in court. Green communicated the information to the FBI.

== Trial and sentencing ==
Shiue underwent two trials. The first trial took place in 1980 and concerned the abduction of Mary and Elizabeth Stauffer and the rape of Mary. Due to Shiue taking his captives over state lines in an RV while he attended a work conference in Illinois, the crime became a federal case under the Federal Kidnapping Act. He was found guilty and sentenced to life in prison. Because the federal government still had parole at the time, he became eligible for parole after 10 years, and eligible for mandatory release after 30 years. Under the old law, federal lifers had to be released after 30 years unless they were proven to be a danger to society. However, the judge recommended that Shiue serve the full 30 years.

Shiue's second trial began in 1981. During the trial, Shiue smuggled a knife into the courtroom and, when Stauffer testified, he jumped over the table and attacked her, managing to cut her face. It took 62 stitches to close her facial wound. At the same time, Shiue promised to kill her and her daughter when he would be released from prison. Psychological evaluations of the defendant showed no signs of mental illness. When the second trial ended, Shiue was sentenced to 40 years for the murder charge, to be served concurrently with his previous thirty-year sentence. He avoided a first degree murder charge by agreeing to divulge the location of Wilkman's body.

Shiue became eligible for mandatory release on July 6, 2010, but was denied. On September 28, 2010, the Anoka County District Judge Jenny Walker Jasper ruled that Shiue could be detained indefinitely as a dangerous sexual predator even if he is granted parole. He was also found to have a sexual psychopathic personality. Shiue, who had never sought sex offender treatment in prison, apologized and begged for Mary's forgiveness during the hearing, saying she had every right to hate him. Elizabeth hoped that Shiue's apology was genuine, but thought he was too dangerous to ever be freed. Shiue appealed the ruling declaring him a dangerous sexual predator, but this was denied.

As of 2016, the United States Parole Commission has repeatedly denied Shiue's requests for release.

== In popular culture ==
The kidnapping of the Stauffers and the murder of Wilkman were described in Eileen Bridgeman Biernat's book, Stalking Mary. The kidnapping is also the focus of "High School Revenge," an episode of the series Your Worst Nightmare on the cable channel Investigation Discovery. The case was also covered by Casefile True Crime Podcast on May 6, 2017.

Lifetime produced a movie of the case, titled Abducted: The Mary Stauffer Story. It stars Alyson Hannigan as Mary Stauffer, Daphne Hoskins as Elizabeth Stauffer, and Howie Lai as Ming Sen Shiue. It was first broadcast on October 5, 2019.

== See also ==
- Brian Dugan
- David Edward Maust
- Caryl Chessman, American convicted kidnapper and rapist executed under statutes of the Federal Kidnapping Act.
