= Abducted: The Mary Stauffer Story =

2019 American television film

- Written by: Michael Vickerman
- Screenplay by: Jim Donovan
- Starring: Alyson Hannigan; Howie Lai; Daphne Hoskins; Daniel Nemes; Miles Phoenix Foley
- Country of origin: United States
- Original language: English

Production
- Executive producer: Michael Vickerman
- Running time: 87 minutes
- Production company: Stalking Productions

Original release
- Network: Lifetime
- Release: October 5, 2019

Abducted: The Mary Stauffer Story is a 2019 American television film that aired on Lifetime as part of its "Ripped from the Headlines" feature film series. The film stars Alyson Hannigan, Howie Lai, Daphne Hoskins, Daniel Nemes, and Miles Phoenix Foley. It is based on the true story of the Kidnapping of Mary and Elizabeth Stauffer at the hands of Ming Sen Shiue.

== Plot ==
Mary Stauffer and her daughter, Beth, are abducted at gunpoint by Mary's former student Ming Sen Shiue while leaving a salon in 1980. A boy named Jason sees the abduction and Ming forces him into the trunk of Mary's car along with Mary and Beth. It is later revealed that Ming kills him. Ming then locks Mary and Beth in a closet in his house where he threatens to kill the rest of the family should they try to escape or get help. He forces Mary regularly to do video interviews.

On her birthday, Ming rapes Mary and then video interviews her, asking if she is enjoying her birthday. She tells him she can't when she has been raped. This upsets Ming who says he was making love to her but she wasn't making love to him. Mary says she can't do that while she is married to her husband. Ming asks her to make love to him like she does to her husband, calling out his name. This makes Mary ask if he had been listening to her family and if he has been in her house.

Back at Mary's house, her husband Irv discovers that someone broke the basement window. There are dirty shoe prints under it, and a small hole in the floor of their bedroom. He notifies police Sgt. Wyatt Rayburn, who suggests someone familiar with electronics may have been eavesdropping on them. Police suggest examining Mary's old school yearbooks in case it was someone she knew through school.

When Ming leaves the next day, Mary and Beth hear the door open and then hear noise in the kitchen. They pretend to be asleep and then hear music coming from the basement. When he returns home later, Beth asks if he is keeping someone else in the basement. Ming explains that it's his cousin, Brian but there is an extra layer of padding on the floor in the closet so Brian can't hear Mary and Beth.

At 30 days, Mary's voice narrates saying that what kept her going was hope and her daughter's love. She would do anything to keep her daughter safe.

Ming he has been invited to attend a conference in Chicago and rented an RV to take his victims with him. They begin the journey to Chicago in the RV. Mary and Beth are tied to gas line through the floor. If they pull too hard, it will explode. Ming tells them he has installed listening devices and if they yell out to anyone, he will kill as many people as possible. Mary tries to whisper for help to some skateboarders, but they don't take her seriously.

At day 45, they return to Ming's home. His cousin is gone so they can come out of the closet. Because they have been good, they can have the bedroom to themselves. On Father's Day, Ming lets Beth call Irv. She tells him she and mommy are okay, but she doesn't know when she's coming home. Irv asks to speak to the man holding them, but Ming tells Beth no.

One day he finds Beth outside the room looking for a bathroom. He becomes enraged and ties them to a door in the room. On Day 53, Mary decides to pull the door they are tied to off its hinges. Mary calls the police from the kitchen phone, then leads Beth outside where they hide behind the RV until the police arrive. The police arrest Ming at his place of work. When Mary tells law enforcement that they were taken to Chicago, the FBI gets involved in the case. Mary and Beth reunite with Irv and their son Steven at the police station.

A postscript reveals that Ming Sen Shiue was sentenced to life in prison and was denied parole in 2016. Authorities found Jason's body during the investigation. Mary and Irv Stauffer are still married and Elizabeth Stauffer now has children of her own.

== Cast ==
- Alyson Hannigan as Mary Stauffer
- Howie Lai as Ming Sen Shiue
- Daphne Hoskins as Elizabeth Stauffer
- Daniel Nemes as Irv Stauffer
- Miles Phoenix Foley as Steven Stauffer
- Karly Warkentin as Sarah
- Reese Alexander as Sgt. Wyatt Rayburn
- Harper Postma as Jason
- Ronald Patrick Thompson as Deputy Taylor
- Bronwen Smith as Kris Dunlap
- Laura Di Cicco as Jason's mother
- Corina Akeson as Ann
- Serge Jaswal as Robert
- Kai Donily as a teenage boy
- Caroline Chan as June
- Paralee Cook as a female deputy
- Colin Corrigan as State Patrol Officer No. 1
- Fiona Forbes as a reporter
- Matthew Graham as a reporter
- Sean Kennedy as State Patrol Officer No. 2
- Ash Lee as Brian
- Lionel Marye as Sarah's husband
- Rhonda Rees as Deputy Knowles
- Jake T. Roberts as Sheriff Decker
- Kai Shaw as Trevor
- Jordan Waunch as a police officer

== Reception ==
The movie had 1.04 million viewers during its first airing.
