= Death of a Cheerleader (2019 film) =

2019 American television film

- Poster
- Based on: Death of a Cheerleader by Randall Sullivan
- Screenplay by: Caitlin D. Fryers; Dan Bronson
- Story by: Randall Sullivan; Dan Bronson
- Directed by: Paul Shapiro
- Starring: Aubrey Peeples; Morgan Taylor Campbell; Sarah Dugdale; Madelyn Grace; MacKenzie Cardwell; Kirsten Robek; P. Lynn Johnson; Chris William Martin; Lane Edwards; Lucia Walters; Kellie Martin
- Music by: Graeme Coleman
- Country of origin: United States
- Original language: English

Production
- Producer: Michael O'Connor
- Cinematography: Toby Gorman
- Editor: Mark Shearer
- Running time: 84 minutes

Original release
- Network: Lifetime
- Release: February 2, 2019

Death of a Cheerleader is a television film that aired on Lifetime on February 2, 2019 and starring Aubrey Peeples, Morgan Taylor Campbell, Sarah Dugdale, Madelyn Grace, MacKenzie Cardwell and Kellie Martin. The film is a remake of the 1994 television film A Friend to Die For, based on the murder of Kirsten Costas, and has Martin appearing in a different role than in the 1994 version.

== Plot ==
Bridget Moretti is a shy high school student who befriends Kelly Locke, the leader of the clique of popular girls known as the Bobettes. Despite this newfound popularity, Bridget experiences a number of other social setbacks and begins to spiral. After being romantically rejected by Kelly, Bridget snaps and stabs her to death.

The movie follows the events around the school and community as an FBI agent attempts to piece together what happened to Kelly and Bridget's guilt over her violent action grows.

== Cast ==
- Aubrey Peeples as Bridget Moretti
- Morgan Taylor Campbell as Nina Miller
- Sarah Dugdale as Kelly Locke
- Madelyn Grace as Trish Doyle
- MacKenzie Cardwell as Judy
- Kirsten Robek as Betty Locke
- P. Lynn Johnson as Margo Moretti
- Chris William Martin as Sheriff Randall
- Lane Edwards as Dale Locke
- Lucia Walters as Mrs. Lockwood
- Kellie Martin as Agent Veronica Murray
- Milo Shandel as Principal Simmons
- Alison Rayne as Mia Miller
- Ken Tremblett as John Shelly
- James Drew Dean as Eli

== Production ==
Kellie Martin played the role of Angela, the murderous high school student, in the original 1994 film, and the role of the FBI agent was rewritten as a woman specifically with Martin in mind to play the character in the 2019 remake.
