= Marilyn Norry =

Canadian actress

Marilyn Norry is a Canadian actress performing on stage across Canada and in films and television around the world. Her credits include The L Word, Flight 93, and Stargate SG-1.

She played the evil mother in the movie “The Bad Son” in 2007.
