= Heinz-Wilhelm Eck =

German navy officer and World War II U-boat commander (1916–1945)

- Born: 27 March 1916; Hamburg, German Empire
- Died: 30 November 1945 (aged 29); Hamburg, Allied-occupied Germany
- Cause of death: Execution by firing squad
- Military career
- Allegiance: Germany
- Branch: Kriegsmarine
- Service years: 1934–1945
- Rank: Kapitänleutnant
- Units: 4th U-boat Flotilla; 12th U-boat Flotilla
- Commands: U-852, 15 June 1943 – 3 May 1944

Heinz-Wilhelm Eck (27 March 1916 – 30 November 1945) was a German U-boat commander of the Second World War who was tried, convicted, condemned and executed after the war for ordering his crew to shoot the survivors of a Greek merchantman sunk by U-852.

== Service history ==
Eck was born in Hamburg and served with the Kriegsmarine from 1934, becoming a Kapitänleutnant on 1 December 1941 and assuming his first command on 15 June 1943. From 18 January 1944 he led U-852 on a patrol heading for South African waters and then on to the Indian Ocean. While en route he encountered the lone Greek steamer SS Peleus, and sank her with two torpedoes on 13 March.

=== Peleus affair ===
The sinking Peleus left a large debris field, amongst which were several survivors clinging to rafts and wreckage. This debris could betray the presence of the U-852 to enemy aircraft and shipping patrolling the area. Eck decided to sink the wreckage with hand grenades and automatic weapons. The question of whether this "dispersal" order explicitly or implicitly encouraged the killing of the sailors in the water, or whether this was an unfortunate example of collateral damage, was the subject of a post-war trial. During the trial, Eck acknowledged he realized that by sinking the rafts, he was denying the seamen a chance of survival.

Eck ordered his junior officers to fire into the wreckage in an effort to sink it. Accounts differ greatly as to the number of shots fired and the damage done. The two surviving Greek sailors reported the shooting went on for a long time, and that at least four of their compatriots were killed by it. The German crew's report stated, however, that they had fired several short machine gun bursts into the wreckage and were unable to see their targets in the dark. The men shooting were later proven to be the ship's engineering officer, Hans Lenz (who claimed he had done so under protest to spare an enlisted man from having to do it), Walter Weisspfennig (the ship's doctor who was not supposed to be handling firearms), the second in command August Hoffmann, and an enlisted engineer, Wolfgang Schwender (who was under direct orders and fired very few rounds). Eck was also present during the incident; the remaining crew were below decks.

The operation to sink the rafts and wreckage was not successful, but the submarine was able to evade pursuit, and managed to sink the British merchant ship SS Dahomian off Cape Town on 1 April, this time hastily leaving the scene rather than pausing. A few weeks later on 30 April the boat was spotted by a Vickers Wellington bomber flying from Aden, which managed to damage her with depth charges, thus preventing her from diving. Eck went to the Somali coast and beached U-852 on a coral reef while under attack from six bombers of 621 Squadron Royal Air Force. Of Eck's crew of 65, seven were killed and the remaining 58 made it to shore. They were captured by the Somaliland Camel Corps and local militia and sent to prison camps to await the end of the war.

=== Post-war trial ===
In prison, Lenz provided his captors with a signed confession. This, when combined with the testimony of the Peleus survivors and the log of U-852 (which Eck had failed to destroy), provided conclusive testimony. Following the war's conclusion, all the above named crew members were placed on trial at the Hamburg war trials (an extension of the Nuremberg trials for less prominent war criminals) for the deaths of the steamer's crew. The judge was Melford Stevenson. After a four-day hearing, at which crew members, survivors and experts were called, all five men were found guilty.

Eck, Hoffmann, and Weisspfennig were sentenced to death. Weisspfennig was condemned because as a non-combatant under the Geneva Conventions, he was prohibited from firing weapons even in action. Eck and Hoffmann were executed because in their roles as the boat's senior officers, responsibility for the actions of their crew, as well as their own, fell directly on their shoulders. All three were shot by firing squad at Lüneburg Heath on 30 November 1945. Lenz, due to his protests and his written confession, received a life sentence, while Schwender, the only man involved who had been under direct orders, was sentenced to 15 years in prison. Schwender was released from prison on 21 December 1951; Lenz was released on 27 August 1952.

The incident was the only case in which Kriegsmarine U-boat personnel were convicted of war crimes during the Second World War, compared to the thousands of individuals from the other branches of the Wehrmacht.

=== Popular fiction ===
Gwyn Griffin's best-selling 1967 novel An Operational Necessity is based on the Peleus incident.

== See also ==
- Dudley W. Morton
- Anthony Miers
- Battle of the Bismarck Sea
- Naval Battle of Guadalcanal

== Bibliography ==
- Busch, Rainer; Röll, Hans-Joachim (1999). German U-boat commanders of World War II : a biographical dictionary. Translated by Brooks, Geoffrey. London, Annapolis, Md: Greenhill Books, Naval Institute Press. ISBN 1-55750-186-6.
- Cameron, John (ed.), Trial of Heinz Eck, August Hoffmann, Walter Weisspfennig, Hans Richard Lenz and Wolfgang Schwender (The Peleus Trial). William Hodge & Co., 1948. War Crimes Trials series.
- Sharpe, Peter (1998). U-Boat Fact File. Great Britain: Midland Publishing. ISBN 1-85780-072-9.
- Savas, Theodore P., editor. (1997, 2004). Silent Hunters: German U-boat Commanders of World War II. Naval Institute Press and Savas Publishing Company. (Includes long essay on Eck with extensive discussion of the trial testimony and his actions, by Dwight Messimer.)
- Dwight R. Messimer: Heinz-Wilhelm Eck - Siegerjustiz and the Peleus Affair. In: Silent Hunters: German U-boat Commanders of World War II. Da Capo Press 1997. ISBN 978-1882810178, pages 137ff
