= Ein Shemer =

Ein Shemer: עֵין שֶׁמֶר (Hebrew)
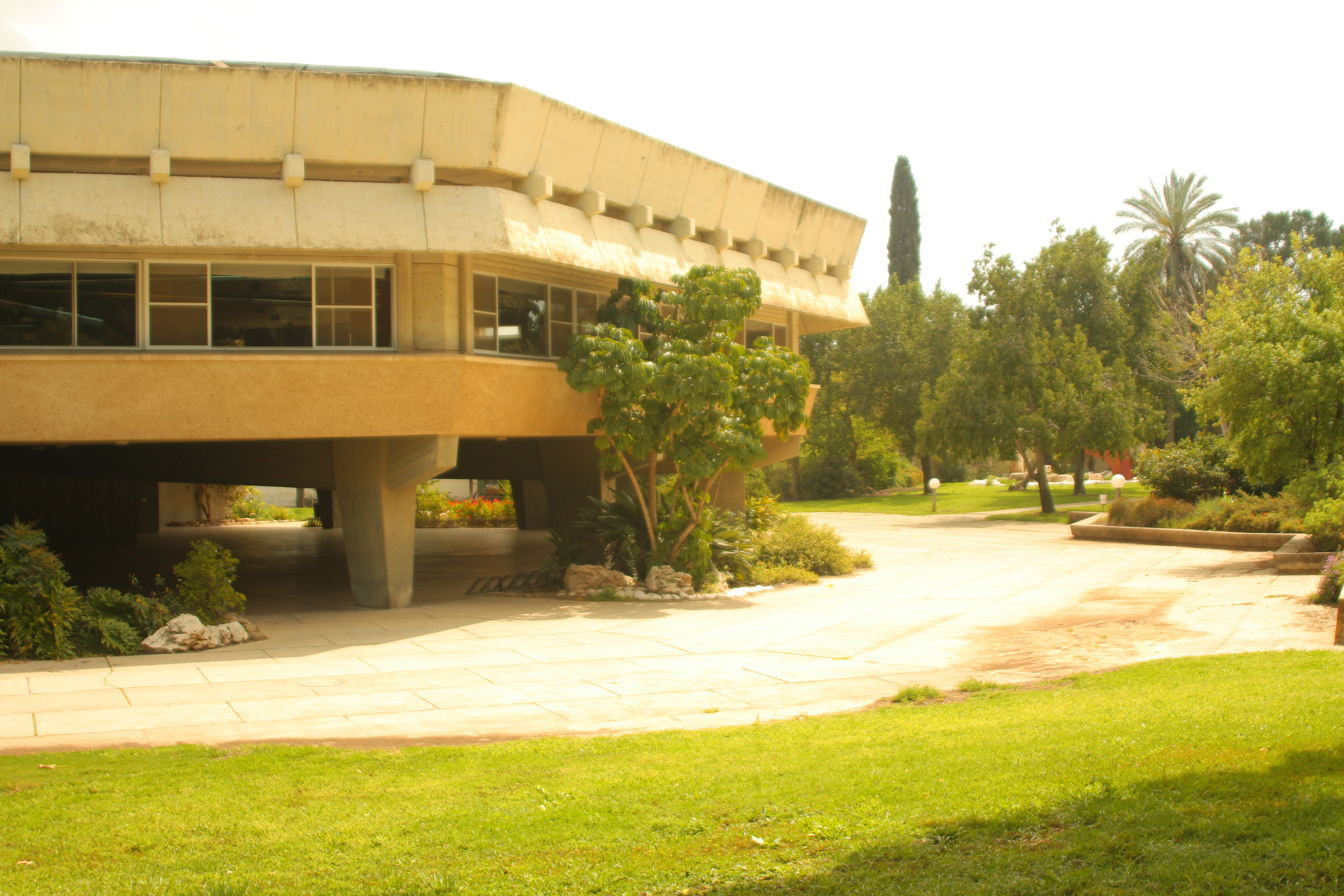

- Location within Haifa region of Israel Location within Israel
- Coordinates: 32°27′41″N 35°0′24″E
- Country: Israel
- District: Haifa
- Subdistrict: Hadera
- Council: Menashe
- Affiliation: Kibbutz Movement
- Founded: 1927
- Founder: Polish Hashomer Hatzair members
- Population (2024): 920
- Website: www.ein-shemer.com

Ein Shemer is a kibbutz in northern Israel. Located in the Shomron region to the south of Route 65, about 6 km northeast of Hadera, it falls under the jurisdiction of Menashe Regional Council. In 2024, it had a population of 920.

== Etymology ==
Ein – Because the founders of the kibbutz originally belonged to a gar'in group named Ein Ganim and because of their aspiration to find a spring of water [ma'ayan – ayin – ein] on the land – which eventually came to pass. Shemer – because members of HaShomer group set up a guard post on the spot, because the kibbutz founders belonged to HaShomer HaTzair youth group and because the kibbutz is situated within the area of the Biblical kingdom of Shemer, king of the Shomron.

== History ==
=== Ottoman era ===
In 1913 a small group of young Jews belonging to the HaShomer (Watchmen's) organization chose to establish a guard post near the entrance to Wadi 'Ara, which would also serve as a way station for travelers between the Mediterranean coast and the Galilee. From then on, the place was inhabited on-and-off by a few groups of pioneers, each of which was driven away by the harsh conditions – malaria, lack of water (until 1935, water had to be brought in by horse and cart from nearby Karkur), remoteness from any other settlement, and World War I which was raging and making life difficult.

=== British Mandate ===
In 1921, members of Gdud HaAvoda, the Work Battalion, arrived in order to build a one-acre, fortified courtyard. They constructed a two-meter high stone wall with slits for shooting at attackers and a large, iron gate. A solitary, two-story stone building was also constructed which was intended to house the local people in times of trouble. The house was built in the style of 19th century houses in southern France and stands on the site to this day. Despite the large investment and effort expended on building the wall and the house, the members of Gdud HaAvodah left only a small contingent to stay on after completion of the construction. Of these, eventually only one person remained, who would later become the first member of Kibbutz Ein Shemer. His name was Shmuel Shuali and he was affectionately called Shmuel the First by his fellow kibbutz members and by what would be future generations of kibbutzniks.

In 1927, the first pioneers of HaShomer HaTzair arrived at the site. The group consisted of 18 women and 36 men, all in their late teens and early twenties. These youngsters left behind parents, homes, and future careers in order to fulfill their dream of revitalizing the Jewish people in its ancient homeland, to work the land with their own hands and to make the Zionist vision come true. They had immigrated from Poland and had at first lived and worked at Ein Ganim near Petah Tikva, awaiting the opportunity to settle and make their contribution in Eretz Israel. Shavuot 1927 is considered the date of the founding of the kibbutz. In the coming years, more groups of HaShomer HaTzair pioneers from Poland joined the first group. Each group had its own name – Binyamina, Shomriya, BaDerech – which it kept even as its members were integrated into the kibbutz.

The hardships were great. Decades later, it is hard to grasp the enormity of the self-sacrifice that they made in leaving their childhood homes, families, relatives, language and native land. Many of them came from affluent families and most never saw their families again. The lives of the kibbutz members were almost unbearable and 80 of the 100 first members fell ill with malaria. In 1934 the kibbutz was finally hooked up to the electric grid, and only in 1935 water was found on the site, leading to a revolution in the development of the farmstead and to the erection of a local water tower.

As members of HaShomer HaTzair, the founders sought ways to bring about cooperation and friendly relations with their Arab neighbors, and social contact was slowly made with the farmers of the area. Yet during the 1930s and 1940s there were security concerns and tension. In 1938 two members of the kibbutz were murdered in an attack by an Arab gang. Following World War II kibbutz members took part in the so-called "illegal" immigration of Holocaust survivors to the Land of Israel, which was prohibited under the British Mandate. When British soldiers raided neighboring Kibbutz Giv'at Haim in 1945, Ein Shemer members rushed to the defense of that kibbutz and of the right of Jews to immigrate to the Land of Israel. In the ensuing combat one member, Elimelech Shtarkman, was killed and several others were wounded.

In 1942 the British Royal Air Force built RAF Ein Shemer. During World War II it "was the largest military airfield in the country and home to seven Royal Air Force (RAF) squadrons and 1,500 RAF personnel." Between the autumn of 1943 and June 1945, it was home to 203 Group, RAF's 78 Operational Training Unit (OTU). It served as the workplace for as many as 600, mainly Arab, workers. This made it, in the opinion of its Commanding Officer, "the largest camp of its sort for civilian labour in the Middle East".

From the 1940s onward, scores of new members joined the kibbutz, some of them HaShomer HaTzair members from Egypt and the Balkans, which doubled the population of Ein Shemer. Others came through the Youth Aliya organization from Europe after the Holocaust and native Israelis joined in groups and individually.

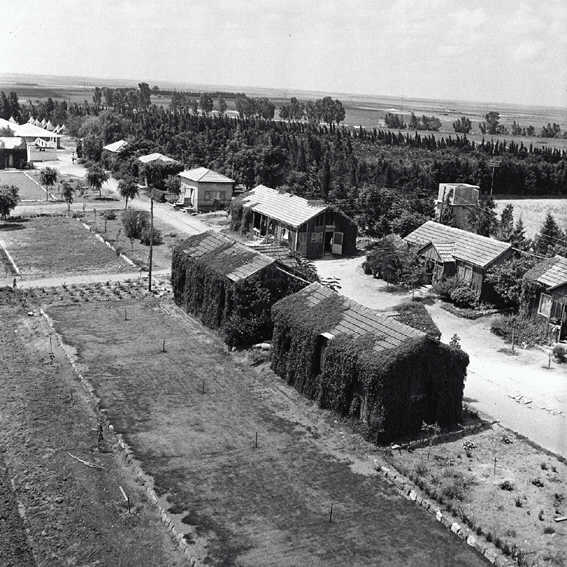
Ein Shemer 1943

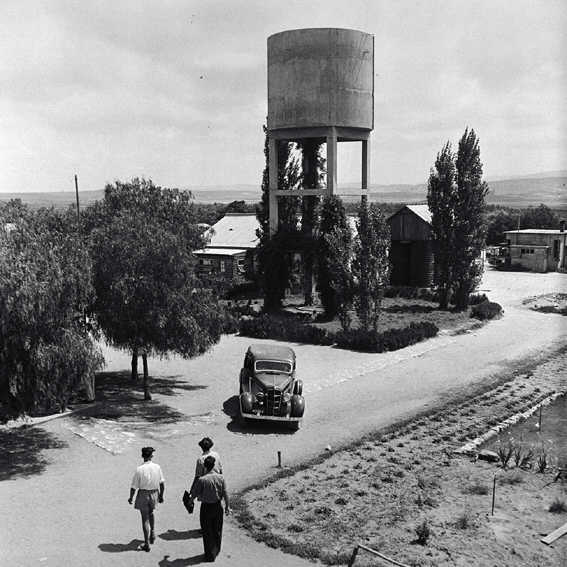
Ein Shemer 1943

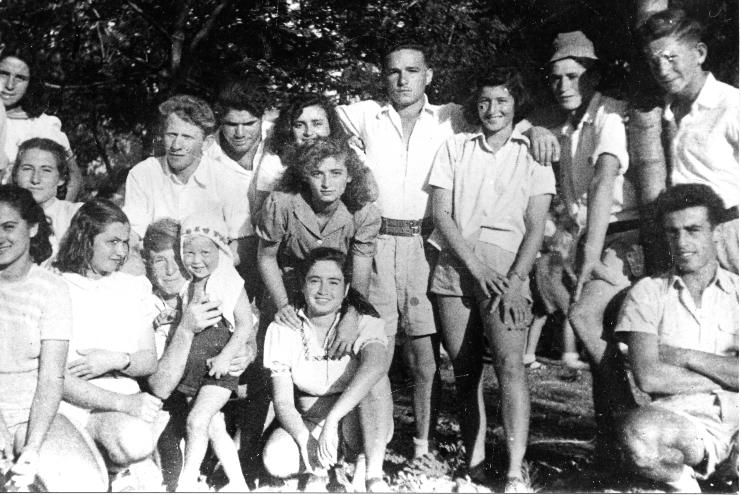
Members of Yiftach Brigade 1st Battalion, "D" company, training at Ein Shemer in 1947

=== State of Israel ===
Kibbutz Ein Shemer is one of the founders of HaKibbutz HaArtzi, the settlement movement of HaShomer HaTzair, and was one of the first four such kibbutzim (today there are 85 in the movement out of a total of about 265 kibbutzim). Among Ein Shemer's members have been prominent personalities in state and movement institutions, including: Zvi Lurie, one of the signers of the Israeli Declaration of Independence; Israel (Kurt) Hertz, one of the leaders of the Histadrut; Ya'kov (Kuba) Riftin, a six-time Knesset member from the Mapam party; and David (Dado) Elazar, a member of the Yugoslavian youth group on Ein Shemer who went on to become commander-in-chief of the Israel Defense Forces.

== Economy ==
The kibbutz economy in the early years was based primarily on agriculture: flocks of sheep, herds of cows, orchards, orange groves and field crops. Ein Shemer member Abba Stein developed the Anna and the Ein Shemer, two species of apples now grown in various places in the world, as well as other species of apples and plums. Another member, Moshe Grossman, was one of the founders of Granot, an agricultural co-operative that has since become a major economical force in the Israeli agricultural market. Beginning in the 1970s the agricultural branches of the kibbutz were reduced in size and now include cotton and other field crops, avocado groves and cowsheds. Industrial and commercial branches were established and gained prominence in the kibbutz economy. A rubber factory, Ein Shemer Rubber Industries and a plastics factory, Miniplast Ein Shemer, were set up on the kibbutz in 1968 and 1976 respectively, and a small shopping center for the general public was established at the Karkur intersection nearby. Other sources of kibbutz income are from members who work outside the kibbutz, as well as personal initiatives such as the artistic blacksmith's forge, ecological greenhouse, film production company, event planning company, architect's office, center for holistic treatments and others.

In the mid 1980s Ein Shemer, together with much of the kibbutz movement, underwent a severe economic downturn as a result of the monetary policy of the new right-wing Israeli government. At the end of the 1990s the kibbutz emerged from the crisis after signing an agreement among the kibbutz, the banks and the Israel Land Administration.

At about the same time as the economic crisis, the kibbutz underwent a social transformation, as the center of social life went from the collective to the family unit. In the 1980s the children, who had slept in children's houses since the kibbutz was founded, began sleeping in their parents' homes. During the 1990s many items of consumption were privatized and the members' personal budgets were enlarged as the communal budget decreased in scope. From 2000 until 2011, an ongoing discussion raged concerning possible future distribution of differential salaries to the members – an issue that was decided upon on Sept. 11, 2011 and was put into effect on Jan. 1, 2012. Since that date Ein Shemer is privatized and belongs to a growing group of kibbutzim known as "renewing kibbutzim".

== Education and culture ==
Since its founding, education has been a main priority. The kibbutz children lived in a children's house with their peers, under the guidance of dedicated educators who nurtured in them a love of nature, humanity, a sense of justice and cooperation. Over the years kibbutz education changed, yet to this day kibbutz education is considered among the finest in the country. Ein Shemer's kindergartens have a special kibbutz character, based on treating each child individually and holistically, and at the same time creating a deep connection between the children, their natural surrounding and the community. Another unique educational enterprise is the regional high school, Mevo'ot 'Iron, which was founded in 1949 by members of Kibbutz Ein Shemer and which other kibbutzim, Ma'anit, Barkai, and Metzer later joined. Today the school is a drawing point for young people throughout the area, and has about 1,000 pupils, including young immigrants from Ethiopia and the former Soviet Union.

For many years Ein Shemer had one of the leading volleyball teams in Israel, and during the 1950s and 1960s the men's and women's teams were at the top of the national league. One of the high points for local sports fans was the game held in 1960 between HaPoel Ein Shemer and Galatasarai, a Turkish team, for which a playing court and bleachers were built on the kibbutz and still stand. Today Ein Shemer is a partner in a regional volleyball team, HaMa'apil-Ein-Shemer-Menashe.

The kibbutz has been known for its artists and intellectuals. In the first generation some of the prominent figures were: writers Moshe Zertal, Zvi Lurie, Rivka Gurfein, poets Azriel Ukhmani and Arieh Shamri, poet and translator Zvi Arad, caricaturist and artist Yitzhak (Ignatz) Palgi, architect Ya'akov (Kuba) Gever and many others. Among the second generation, the children of the Ein-Shemer founders, and the children's spouses, are: poet and author Eli Alon, artists Avital Geva, Zibi Geva and Tzilla Lis, archaeologist and author Adam Zertal, thinker and writer Avishai Grossman, educator and writer Rafael (Rafi) Shapira, musician Miri Grossberg, blacksmith artisan Uri Hofi, cinematographer Yigal Tibon, journalist, writer and historian Nardo Zalko and many others. Notable talents of the third generation and their spouses include: author Rakefet Zohar, cinematographer Oren Tirosh, musician Zamir Golan and artist Atar Geva.

== Landmarks ==
The Old Courtyard is a reconstruction museum depicting early kibbutz settlement in Israel. It stands on the original one-acre site where the first pioneers established the kibbutz and features indoor and outdoor exhibits of the early years of kibbutz life, as well as activities such as bread baking. Other attractions are an operable oil press, the oak train (a reconstruction of the Ottoman Turkish train that ran through the region at the beginning of the last century) and an exhibit of tractors and agricultural machinery from the early 20th century.

The Ecological Greenhouse is an educational center dealing with ecology and social commitment. Jewish and Arab youths participate in seminars and workshops devoted to peaceful co-existence, ecology, environment and scientific research.

Hofi's Forge consists of a smithy, an exhibition hall and a school for blacksmiths founded by Uri Hofi, a blacksmith-artisan.

On the grounds of the kibbutz is a relief sculpture of the sculptor Nathan Rapoport commemorating the operations that brought so-called "illegal" Jewish immigrants to the Land of Israel and the participation of Ein Shemer members in those operations. Another notable monument commemorates two paratroopers, members of the Kibbutz who were killed in the Six-Day War in 1967.

== Notable residents ==
- Adam Zertal, archaeologist
- David (Dado) Elazar, IDF chief-of-staff
