= Melford Stevenson =

English High Court judge (1902–1987)

The Right Honourable Sir Melford Stevenson
- Mr Justice Stevenson in 1959

Justice of the High Court
- In office 1 October 1957 – 23 April 1979

Personal details
- Born: Aubrey Melford Steed Stevenson; 17 October 1902 Newquay, Cornwall, England
- Died: 26 December 1987 (aged 85) St Leonards-on-Sea, East Sussex, England
- Spouses: Anna Cecilia Francesca Imelda Reinstein (m. 1929; div. 1942) Rosalind Monica Wagner (m. 1947)
- Children: 3
- Education: Dulwich College; University of London

Sir Aubrey Melford Steed Stevenson, PC (17 October 1902 – 26 December 1987), usually known as Sir Melford Stevenson, was an English barrister and, later, a High Court judge, whose judicial career was marked by his controversial conduct and outspoken views.

After establishing a legal career in the field of insolvency, Stevenson served during the Second World War as a Deputy Judge Advocate General of the Armed Forces. He was subsequently Judge Advocate at the 1945 war crimes trial of former personnel of the German submarine U-852 for their actions in what became known as the Peleus affair. In 1954 Stevenson represented the government of British Kenya during Jomo Kenyatta's unsuccessful appeal against his conviction for membership of the rebel organisation Mau Mau. Later that year he represented the litigants in the Crichel Down affair, which led to changes in the law on compulsory purchase. In 1955 he defended Ruth Ellis, the last woman to be executed for murder in the United Kingdom. He was deeply distressed by the execution of Ellis, for whom there had been no defence in law, but whom Home Secretary Gwilym Lloyd George was expected to reprieve. Two years later, Stevenson took part in the unsuccessful prosecution of John Bodkin Adams for the murder of Edith Alice Morrell.

Stevenson became a High Court judge in 1957, and acquired a reputation for severity in sentencing. He sentenced the Kray twins to life imprisonment in 1969, with a recommendation that they serve not less than 30 years each. In 1970 Stevenson passed long sentences on eight Cambridge University students who took part in the Garden House riot, and the following year gave Jake Prescott of the Angry Brigade 15 years for conspiracy to cause explosions.

One of his fellow judges, Sir Robin Dunn, described him as "the worst judge since the war". After Dunn's attack, several high-profile legal figures came to Stevenson's defence, among them fellow judge and biographer Lord Roskill, who pointed out that Stevenson could be merciful to those he regarded as victims. Lord Devlin described Stevenson as the "last of the grand eccentrics". Mr Justice Stevenson retired from the bench in 1979 aged 76, and died at St Leonards in East Sussex on 26 December 1987.

== Early life ==
Stevenson was born in Newquay, Cornwall, on 17 October 1902, the eldest child and only son of the Reverend John George Stevenson and his wife Olive, sister of Henry Wickham Steed, journalist and editor of The Times from 1919 until 1922. The Rev. J. G. Stevenson, a Congregational minister, died when his son was fourteen years old, plunging the family into relative poverty. An uncle who was a solicitor funded Stevenson's ongoing education at Dulwich College in London, intending that the young Stevenson would join the family firm once his schooling was complete. There was no money available to allow him to attend university, so Stevenson studied for an external London University LLB degree after becoming an articled clerk in his uncle's legal practice. Stevenson was determined to become a barrister, and joined the Inner Temple, of which he became the treasurer in 1972.

== Career at the bar ==
Shortly after being called to the bar in 1925 he joined the chambers of Wintringham Stable at 2 Crown Office Row, now Fountain Court Chambers. He remained there for the rest of his legal career, save for the war years, eventually becoming head of chambers.

Most of Stevenson's early legal work was in the field of insolvencies, "almost always with small fees", and he made steady progress until the outbreak of the Second World War in 1939. He did very little criminal work in this part of his career. In 1940 he joined the army and served until 1945 as a Deputy Judge Advocate with the rank of major; he was appointed a King's Counsel in 1943. In 1945 he served as Judge Advocate at the war crimes trial in Hamburg of former personnel of the German submarine U-852, the so-called Peleus affair. The U-boat captain, Heinz-Wilhelm Eck, was accused of ordering his crew to open fire on the survivors of a Greek ship, the SS Peleus, which they had just torpedoed and sunk. Eck and two of his junior officers were executed by firing squad; he was the only U-boat commander of the war to be convicted of war crimes committed at sea.

In the late 1940s and early 1950s Stevenson started to build his chambers' high reputation for commercial litigation, together with Alan Orr and Leslie Scarman, supported by a notable barristers' clerk, Cyril Batchelor. He was elected a bencher of the Inner Temple in 1950, and appointed Recorder of Cambridge, a part-time judge, in 1952; he had previously served as Recorder for Rye from 1944 to 1951. In 1954 he represented the government of British Kenya during Jomo Kenyatta's unsuccessful appeal against his conviction for membership of the rebel Mau Mau; Kenyatta was a moderate, and is now considered unlikely to have been a member of the organisation. He was imprisoned until 1959, lived under house arrest until 1961, and became the first president of the newly independent Kenya in 1964. Also in 1954 Stevenson represented the Marten family in the Crichel Down affair. The Air Ministry had compulsorily purchased land for bombing practice before the war, promising to return it after the end of hostilities. When they did not honour this promise, the Martens successfully campaigned to be allowed to buy the land back. The case led to a public enquiry, changes in the law on compulsory purchase, and the first resignation of a government minister since 1917.

According to fellow judge Eustace Roskill, Stevenson's "fluent delivery, distinctive voice, remarkable sense of timing, and pungency of phrase soon marked him out as an advocate of note." One commentator described him as a "shameless performer" in court. He was probably the most successful barrister of his day.

In 1955, aided by junior counsel Sebag Shaw and Peter Rawlinson, Stevenson defended Ruth Ellis against the charge of murdering her lover. Stevenson's decision to keep his cross-examination of the prosecution witnesses to a minimum, and his "near silent performance in court", have been severely criticised by Muriel Jakubait, Ellis's sister. He opened the defence by saying: "Let me make this abundantly plain: there is no question here but this woman shot this man ... You will not hear one word from me – or from the lady herself – questioning that." The jury took 23 minutes to find Ellis guilty; she was sentenced to be hanged, the last woman executed for murder in the United Kingdom. Public revulsion at the case is thought to have played a part in the abolition of capital punishment in the UK in 1969. (Note: The 1965 Murder (Abolition of Death Penalty) Act abolished the death penalty for murder. The last hangings were in 1964.)

Stevenson was a leading member of the legal team assisting Sir Reginald Manningham-Buller during the failed prosecution of Dr John Bodkin Adams in 1957. The prosecution's conduct of the trial has been heavily criticised, and its decision to drop a second murder charge via a nolle prosequi was scathingly described by the trial judge, Patrick Devlin, as "an abuse of process", saying: "The use of nolle prosequi to conceal the deficiencies of the prosection was an abuse of process, which left an innocent man under the suspicion that there might have been something in the talk of mass murder after all". Stevenson was of the opinion that had he been allowed to, he "could have successfully prosecuted Adams on six murder counts". Journalist Rodney Hallworth reports that Stevenson said of Adams' decision not to give evidence in court "I firmly believe justice is not served by the present law. It should be possible for the prosecution to directly examine an accused ... It was a clear example of the privilege of silence having enabled a guilty man to escape." In Stevenson's opinion Adams "was so incredibly lucky to have literally got away with murder".

== Judicial career ==
... without knowing what bodies, political or other, Melford belonged to, it would be safe to say that he was on the right wing of all of them.

— Lord Devlin

Bathurst [Viscount Bledisloe] used to recount the story of Stevenson trying a manslaughter case in which a man who had run over a child pleaded, in extenuation, that he had thought the child was a dog; the judge, a great spaniel lover, promptly gave him the maximum sentence.

I must confess I cannot tell whether you are innocent or guilty. I am giving you three years. If you are guilty you have got off lightly, if innocent let this be a lesson to you.

— Sir Melford Stevenson

Stevenson was appointed a High Court judge on 1 October 1957, and (as is traditional) was knighted a few days later. From 1958 until 1960, he was a member of an Inter-Departmental Committee on Human Artificial Insemination. For the first four years of his judicial career Stevenson was assigned to the Probate, Divorce and Admiralty Division, after which he was transferred to the Queen's Bench Division, where he presided over criminal cases. He then began to attract press attention. Known for his outspokenness, Stevenson described one case as a "pretty anaemic kind of rape", because the victim was the accused's ex-girlfriend and had been hitch-hiking, before sentencing the man to a two-year suspended sentence. To a man acquitted of rape, he remarked "I see you come from Slough. It is a terrible place. You can go back there." In similar vein he told a husband involved in a divorce case that his decision to live in Manchester was "a wholly incomprehensible choice for any free man to make".

Following a 1964 parallel of his comments in the wake of the Bodkin Adams case, Stevenson attracted criticism for his summing up to the jury in the case of Ryan:

It is, we think, clear ... that it is wrong to say to a jury "Because the accused exercised what is undoubtedly his right, the privilege of remaining silent, you may draw an inference of guilt"; it is quite a different matter to say "this accused, as he is entitled to do, has not advanced at an earlier stage the explanation that has been offered to you today; you the jury may take that into account when you are assessing the weight that you think it right to attribute to the explanation."

The academic lawyer Rupert Cross described Stevenson's pronouncement as "gibberish", and to the Court of Appeal in 1977 it seemed that Stevenson had made a distinction "without a difference". Although Stevenson's direction was not in accordance with the law in 1964, Parliament introduced a form of caution under the Police and Criminal Evidence Act 1984 that reflects what he proposed. His earlier suggestion that defendants in criminal trials should be forced to answer prosecution questions has not been adopted.

Stevenson believed that it was the judge's duty to help prevent crime by imposing robust punishments on those found guilty, and he became noted for the severity of his sentencing, which led to occasional calls from the "liberal establishment" for his resignation. In 1969 he sentenced the Kray twins, Reggie and Ronnie, to a minimum of 30 years in jail each, saying, "In my view, society has earned a rest from your activities." He remarked later that the Krays had only told the truth twice during the trial: when Reggie referred to a barrister as "a fat slob" and when Ronnie accused the judge of being biased.

In 1970 he controversially gave what were seen as excessively long sentences to eight Cambridge University students who took part in the Garden House riot, a demonstration against the Greek military government that turned violent. (Note: All eight of the students found guilty of at least one offence received custodial sentences ranging from nine to eighteen months; those under 21 were sent to borstal rather than prison.) He noted that the sentences would have been even longer but for the students' exposure to "the evil influence of some members of the university". There were few, if any, examples of serious violence at student demonstrations in the years which followed the trial. (Note: All but one of the sentences were upheld on appeal.) The following year he gave a 15-year sentence to Jake Prescott, a member of the Angry Brigade, for conspiracy to cause explosions. Prescott had been found not guilty of direct involvement in the bombings, but had admitted to addressing three envelopes. His sentence was reduced to ten years on appeal.

Stevenson turned down a chance to join the Court of Appeal, a decision he later regretted, and was subsequently critical of some of its decisions. He was appointed a privy counsellor in the 1973 New Year Honours. His reference to the Sexual Offences Act 1967 as a "buggers' charter" earned him a reprimand from the Lord Chancellor, Lord Elwyn-Jones, and a parliamentary motion in the UK House of Commons calling for his resignation. (Note: Stevenson made his comment while sentencing a 61-year-old man to five years in prison for homosexual acts involving teenagers: "Cases such as these are all the more grave in these days because some years ago Parliament committed itself to pass a buggers' charter ...".) In 1976 the Court of Appeal overturned three of Stevenson's decisions in a single day, and Labour member of parliament Marcus Lipton tabled another parliamentary motion calling for his removal from the bench.

But Eustace Roskill cautions that "It would be wrong to judge Stevenson simply by the notoriety of a few cases .... he showed great mercy to those whom he saw to be victims rather than aggressors." In the early 1970s, while conducting training sessions in sentencing for newly appointed recorders, Stevenson summed up his attitude: "You sentence off the top of your head. If the man's a shit, down he goes. If there's something to be said for him, you do your best not to put him inside." Despite his stern and authoritarian reputation, in the 1970s he sometimes submitted letters to the Court of Appeal supporting the reduction of his sentences.

When asked towards the end of his career whether he had been stung by the criticism he had received, Stevenson replied "A lot of my colleagues are just constipated Methodists". There was no compulsory retirement age for a judge with Stevenson's length of service, which resulted in some speculation following the announcement of his retirement from the bench in 1979 that perhaps his unpopularity with certain sections of the media and establishment had led to pressure on him to step down.

In an article published on the day of Stevenson's retirement, Corinna Adam of The Guardian observed that:

He [Stevenson] holds the record among Old Bailey judges for having his sentences queried and taken to appeal. He also holds the record for getting away with it. He has gradually become such a stock hate-figure that lawyers tend automatically to advise their clients, if found guilty, to take their cases higher up.

== Personal life ==
Stevenson married Anna Cecilia Francesca Imelda Reinstein, daughter of a Bavarian hairdresser, in 1929. They had one daughter. He "turned her [his wife] out" after he discovered that she had been having an affair with Colonel Maurice Buckmaster, head of the French section of the Special Operations Executive (SOE). They were divorced in 1942, and she married Buckmaster. Stevenson married his second wife, Rosalind Monica Wagner, the sister of Sir Anthony Wagner, in 1947, and together they had a son – who also became a barrister – and a daughter.

After the war, Stevenson stood as the Conservative Party candidate to represent Maldon in the 1945 United Kingdom general election. He opened his campaign by declaring that in the interests of a clean fight, he would make no allusions to the "alleged homosexuality" of his opponent, Tom Driberg, who heavily defeated him in the vote; Stevenson returned to his legal practice the following year.

Despite his severe manner, Stevenson was extremely sociable and he was often the centre of a lively crowd at the bar of the Garrick Club, of which he was a member. His home at Winchelsea on the Sussex coast was called Truncheons, sometimes taken to reflect his authoritarian views, but the area had been known by that name for many years before his arrival. Following his retirement, Stevenson called for the restoration of the death penalty for all murders, and made frequent guest appearances on television until his health and eyesight began to fail. Among the programmes he took part in was Granada Television's six-part series The Bounds of Freedom, broadcast in 1979.

Stevenson died in St Leonards on 26 December 1987. A memorial tablet to him and his wife was erected in the Church of St Mary the Virgin, Rye, in 1992.
