= Ecce Homo (statue) =

Sculpture at Loyola University Chicago

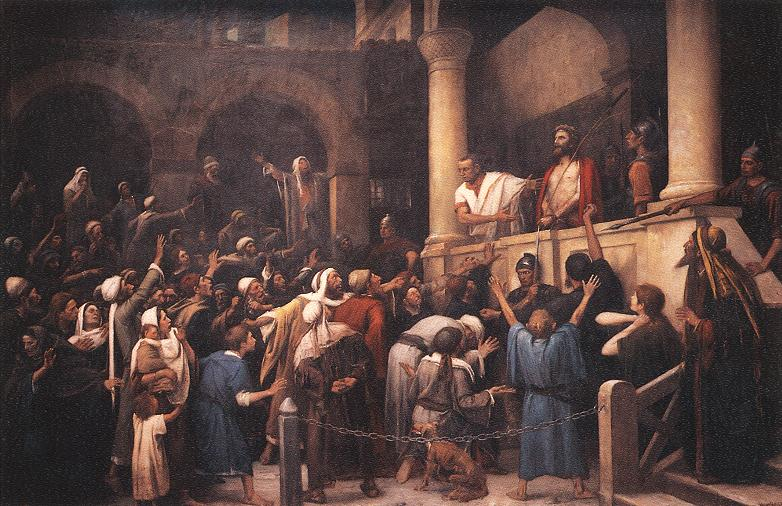
Munkácsy-Ecce homo

Ecce Homo is a statue of Jesus during his trial after being imprisoned by the Romans. The statue's title, Ecce Homo, is an allusion to the famous proclamation by Pontius Pilate, "behold the Man." The statue, made entirely of carved wood, depicts Jesus in a horrific state of suffering and anguish. Although its creator remains anonymous, Ecce Homo is believed to have been carved in Spain sometime around the year 1600 AD.

Like many forms of Baroque era art, the focus of this piece comes in the form of an emotional connection with Christ. In the Summer 2010 issue of the Loyola University Magazine, Jonathan Canning explains the artistic technique used by the creator to convey this emotion, "His [Christ’s] skin has been painted to reveal bruising and welts beneath the skin, while small, red glass beads have been set into the sculpture’s open wounds to suggest flowing blood." Additionally, Christ's face has been carved so that he is looking down, with an expression that depict complete misery. It is believed that the artist's aim was to trigger a sympathetic response with the viewer. The pathos attributed to this piece may have been intended to serve as a form of worship in which Christians create an emotional connection with Christ.

== Biblical context ==
Ecce Homo is an allusion to Christ's trial under Pontius Pilate. The phrase "Ecce Homo" translate to "behold the Man," which is used to ridicule Jesus' claim of divinity. In a similar sense, the red cape and crown of thorns satirizes Jesus' royal claim to Israel.

== Move to Chicago ==
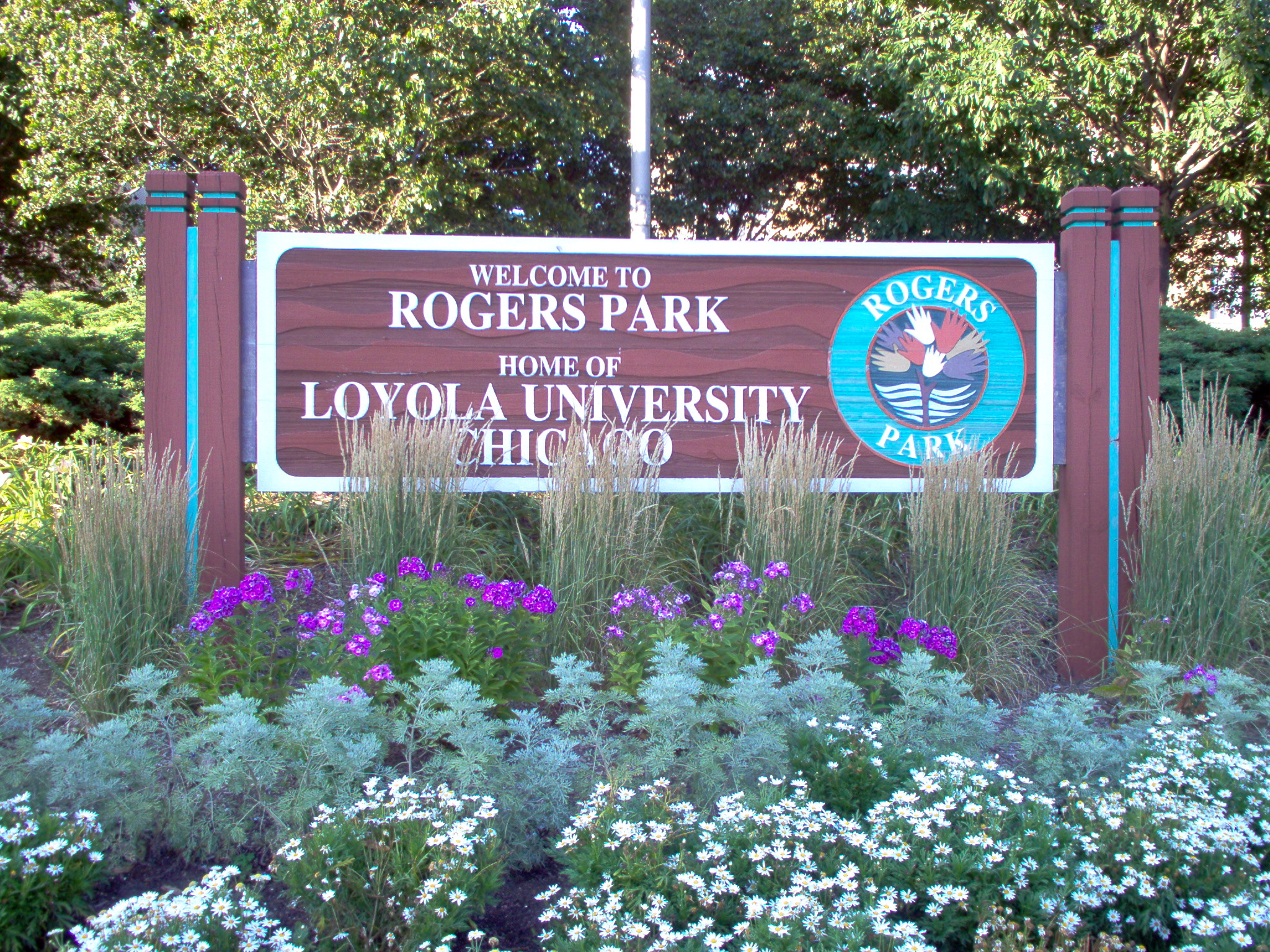
Ecce Homo can be found at Loyola University in Chicago, Illinois

Ecce Homo was donated to the Loyola University Museum of Art by a private collector named Janet Relos (1916-1981). Currently, the statue is part of the museum's Martin D'Arcy, S.J. Collection of Baroque Art. Although Loyola University is a Jesuit institution, the D'Arcy collection contains secular pieces in addition to its Christian collections.

=== Loyola University Museum of Art ===
Since its opening in 2005, The Loyola University Museum of Art's (LUMA) mission has been to "explore and promote the spiritual in art of all faiths and cultures." LUMA has two permanent collections: The Martin D’Arcy, S.J. Collection of Baroque Art and The Luma Collection for art beyond D'Arcy pieces. LUMA provides education resources to both students and the public that aim to promote the discovery and awareness of art in different faiths. The Museum does not accept unsolicited donations and does not typically make appointments to review pieces.

== History ==
=== Possible connection to the Council of Trent ===
If one accepts Loyola University's estimate for this piece's time of creation, then Ecce Homo is contemporary with the Council of Trent. In response to the Protestant Reformation the Catholic Church made many amendments to Church policy. In addition to trying to stamp out Protestantism through claims of heresy, the council also implemented new mandates in regards to artistic depictions of Christ; when shown in his final days, Christ was only allowed to be depicted as suffering. By assuming that Ecce Homo was created within the artistic jurisdiction of the Council of Trent, one can infer that the creator was a devout Christian, and that this piece was created with religious, and not secular, intent.
