= Andrei Rabodzeenko =

Russian-American artist

Andrei Rabodzeenko (born 1961) is a Russian-American artist.

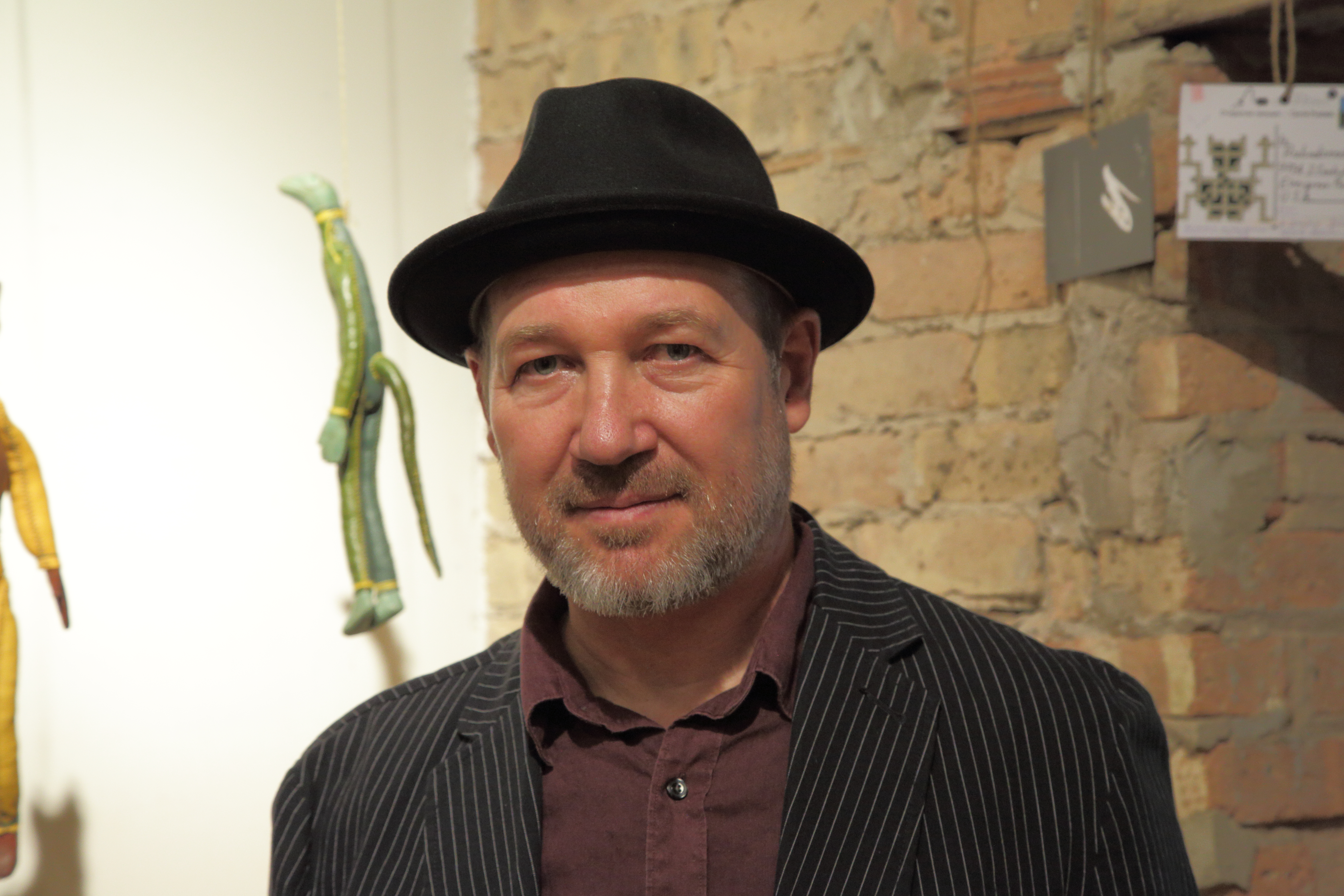
Andrei Rabodzeenko

== Personal ==
Born in Kyrgyzstan, USSR, he completed his studies at the Mukhina School of Art and Design in Leningrad, USSR (now St. Petersburg Art and Industry Academy). Since 1991, he lives and works in Chicago, Illinois, USA. He is a member of Chicago Sculpture International.

== Artwork ==
Andrei Rabodzeenko's art focuses on philosophical themes, and has been characterized as capturing the spirit of the times. In his work, he asks "questions that humans have been asking for millennia—questions about ignorance and suffering, faith and pride, ambition and greed. And above all, about divine power. Lots of people steer clear of these deep waters. Yet the ways each generation explores them feed the zeitgeist, or spirit of the times."

Rabodzeenko explores such philosophical themes in different media and styles: painting, drawing, and sculpture. In oils, he paints in two distinct styles, Archetypes and Metaphysics. Archetypes are a realistic-surrealistic style using techniques and images reminiscent of art from the early Italian Renaissance. This work has been described by one critic as expressing humanistic values in allegorical form. Another reviewer points to the fact that although the work initially looks like it is straight from the Renaissance, after closer inspection, the work reveals subtle references to modernity. Metaphysics is a more primitive, symbolic style that mines personal yet universal dream imagery. "Imagine the glowing, contemporary paintings of Mark Rothko, throw in the symbolism of Salvador Dali, and mix it up with some Picasso etchings, and you start to grasp the world of ... artist Andrei Rabodzeenko."

He also creates semi-abstract sculptures out of wood and metal, installations, and graphic work, using ink, charcoal, and chalk on paper.

His paintings, drawings, and sculptures are in private and public collections, including the Loyola University Museum of Art (Chicago), Skokie Northshore Sculpture Park (Skokie, IL), and Emmanuel College, Cambridge University (UK).
