= Wintringham Stable =

British High Court judge

The Right Honourable Sir Wintringham Stable MC

Judge of the High Court
- In office 1938–1968

Personal details
- Education: Christ Church, Oxford

Sir Wintringham Norton Stable, MC (19 March 1888 – 23 November 1977) was a British High Court judge from 1938 to 1968.

Stable, known as "Owlie", was admitted to the Middle Temple on 13 November 1908, was called to the bar on 27 January 1913, and was appointed to the Bench of the High Court on 26 November 1938.

He was head of chambers at 2, Crown Office Row, which towards the end of his life moved premises and became known as Fountain Court Chambers. He admitted colleagues who gained his set a strong reputation for commercial litigation, especially Melford Stevenson QC, who succeeded him as head of chambers, Leslie Scarman QC, and Alan Orr QC.

== Early life ==
The third and only surviving son of Daniel Wintringham Stable, a barrister and director of the Prudential, and his wife Gertrude, Stable was educated at Winchester College and Christ Church, Oxford.

His legal career was delayed by the First World War. He served throughout the conflict, first with the Montgomeryshire Yeomanry and then with the Royal Welch Fusiliers and was awarded the MC. His elder brother was killed in 1914.

He married Lucie Murphy (née Freeman, d. 1976) in 1916. She was a widow with a young daughter. They had two sons, Philip and Owen, both of whom became QCs.

== Legal career ==
Commencing practice in 1919, Stable specialised in bankruptcy work and in 1935 took silk. Appointed a High Court judge in 1938, he served until 1968 and was made a Privy Counsellor in 1965.

In 1954 he presided over the "Philanderer Trial" (R. v. Martin Secker & Warburg Ltd.) and his summing up led to an applauded acquittal and the discouragement of prosecutions for all but clear cases of obscenity.

His sentences in serious cases were not lenient, but they did not provoke public criticism. He had a reputation for showing 'tender mercy' to those he felt were the victims of circumstance. He twice used the words "my dear" to a girl placed on probation in 1961 after she had been found guilty of harbouring a man convicted of a capital murder.
