= Granot =

Granot is a surname. Notable people with the surname include:

- Archie Granot, paper cut artist based in Israel
- Avraham Granot (1890–1962), Zionist activist, Israeli politician and a signatory of the Israeli declaration of independence
- Elazar Granot (1927–2013), Israeli politician and writer
- Frieda Granot, Israeli-Canadian operations researcher

== See also ==
- Granot Central Cooperative, purchasing organization of the kibbutz movement in Israel
- Neve Granot, neighborhood in Jerusalem, Israel, located behind the Israel Museum, overlooking the Monastery of the Cross
