= SS Peleus =

Greek-owned cargo ship sunk in WW2, & survivors massacred

- Peleus at anchor

History
- Name: 1928: Egglestone; 1928: Peleus
- Namesake: 1928: Egglestone Abbey; 1928: Peleus
- Owner: 1928: William Gray & Co; 1928: EE Hadjilias; 1933: Nereus SN Co Ltd
- Operator: 1928: EE Hadjilias
- Port of registry: 1928: (United Kingdom) West Hartlepool; 1928: (Greece) Syros
- Builder: William Gray & Co, West Hartlepool
- Yard number: 999
- Launched: 6 February 1928
- Completed: March 1928
- Identification: 1928: UK official number 139253; 1928: code letters LBKN; until 1933: code letters JGWT; by 1934: call sign SZGL
- Fate: sunk by torpedo, 13 March 1944

General characteristics
- Type: cargo steamship
- Tonnage: 4,695 GRT, 2,840 NRT
- Length: 400.1 ft (122.0 m) registered
- Beam: 54.2 ft (16.5 m)
- Draught: 24 ft 6 in (7.47 m)
- Depth: 25.1 ft (7.7 m)
- Decks: 2
- Installed power: 1 × triple-expansion engine, 476 NHP
- Propulsion: 1 × screw
- Speed: 10 knots (19 km/h)
- Crew: by 1944: 35 + 4 DEMS gunners
- Sensors & processing systems: by 1940: wireless direction finding
- Armament: by 1944: defensively equipped merchant ship

SS Peleus was a cargo steamship. She was built in 1928 in England as Egglestone. Later that year, a Greek shipowner bought her and renamed her Peleus. She served on the Allied side during the Second World War. In 1944, a U-boat sank her, and then attacked her survivors with grenades and machine gun fire, killing all but four of them. This is the only proven case of a U-boat in the Second World War committing a war crime of this type.

== Building ==
William Gray & Company of West Hartlepool, County Durham, built the ship as yard number 999. She was launched on 6 February 1928, and completed that March. Her registered length was 400.1 ft (122.0 m), her beam was 54.2 ft (16.5 m), her depth was 25.1 ft (7.7 m), and her draught was 24 ft 6 in (7.47 m). She had a single screw, driven by a three-cylinder triple-expansion engine, built by the Central Marine Engineering Works of West Hartlepool. It was rated at 476 NHP, and gave her a speed of 10 knots (19 km/h).

== Ownership and registration ==
The ship was completed as Egglestone, named after the site of Egglestone Abbey in County Durham. At first, Wm Gray & Co owned her, and registered her in West Hartlepool. Her UK official number was 139253, and her code letters were LBKN.

Later in 1928, EE Hadjilias, from the Greek Island of Kasos, bought the ship and renamed her Peleus, after the mythical ancient Greek hero Peleus. He registered her in Syros, and her code letters were JGWT. In 1933, Hadjilias transferred her ownership to the Nereus Steam Navigation Company, but he remained her manager. By 1934, her call sign was SZGL, and this had superseded her code letters. By June 1940, she was equipped with wireless direction finding.

== North Atlantic convoys ==
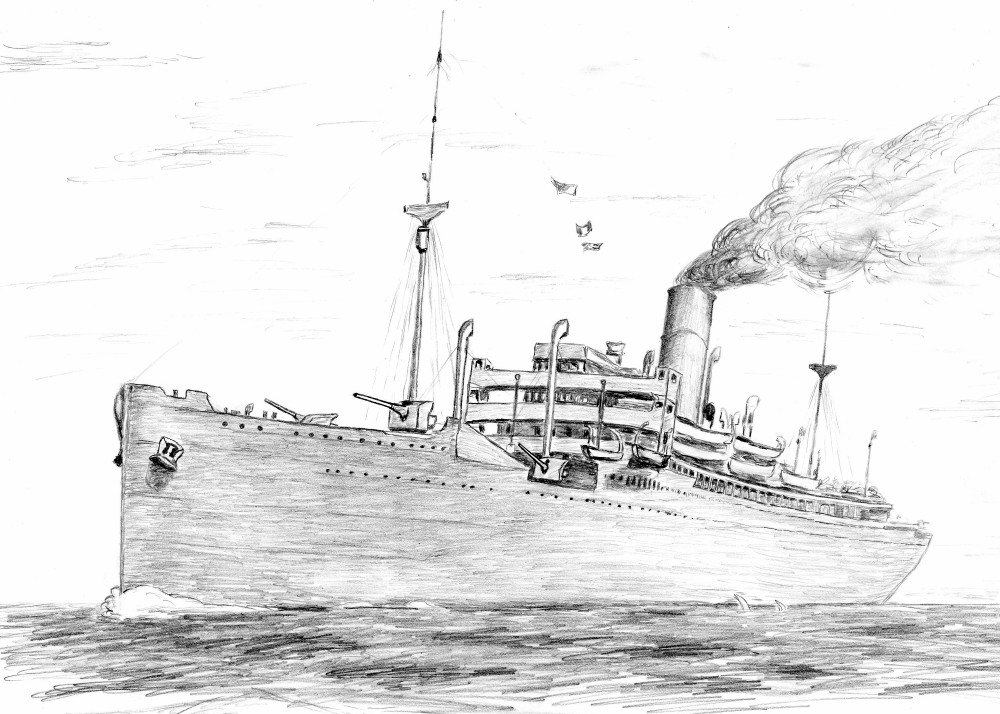
A drawing of the AMC HMS Jervis Bay, which for several days was the sole escort of Convoy HX 51

On 28 March 1940, Peleus left Port Said in Egypt. She sailed via Gibraltar, where she joined Convoy HG 26 to the UK. HG 26 went to Liverpool, but Peleus detached for the Downs, where she arrived on 23 April. On 2 May she sailed to Swansea in Convoy OA 140G, which had only one escort, the destroyer HMS Whitehall, to protect 31 merchant ships.

From May 1940 until June 1941, Peleus took part in North Atlantic traffic between the UK and North America. Her cargoes included coal from South Wales to Canada, grain from Canada to the UK, and scrap iron from Boston to the UK.

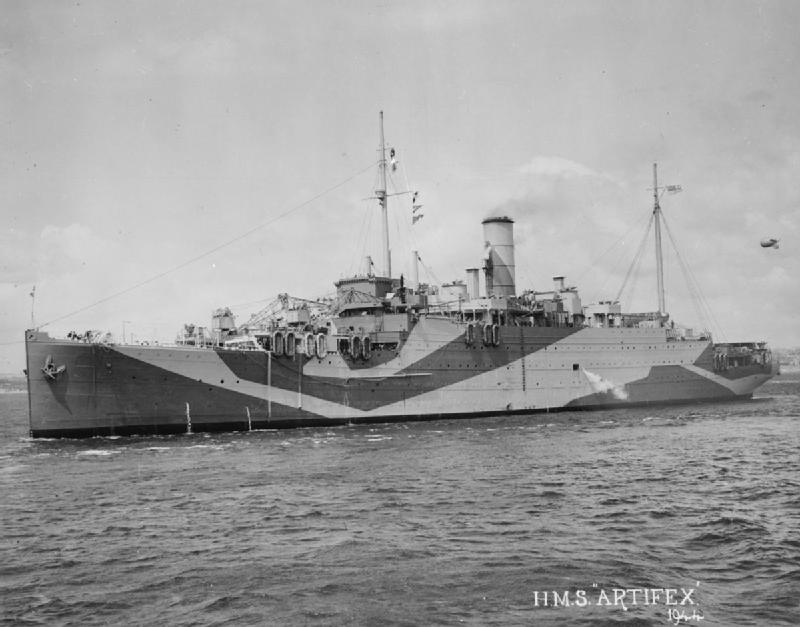
The AMC HMS Artifex, which for several days was the sole escort of Convoy HX 75

Westbound, Peleus sailed in the convoys OB 151, OB 190, OB 282, and Convoy OG 61, but these took her only part of the way across the ocean. OB 151, OB 190, and OB 282 all dispersed at sea, a few days after leaving port, and thereafter Peleus sailed unescorted to North America. OG 61 was a convoy to Gibraltar, so after a few days Peleus detached to continue unescorted to Montreal.

For eastbound voyages, Peleus loaded cargo in Canadian or US ports, and then waited for an eastbound convoy to Britain. Usually she waited in the natural harbour or Halifax, Nova Scotia, but on one occasion she waited at the anchorage of Sydney, Cape Breton Island. Unlike westbound convoys, eastbound convoys sailed all the way across the North Atlantic without dispersing. Peleus sailed in convoys HX 51, HX 75, HX 115, and HX 131.

In Britain, Peleus loaded and unloaded at ports either in the Bristol Channel, or on the east coast of England. From Swansea, Barry, or Avonmouth, she sailed to the anchorage of Milford Haven to wait to join an outbound convoy. On return, she would put in to Belfast Lough before continuing to the Bristol Channel ports.

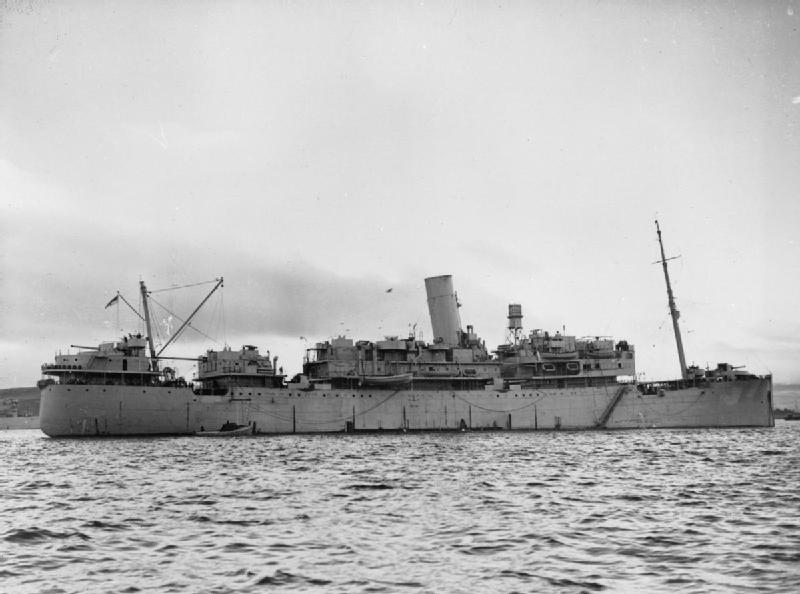
The AMC HMS Cheshire was part of the escort of Convoy HX 131

Getting to or from ports on the River Tyne or the Thames Estuary was more complex. One set of coastal convoys linked the Thames Estuary off Southend with the Firth of Forth off Methil. Another linked the Firth of Forth with Loch Ewe, which is an anchorage on the west coast of Scotland. Most transatlantic convoys started from, or ended at, Liverpool, but Loch Ewe was a convenient point from which to join westbound convoys, or detach from eastbound convoys. Peleus used Loch Ewe, and convoys to and from the Firth of Forth and the Thames Estuary, to get to and from ports on the Tyne and the Thames.

Greece was neutral until 28 October 1940, when Italy attacked Greece. Peleus would have been unarmed until then. In November 1940, Peleus sailed from Swansea to Milford Haven, and then back to Swansea. This may have been for Peleus to be armed at Pembroke Dockyard as a defensively equipped merchant ship (DEMS). For a ship of her size, DEMS armament was typically one 4.7-inch (120 mm) or 4-inch (100 mm) naval gun on the poop, for defence against submarines and surface craft; and one or two machine guns on the superstructure amidships, for air defence. Once armed, Peleus carried four Royal Navy gunners to crew her main gun. Members of her own crew would have been trained to load and fire her machine guns.

== Farther afield ==
From July 1941 until her sinking in March 1944, Peleus' voyages were more varied, and in some cases far longer. On 21 July 1941, she left the Tyne on what became a 13-month voyage. That August and September, she called at Buenos Aires and Rosario in Argentina, and Rio de Janeiro in Brazil. From Rio de Janeiro she sailed to Sydney, Cape Breton, and St John, New Brunswick. From Canada she sailed via Cape Town and Durban to Suez, where she arrived on 22 January 1942. She passed through the Suez Canal to the eastern Mediterranean, where she called at Haifa in Palestine, Famagusta in Cyprus, and then returned to Port Said. Her return voyage was via the Suez Canal, with calls at Safaga, Durban, Cape Town, and Halifax, Nova Scotia, where she arrived with a cargo of grain. She left Halifax with Convoy SC 96, and reached the Thames Estuary off Southend on 31 August 1942.

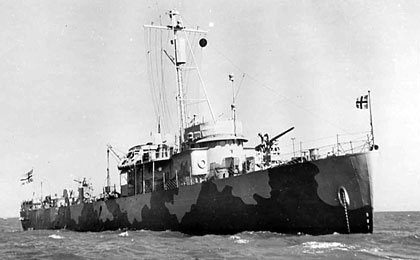
The Norwegian Submarine chaser King Haakon VII was one of the escorts of Convoy SC 108

Peleus made then another North Atlantic return trip. On 27 September 1942 she left the Thames Estuary, and via a series of convoys including ON 135 she reached Halifax, Nova Scotia. There she loaded grain, and returned with Convoy SC 108. She reached the Thames Estuary on 22 November 1942.

On 17 December 1942, Peleus left the Thames Estuary on what became a voyage of almost nine months. She joined Convoy ON 157, which took her across the North Atlantic to New York. From there, a series of convoys took her via Guantanamo Bay and Trinidad to Salvador in Brazil. From there, she sailed unescorted via via Walvis Bay to Cape Town. From there, two convoys took her via Durban into the Indian Ocean. She then continued unescorted via Colombo and Madras to Calcutta, where she arrived on 13 May 1943. She left Calcutta on 13 June, and sailed via Madras, Aden and the Suez Canal to Alexandria, where she arrived on 26 July. By then, the Allied invasion of Sicily was under way, and Allied convoys through the Mediterranean had resumed. Peleus joined Convoy GUS 11. This was bound for Hampton Roads in the US, but Peleus was one of 18 ships that detached for Gibraltar, where they joined Convoy MKS 21G to the Firth of Clyde. Peleus detached for Loch Ewe, whence she continued in coastal convoys via the Firth of Forth to the Tyne, where she arrived on 8 September 1943.

Peleus then made another North Atlantic return trip. She left the Tyne 3 October 1943, and sailed in convoys via the Firth of Forth and Loch Ewe, whence she joined Convoy ON 206. ON 206 was bound for New York, but Peleus and one other cargo ship detached for Sydney, Cape Breton, where she joined Convoy SQ 69 to the St. Lawrence River. On her return voyage she left the St. Lawrence with Convoy QS 71 to Sydney, Cape Breton, where she awaited an transatlantic eastbound convoy. She left Sydney with Convoy SC 147, which was bound for Liverpool. Peleus detached for Loch Ewe, whence she returned in convoys via the Firth of Forth to the Thames Estuary, where she arrived on 9 December 1943.

== Final voyage ==
On 22 December 1943, Peleus left the Thames Estuary in a coastal convoy to start what became her final voyage. She spent Christmas and New Year in Immingham on the Humber. She left the Humber on 7 January 1944. She sailed in coastal convoys via the Firth of Forth, Loch Ewe, and Oban, and then joined outbound Convoy OS 65 / KMS 39. Her cargo included coal. OS 65 and KMS 39 split on 26 January. Peleus continued with KMS 39, which passed Gibraltar. The convoy was bound for Port Said, but Peleus was one of six merchant ships that detached for Algiers, where she arrived on 30 January. A fortnight later, Peleus left Algiers to sail with Convoy GUS 30 as far as Gibraltar. There she detached to join Convoy OS 68, which took her to the anchorage off Freetown, where she arrived on 5 March 1944.

By March 1944, Peleus' ship's company was multi-national. 18 were Greek: her Master, Captain Minas Mavris, along with all three deck officers, all four engineer officers, the cook, the carpenter, one able seaman, three ordinary seamen, and one greaser. 13 were British: her wireless telegraph officer, her steward, her boatswain, two ordinary seamen, three stokers, one greaser, and all four of her Royal Navy gunners. Three firemen were Chinese, two were Egyptian, and one was Polish. The galley boy was Chilean, and one of the ordinary seamen was Russian. Her company numbered 39 men in total.

=== Loss ===
On 9 March 1944, Peleus left the anchorage off Freetown with Convoy STL 14, which was bound for Takoradi in Gold Coast. Peleus was in ballast, and detached from the convoy to cross the South Atlantic unescorted to Buenos Aires to load cargo.

U-852 sighted Peleus on 13 March, and followed her. At 19:40 that evening, the U-boat hit the cargo ship with two torpedoes: the first in her number two hold, and the second just aft of her number three hold. She sank rapidly at position 2°00′S 10°00′W, about 500 nautical miles (930 km) north of Ascension Island. Her crew was unable to launch either of her lifeboats in time, but some or all of liferafts floated free, along with other flotsam. Members of her crew who survived the sinking boarded the rafts, or clung to flotsam.

U-852 moved among the rafts and wreckage. Its commander, Heinz-Wilhelm Eck, took two survivors aboard the U-boat for questioning: Third Officer Agis Kefalas, and ordinary seaman Pierre Neuman. Having obtained Peleus' name and other details from the two prisoners, Eck returned them to a liferaft. The U-boat then spent about five hours that night moving among the rafts and débris, using grenades and machine gun fire to try to sink the rafts. According to one report, this attack killed 11 men who had survived the sinking: seven British, two Greek, and two Chinese. U-852 left the area at 01:00 on 14 March.

Four men in one raft survived the attack: Kefalas, plus Chief Officer Antonios Liossis, one seaman, and Rocco Said, who was one of Peleus' stokers. However, Kefalas' arm was wounded, and he later died. Their raft drifted for more than a month. A Portuguese cargo ship, Alexandre Silva, sighted the raft on 20 April, rescued the three survivors, and landed them at Lobito in Angola. Alexandre Silva was a motor ship, built in Lisbon in 1943.

== Aftermath ==
On 30 April 1944, an RAF bomber damaged U-852 with depth charges in the Arabian Sea. Eck set course for the coast of Italian Somaliland, but more RAF bombers attacked the U-boat, killing seven crewmen, and causing further damage, so Eck ran her aground on a coral reef several miles offshore. Eck and 57 other survivors made their way ashore, where the Somaliland Camel Corps captured them all.

After the war, in October 1945, Eck and four members of his crew were tried in Hamburg for war crimes before a British military judge, Major Melford Stevenson. A military jury of five British and two Greek officers found all five guilty. Eck was sentenced to death, as was his second in command August Hoffman, and his ship's doctor. They were executed by firing squad on 30 November. The U-boat's Chief Engineer, Hans Lenz, was sentenced to life imprisonment; and a seaman, Wolfgang Schwender, was sentenced to 15 years' imprisonment. Schwender was released in 1951, and Lenz in 1952.

The English novelist Gwyn Griffin based his novel An Operational Necessity, published in 1967, on the Peleus incident.

== Bibliography ==
- Blair, Clay (1998). Hitler's U-Boat War: The Hunted 1942–1945. London; New York: Cassell. ISBN 0-304-35261-6.
- Cameron, John, ed. (1948). The Peleus Trial. War Crime Trials. Vol. I. Edinburgh: William Hodge & Co.
- Griffin, Gwyn (1967). An Operational Necessity. New York: G. P. Putnam's Sons. ISBN 186046596X. LCCN 67-23127.
- Lloyd's Register of Shipping. Vol. II.–Steamers and Motorships. London: Lloyd's Register of Shipping. 1928 – via Internet Archive.
- Lloyd's Register of Shipping. Vol. II.–Steamers and Motorships of 300 tons gross and over. London: Lloyd's Register of Shipping. 1932 – via Southampton City Council.
- Lloyd's Register of Shipping. Vol. II.–Steamers and Motorships of 300 tons gross and over. London: Lloyd's Register of Shipping. 1934 – via Southampton City Council.
- Lloyd's Register of Shipping. Vol. I.–Steamers and Motorships of 300 tons, Trawlers, Tugs, Dredgers, etc. London: Lloyd's Register of Shipping. 1940 – via Southampton City Council.
- Lloyd's Register of Shipping. Vol. I.–Steamers and Motorships of 300 tons, Trawlers, Tugs, Dredgers, etc. London: Lloyd's Register of Shipping. 1944 – via Southampton City Council.
