= Alan Stewart Orr =

British barrister (1911–1991)

The Right Honourable Sir Alan Stewart Orr OBE
- Portrait by Walter Bird, 1965

Lord Justice of Appeal
- In office 1971–1980

Personal details
- Born: 21 February 1911 Rochford, Essex, England
- Died: 3 April 1991 (aged 80) Warwickshire, England
- Spouse: Mariana Frances Lilian Lang (m. 1933; died 1986)
- Children: 4
- Education: Fettes College
- Alma mater: University of Edinburgh; Balliol College, Oxford
- Occupation: Barrister

Military service
- Branch/service: Royal Air Force
- Years of service: 1940–1946
- Rank: Wing Commander
- Unit: Volunteer Reserve
- Battles/wars: Second World War
- Awards: Officer of the Order of the British Empire (1944); Mentioned in despatches (1946)

Sir Alan Stewart Orr, OBE (21 February 1911 – 3 April 1991) was a British barrister specialising in taxation who rose to be a High Court judge and a Lord Justice of Appeal. After 1958 he was known as Alan Orr QC, from 1965 as Mr Justice Orr, and from 1971 as Lord Justice Orr.

During the Second World War, Orr served in the Royal Air Force Volunteer Reserve, became a wing commander, and was appointed an Officer of the Order of the British Empire for his wartime service.

== Early life and education ==
Orr was born on 21 February 1911 to William Orr and Doris Kemsley, of Great Wakering, Essex, and was a grandson of the Rev. Robert Workman Orr, a United Free Church minister of Brechin. He was born in Rochford, Essex, and raised in Scotland. He was educated at Fettes College, then an all-boys independent boarding school in Edinburgh. He studied classics at the University of Edinburgh, where he graduated undergraduate Master of Arts (MA Hons) degree in 1933, before studying jurisprudence at Balliol College, Oxford and graduating with a first class honours Bachelor of Arts (BA) degree.

=== Military service ===
During the Second World War, he served in the Royal Air Force Volunteer Reserve. On 1 June 1940, he was commissioned as an acting pilot officer on probation in the Equipment Branch for the duration of hostilities. On 24 July 1940, he was regraded to pilot officer on probation. He was promoted to the war substantive rank of flying officer on 1 June 1941, and had his commission confirmed. He was promoted to temporary flight lieutenant on 1 September 1942, and to war substantive flight lieutenant on 23 October 1942. In the 1944 King's Birthday Honours, Acting Wing Commander Orr was appointed Officer of the Order of the British Empire (OBE). He was promoted to war substantive squadron leader on 15 November 1944. In the 1946 New Year Honours, it was published that he had been mentioned in despatches. On 21 February 1956, having spent a number of years in the inactive reserves, he relinquished his commission and was allowed to retain the rank of wing commander.

== Legal career ==
After graduating from Oxford, Orr joined the Middle Temple to train as a barrister. He was called to the English bar in July 1936.

Orr was a barrister in the chambers of Sir Wintringham Stable at 2, Crown Office Row, which in the 1970s moved premises and became known as Fountain Court Chambers. In the late 1940s and early 1950s, he started to build the chambers' reputation for commercial litigation, together with Leslie Scarman QC and Melford Stevenson QC, supported by a notable clerk, Cyril Batchelor. He was a member of the General Council of the Bar from 1953 to 1957. Well known as a "tax devil", Orr was raised to Queen's Counsel in 1958, and the same year was appointed as Recorder of New Windsor, a part-time judicial role.

By 1962, he had become head of his chambers. In April 1963, he was the Guest of Honour at the annual dinner of the Institute of Chartered Accountants of Scotland. In August 1964 he became a deputy chairman of the Oxfordshire Quarter Sessions.

In 1965 Orr was appointed as a High Court judge, joining the Probate, Divorce, and Admiralty Division, which was unusual, as he had only rarely appeared in it as a counsel. On 12 November 1965, he was knighted by Queen Elizabeth II at Buckingham Palace. In 1967 he was elected as a Master of the Bench of the Honourable Society of the Middle Temple.

On 20 April 1971, together with Sir John Stephenson, Orr was appointed a Lord Justice of Appeal. On the same day, Sir John Passmore Widgery was created Lord Widgery and became Lord Chief Justice. Judge Alfred Hollings QC was appointed to replace Orr in the Probate, Divorce, and Admiralty Division of the High Court, and Orr was also named as a member of the Privy Council of the United Kingdom.

Orr retired as a Lord Justice in 1980, shortly after a less senior man, Geoffrey Lane, had been chosen by the Lord Chancellor, Lord Hailsham, to succeed Widgery as Lord Chief Justice.

When he died in 1991, The Times said in its obituary:

"Alan Orr was a quiet unassuming judge of exceptional quality. His career reminds us that good judges do not need, and are often better without, a charismatic public personality. In court he listened, he perceived truth with a quick and accurate mind and he knew the law: the result was findings of fact based on a detailed and perceptive understanding of the evidence, with the law applied accurately and lucidly. Not many appeals against an Orr judgement succeeded. Few outside the legal profession and the business community knew of him: he did justice consistently – and that is not news."

=== Notable cases ===
In 1963 and 1964, Orr represented George Wigg, a Labour member of parliament, in a High Court action for libel against Angus Maude, a Conservative member. He won the case, and substantial damages were awarded.

In October 1966, the spy George Blake escaped from HM Prison Wormwood Scrubs and fled from Great Britain to the Soviet Union, and a month later his wife, with whom he had three children, began divorce proceedings against him. In the High Court in March 1967, Orr granted her a decree nisi in Blake's absence, on the grounds that the conviction of a spouse for treason can amount to cruelty or constructive desertion, and also awarded the custody of the couple's three sons to Mrs Blake.

On 17 December 1968, Orr granted the actress Britt Ekland a decree nisi for divorce on the grounds of cruelty by Peter Sellers, who did not contest the proceedings.

== Private life ==
In 1933, Orr married Mariana Frances Lilian, a daughter of Captain J. C. Lang, King's Own Scottish Borderers. In 1973 they were reported to be living at Highfield, Harmer Green, Welwyn, Hertfordshire. They had four sons James, Gavin, Mark, and Giles, and Lady Orr died in February 1986.

Orr was a member of the Oxford and Cambridge Club. He died on 3 April 1991 at Kineton Manor Nursing Home, Kineton, Warwickshire.

Portraits of Orr by Walter Bird and Rex Coleman of Baron Studios are in the National Portrait Gallery.
