= Loyola University Museum of Art =

Art museum in Chicago, Illinois

Loyola University Museum of Art (LUMA)
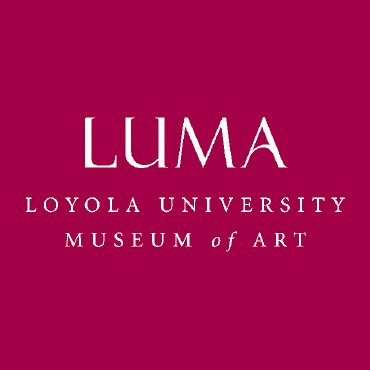
- Established: 2005
- Location: 820 North Michigan Avenue; Chicago, IL 60611 (United States)
- Coordinates: 41.8974°N 87.6251°W
- Type: Art
- Curator: Natasha Ritsma
- Website: www.luc.edu/luma/

The Loyola University Museum of Art (LUMA), which opened in the fall of 2005, is unique among Chicago's many museums for mounting exhibits that explore the spiritual in art from all cultures, faiths, and eras. LUMA is located on Loyola University Chicago's Water Tower Campus in downtown Chicago, at 820 North Michigan Ave.

LUMA's permanent collection comprises the Martin D'Arcy Collection of medieval, Renaissance, and Baroque art and objects ranging in date from 1150 to 1800. Established in 1969 by Donald Rowe, S.J., the collection contains over 300 pieces, including Ecce Homo. It was named after British humanist and Jesuit theologian Martin D'Arcy, S.J., who amassed an art collection at Campion Hall, Oxford University, in England. The collection was formerly located in the E.M. Cudahy Memorial Library on Loyola's Lake Shore Campus, in Rogers Park, Chicago.

== Selected exhibitions ==
- Caravaggio Una Mostra Impossibile (October 8, 2005 – February 11, 2006)
- Carlos Saura: Flamenco (February 18–March 27, 2006)
- The Missing Peace: Artists Consider the Dalai Lama (October 28, 2006 – January 15, 2007)
- A Blessing to One Another: Pope John Paul II and The Jewish People (April 14–August 12, 2007)
- Andy Warhol's Silver Clouds (February 16–April 27, 2008)
- Manifest Destiny/Manifest Responsibility: Environmentalism and the Art of the American Landscape (May 17–August 10, 2008)
- On the Same Map: Hope is a Human Right—A Photographic Journey of Partners in Health (November 29, 2008 – January 4, 2009)
- Rodin: In His Own Words—Selections from the Iris and B. Gerald Cantor Foundation (June 13–August 16, 2009)
- Back to the Future: Alfred Jensen, Charmion von Wiegand, Simon Gouverneur, and the Cosmic Conversation (September 12–November 15, 2009)
- Moholy: An Education of the Senses (February 10–May 9, 2010)
- The Papercut Haggadah by Archie Granot (February 10–May 9, 2010)
- Pilgrimage and Faith: Buddhism, Christianity, and Islam (August 21–November 14, 2010)
- Eric Gill: Iconographer (February 12–May 1, 2011)
- Inscribing the Divine: The Saint John's Bible (August 20–October 23, 2011)
- Heaven + Hell (February 10-June 30, 2012) a collaborative exhibition with Intuit: The Center for Intuitive and Outsider Art, Chicago
- Andra Samelson: Cosmologies (July 20 – November 3, 2013)
- Santitos (November 23, 2013 – January 12, 2014)
- Elegant Enigmas: The Art of Edward Gorey (February 15–June 15, 2014), Co-presented by the Loyola University Chicago Libraries.
- Shaker in Chicago (February 7–April 26, 2015), a dual exhibition presenting an overview of the history of the United Society of Believers for Christ’s Second Appearing, featuring Gather Up the Fragments: The Andrews Shaker Collection and As It Is in Heaven: The Legacy of Shaker Faith and Design
- William Utermohlen: A Persistence of Memory (February 6 – July 23, 2016)
- Wayang: The Art of Indonesian Puppetry (February 4, 2017 – June 3, 2017), Courtesy of the May Weber Collection, Loyola University Chicago.
- Steve Schapiro: Misericordia: Together We Celebrate (February 4, 2017 – June 3, 2017)
- Jeffrey Wolin: Pigeon Hill: Then and Now (July 1, 2017 – October 21, 2017)
- Susan Aurinko: Searching for Jehanne – the Joan of Arc Project (July 1, 2017 – October 21, 2017)
- Gregory Beals: They Arrived Last Night (February 6, 2018 – June 2, 2018)
- Her Story, My Dreams: The Images of Della Wells (February 6, 2018 – June 2, 2018)
- Tonika Lewis Johnson: Everyday Englewood (February 6, 2018 – June 2, 2018)

== Current exhibitions ==
- Following the Box (July 3 – October 20, 2018), curated by Alan Teller and Jerri Zbiral
- Tonika Lewis Johnson: Folded Map (July 3 – October 20, 2018)
- Victoria Martinez: Celestial House (July 3 – October 20, 2018)

== Annual exhibition ==
Art and Faith of the Crèche: The Collection of James and Emilia Govan shows how artists across the globe depict the nativity with clothes, architecture, and figures from their native lands. This show has run every year around Christmas since 2007, and features nativity scenes from around the world.

== Selected artists ==
- Mary Abbott
- Caravaggio
- David Lee Csicsko
- Arthur Dove
- Stephen Fredericks
- Edward Gorey
- Martin Johnson Heade
- Steve Jablonski
- Wenzel Jamnitzer
- William Smith Jewett
- Gary Kolb
- Joan Mitchell
- Robert Motherwell
- Nicario Jimenez Quispe
- Steve Schapiro
- Shawn Stucky
- Qes Adamu Tesfaw
- Andy Warhol

== Resources ==
- Official website
