= Ein Shemer Airfield =

Air base in Israel

- מחנה עין שמר
- Hadera, Haifa District in Israel
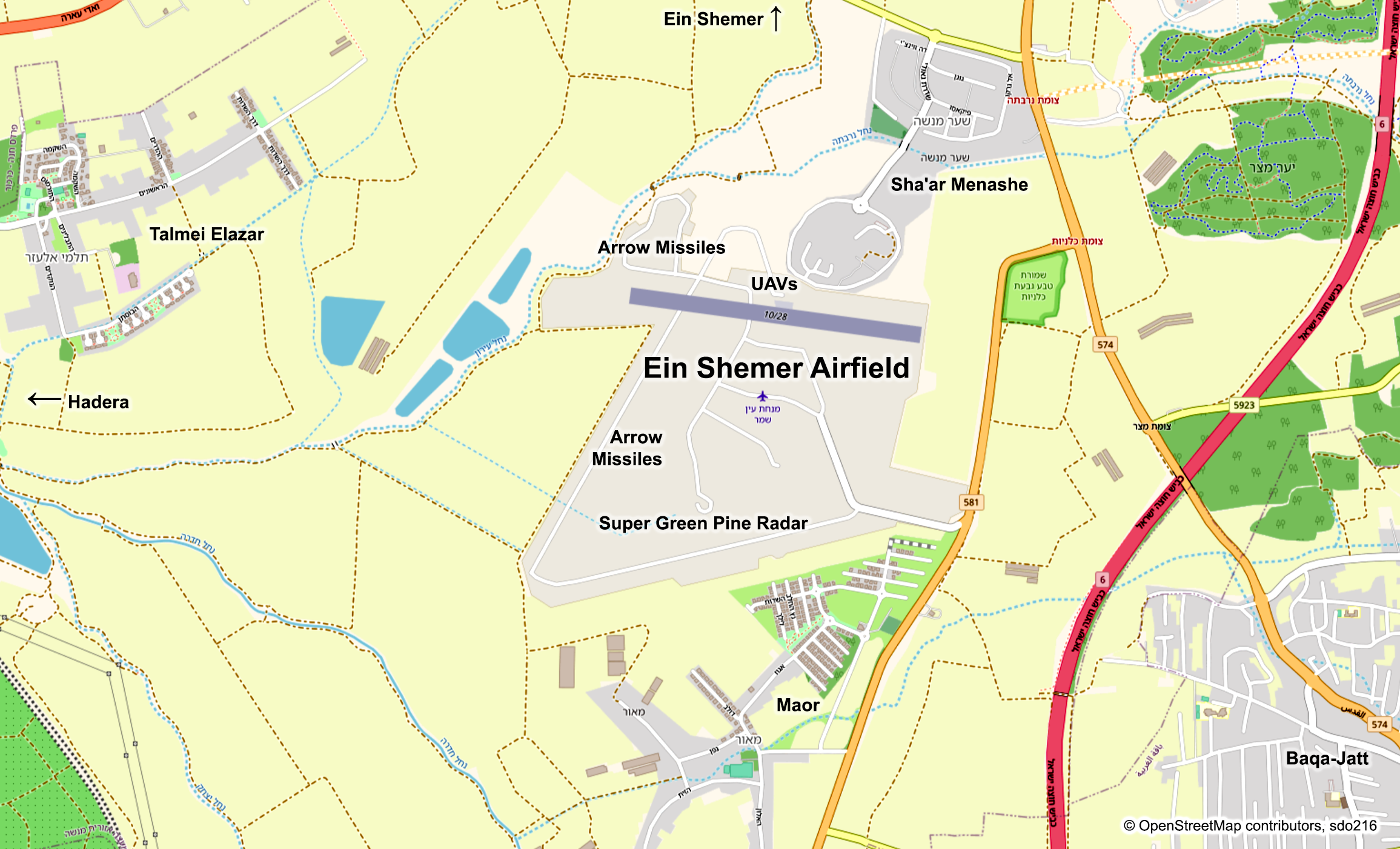

Site information
- Type: Airbase
- Owner: Israel Defense Forces
- Operator: Israeli Air Force

Location
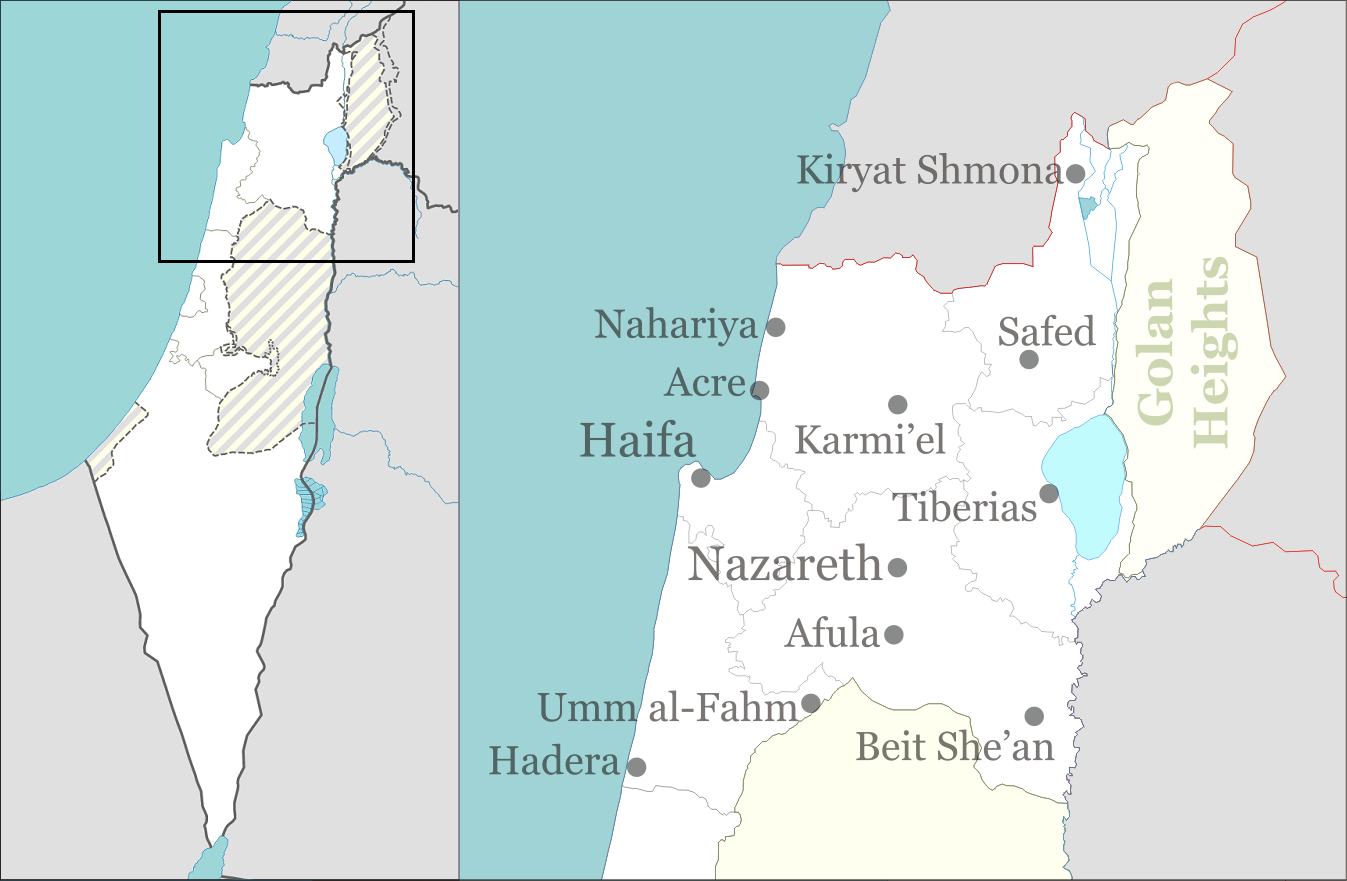
- Shown within Israel Ein Shemer Airfield (Israel)
- Coordinates: 32.440814°N 35.007937°E

Site history
- Built: 1942 RAF / 1948 IAF
- In use: 1942 - present

Airfield information
- Identifiers: IATA: HDA, ICAO: LLES
- Elevation: 29 metres (95 ft) AMSL
Runways
Direction	Length and surface
10/28	1,216 metres (3,990 ft) Asphalt

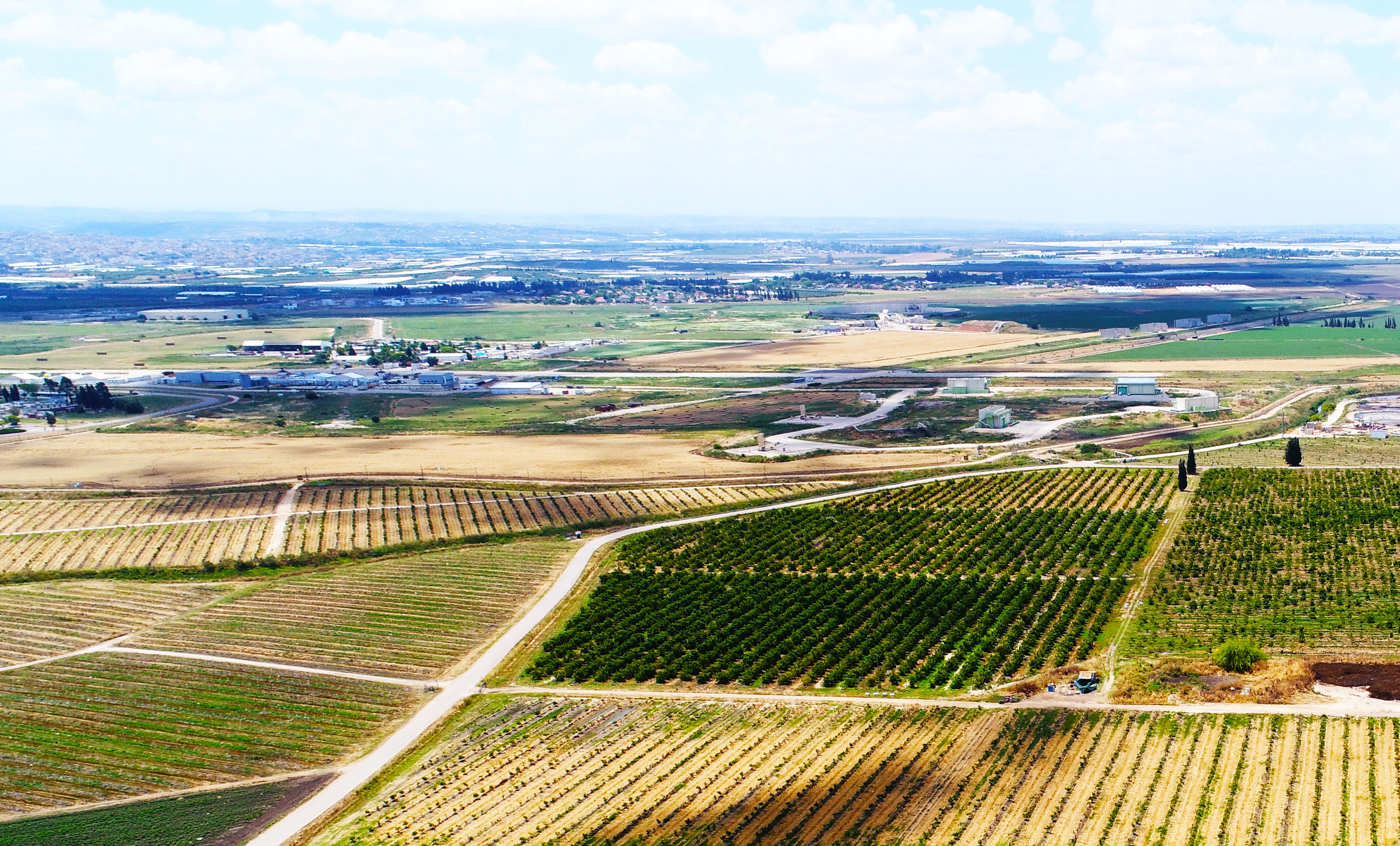
Aerial view of the airfield in 2020 with the Arrow missile sites to the right and the radar above

Ein Shemer Airfield (Hebrew: מחנה עין שמר, English: Shemer's Source) is an Israeli Air Force (IAF) base in northern Israel, located approximately 6 km east of Hadera in the Haifa District, named after the nearby kibbutz Ein Shemer. It houses no fighter jets or helicopters but UAVs for testing and an Arrow defense missile battery with long-range radar.

== History ==
=== RAF Ein Shemer ===
Between 1942 and 1948 it was operated by the British Royal Air Force (RAF) as RAF Ein Shemer. During this time, "RAF Ein Shemer was the largest military airfield in the country" and hosted "seven ..RAF squadrons and 1,500 RAF personnel." Between the autumn of 1943 and June 1945, it was home to 78 Operational Training Unit training general reconnaissance crews, particularly using ASV radar and the Leigh light. It served as the workplace for as many as 600, mainly Arab, workers. This made it, in the opinion of its Commanding Officer, ‘the largest camp of its sort for civilian labour in the Middle East’.

No. 78 Operational Training Unit RAF was formed in February 1944 at Ein Shemer to train general reconnaissance crews, particularly using ASV radar and the Leigh light.

The squadrons operated from here:

- No. 6 Squadron RAF between 2 June and 3 October 1946 with the Hawker Hurricane IV & Supermarine Spitfire LF.9
- No. 32 Squadron RAF between 3 October 1946 and 25 March 1948 with the Supermarine Spitfire IX and FR.18
- No. 37 Squadron RAF between 14 September 1947 and 31 March 1948 with the Avro Lancaster MR.3
- No. 38 Squadron RAF between July 1946 and 31 March 1948 with the Avro Lancaster GR.3
- No. 178 Squadron RAF between 25 August and 5 November 1945 with the Consolidated Liberator VI
- No. 208 Squadron RAF between 6 June 1946 and 26 March 1948 with the Supermarine Spitfire FR.18
- No. 214 Squadron RAF between 24 August and 7 November 1945 with the Consolidated Liberator VIII
- No. 621 Squadron RAF between 6 June and 1 September 1946 with the Avro Lancaster ASR.3 became No. 18 Squadron RAF between 1 and 15 September 1946 with Avro Lancaster GR.3
- No. 651 Squadron RAF between February 1946 and June 1947 with the Taylorcraft Auster V and Auster AOP.6
- No. 680 Squadron RAF between 9 July and 1 September 1946 with the de Havilland Mosquito PR.34 became No. 13 Squadron RAF between 1 September and 13 December 1946 with the de Havilland Mosquito PR.34

=== Post RAF use ===
After the British withdrew in 1948, the airfield was reduced in size and operated as a small civilian airfield for decades, which the Israeli military took ownership of again as a base in the early 2000s. The runway may only be used by unmanned aircraft, and any other use requires approval from the Civil Aviation Authority, due to strong resistance from the local residents.

In 2008 and again in 2012, the Israeli government proposed closing down Sde Dov and Herzlia airports and relocating their general aviation and civilian flight training activities to an expanded Ein Shemer airfield. Nearby residents however expressed strong opposition to the plan. In June 2019 the National Infrastructure Planning Committee voted to approve the plan but the local and regional municipalities vowed to continue opposing it.

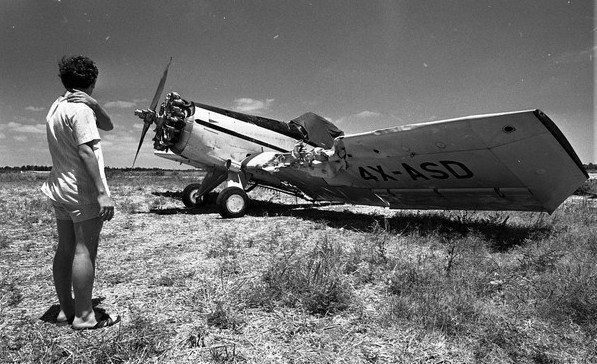
Collision between a crop sprayer and a tractor near Ein Shemer in 1970

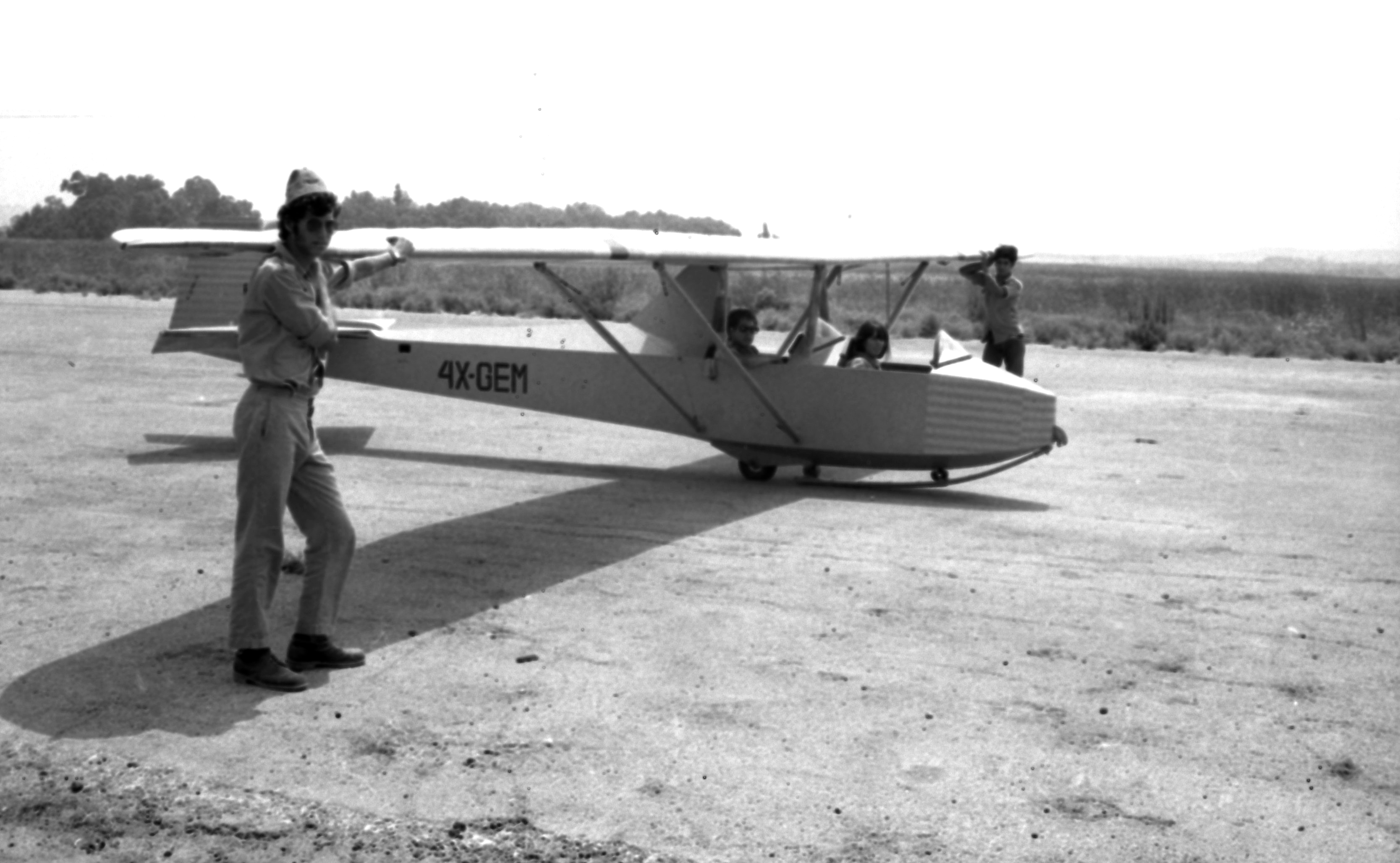
Young people learn to operate a glider at Ein Shemer in 1971

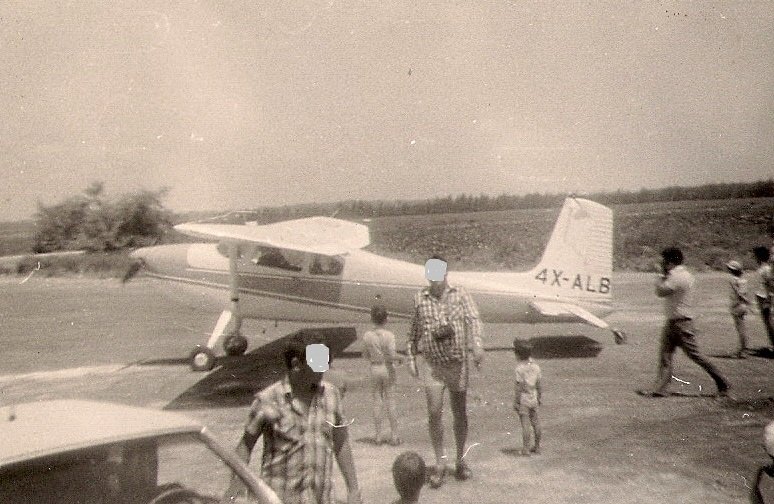
A Cessna 180 in 1979 at Ein Shemer Airfield

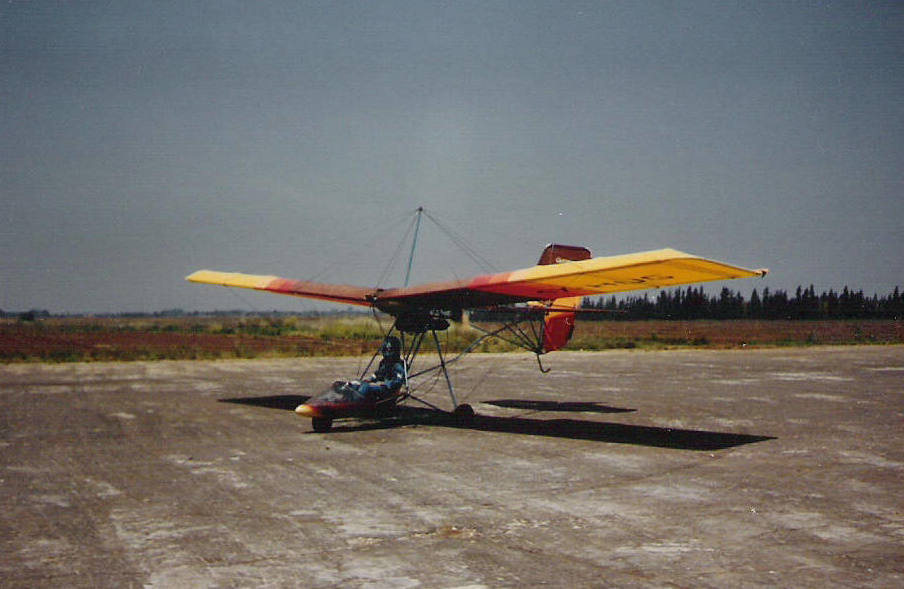
An ultralight aircraft at Ein Shemer Airfield in 1986

== Today ==
Since 2002 the base houses a complete Arrow 2 Theater Anti Ballistic Missile battery which includes around 150-200 Arrow 2 Block 4 missiles, several launchers, the Great Pine Radar (Super Green Pine) with a 1000 kilometer range and the Yellow Citron & Brown Nut elements of the system. The Arrow System is operated by the Israeli Air Defense Command, a unit of the Israeli Air Force (IAF). The upgraded Arrow 3 system has also been deployed there since 2017.

The airfield is also the home of a control station for the IAI Heron UAV and got several hangars for their accommodation and maintenance. The IAI Malat Division is testing its newly developed UAVs here. In September 2020, a Heron started from here and landed at Ben Gurion International Airport during commercial flight operations, a first for a UAV. The unmanned flight then returned to Ein Shemer Airfield and was controlled from there throughout the entire operation.

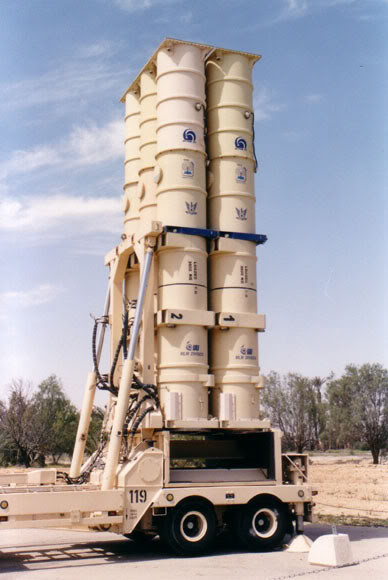
A mobile Arrow 2 launcher in 2012

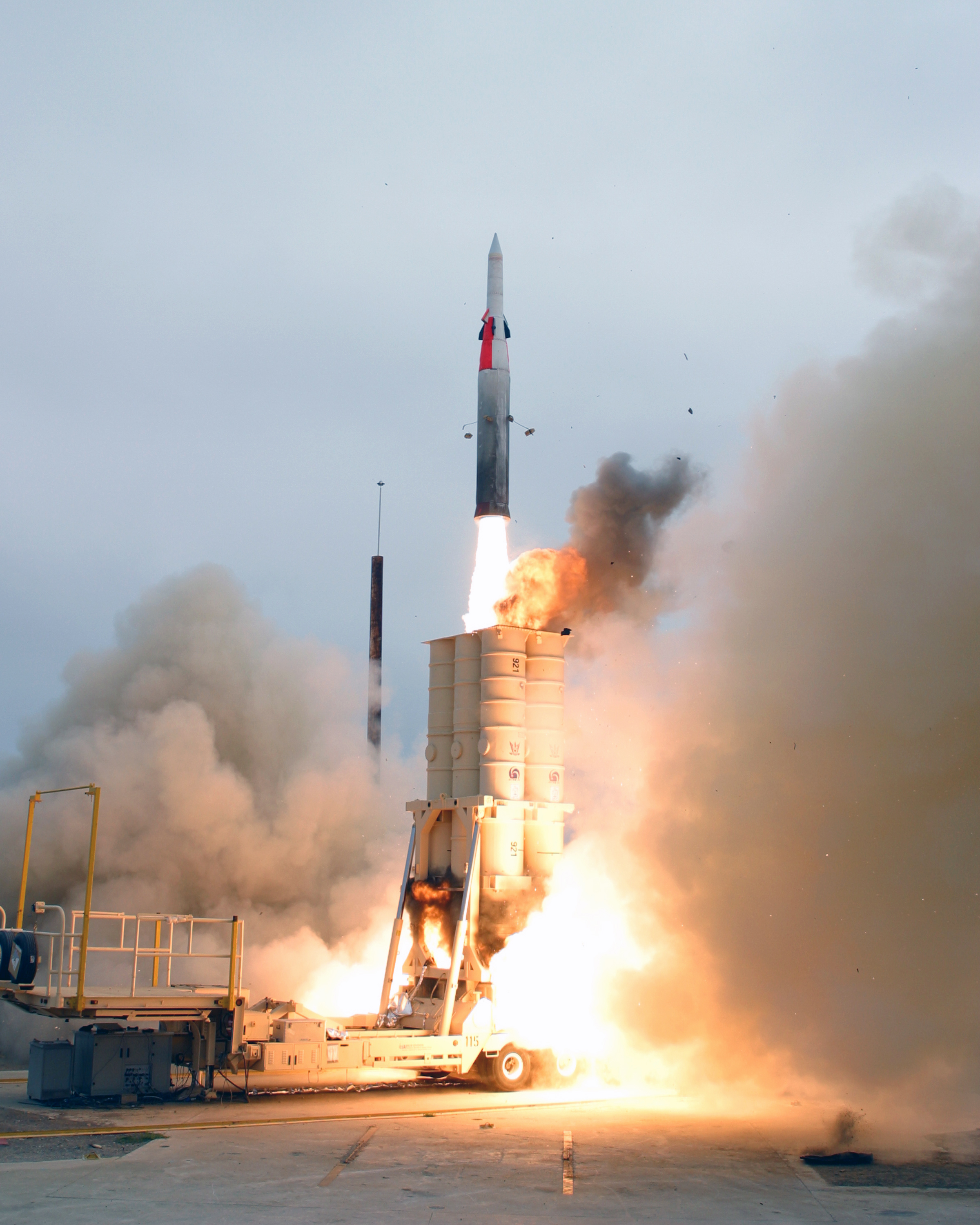
Test launch of an Arrow 2 missile in California 2004

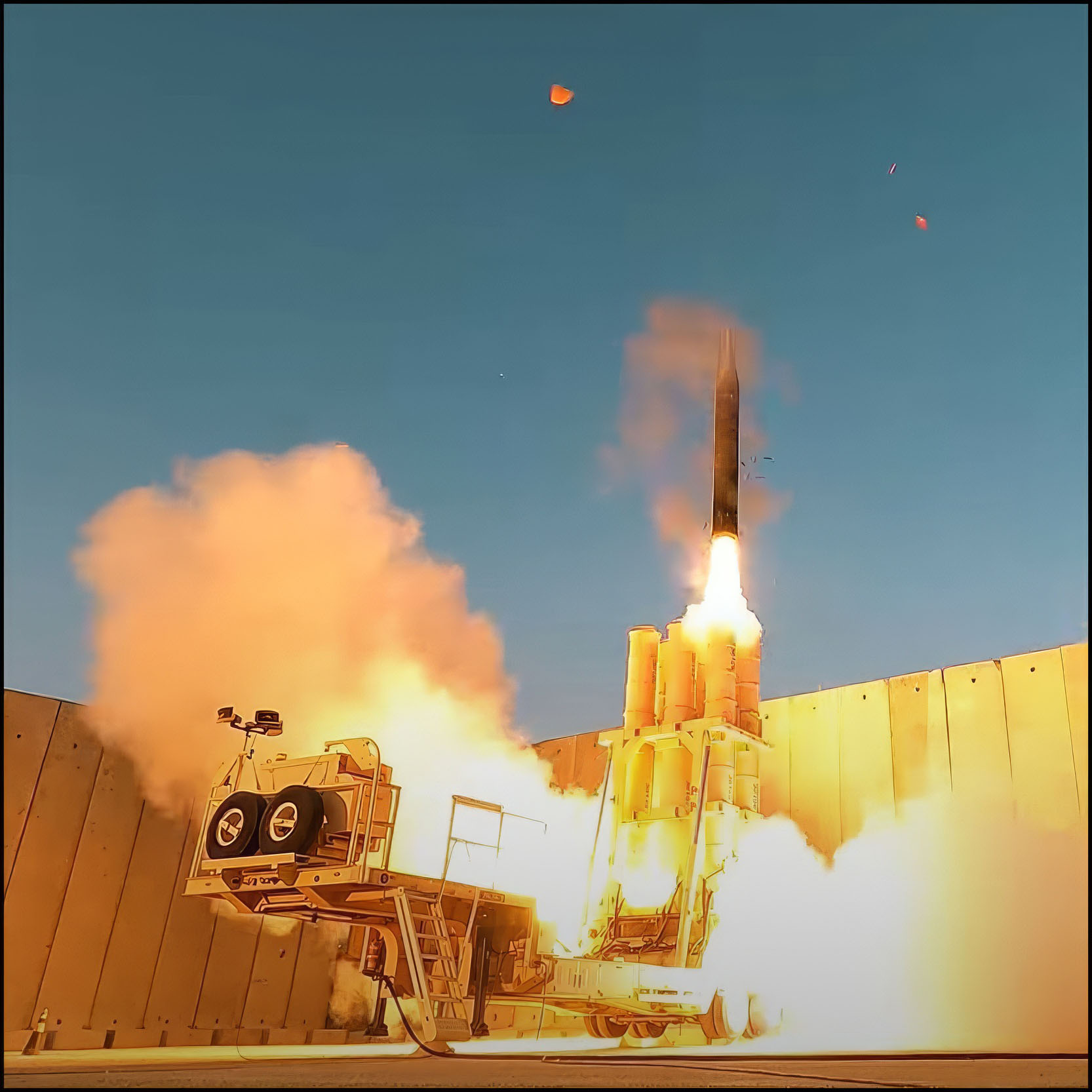
Launch of an Arrow 3 missile in June 2025 during the Iran–Israel war

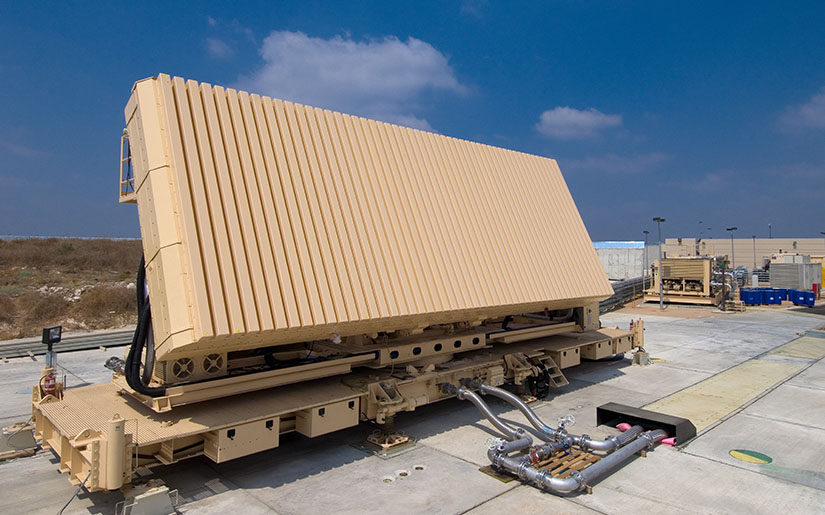
EL/M-2080 Green Pine radar antenna

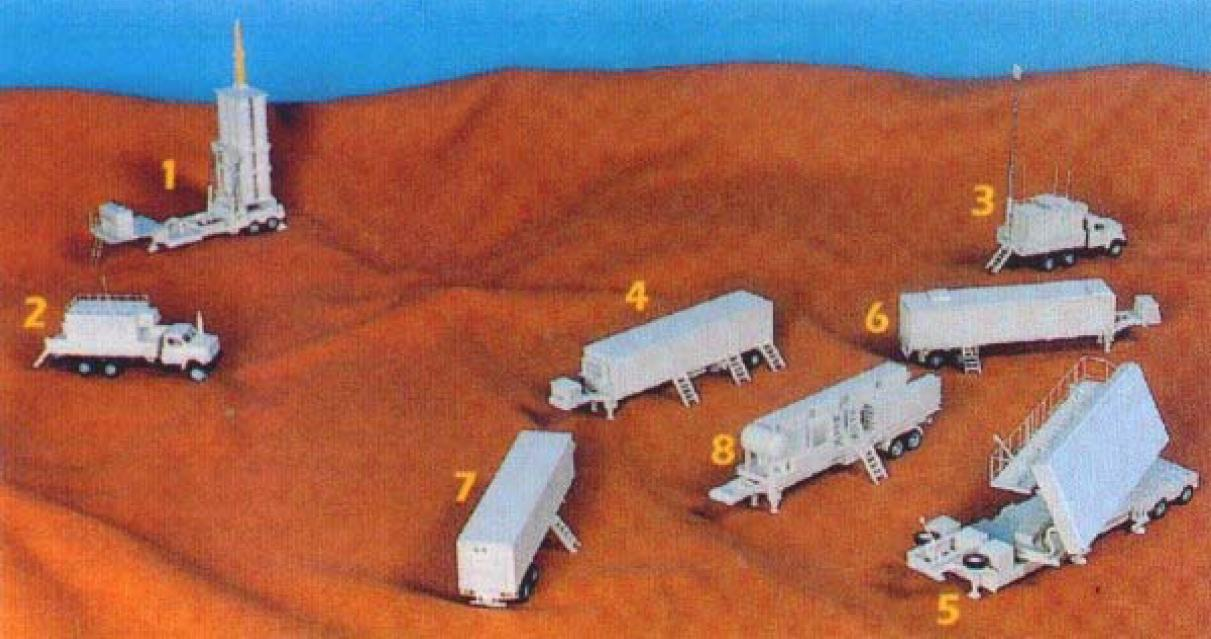
Model of the Arrow 2 missile system with the Green Pine radar

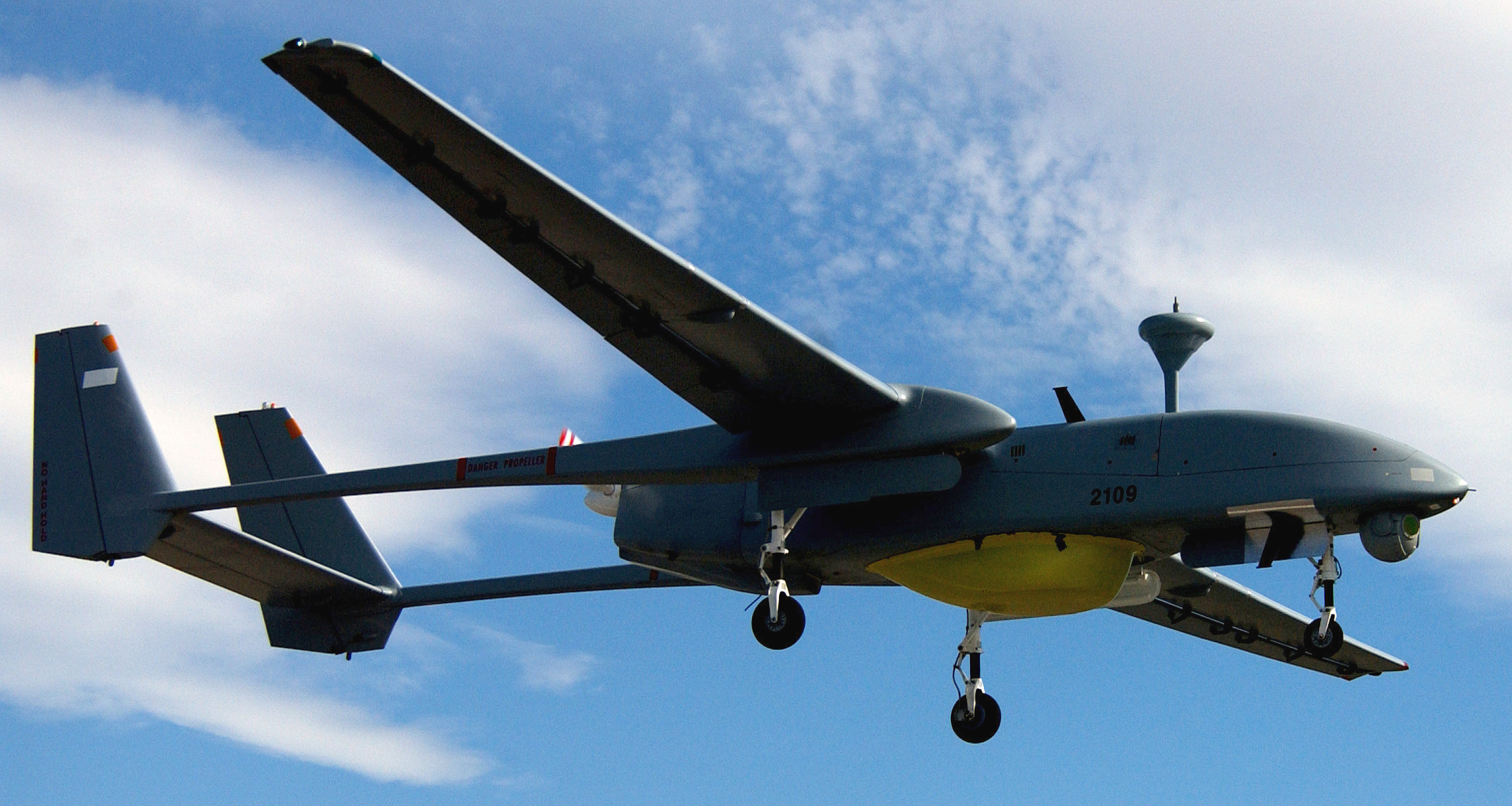
An IAI Heron 1 Shoval UAV in flight 2003

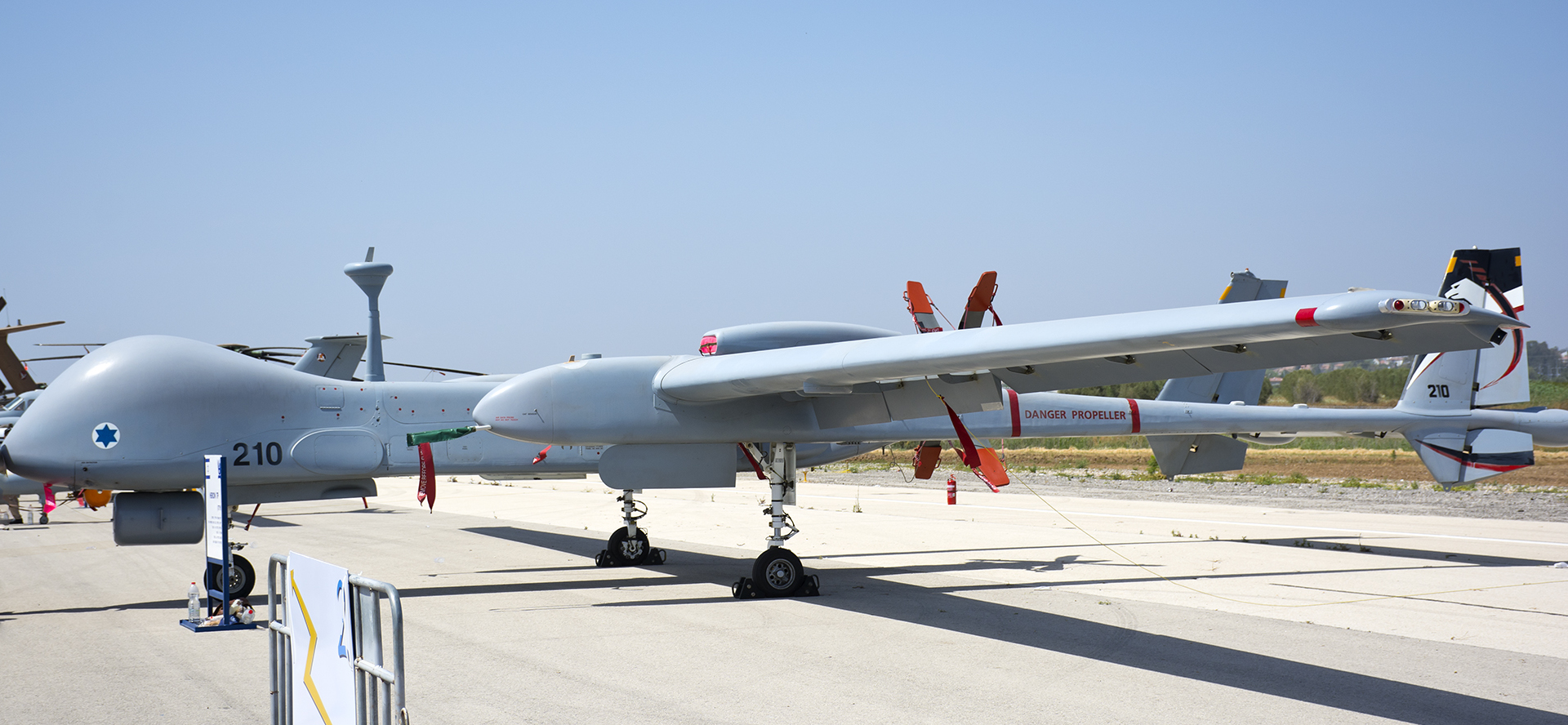
An IAI Heron TP Eitan UAV at an exhibition 2017

== See also ==
- List of former Royal Air Force stations
