= Owen Stable =

British judge (1923–2019)

Owen Stable QC JP

Personal details
- Born: Rondle Owen Charles Stable; 1923
- Died: 2019 (aged 95–96)

Rondle Owen Charles Stable (1923 - 2019) was a British judge, who served as senior presiding judge at Snaresbrook Crown Court. He was the son of High Court judge Sir Wintringham Stable.

== Inspection into the conduct of Robert Maxwell ==
Between 1971 and 1973, Stable acted as an inspector for the Department of Trade and Industry on the conduct of Robert Maxwell in relation to Pergamon Press. The inspection report, co-authored with accountant Sir Ronald Leach found that "a large number of private companies including foreign companies exist in which Mr. Maxwell or his family have an interest.".

The report concluded with the words, "We are also convinced that Mr Maxwell regarded his stewardship duties fulfilled by showing the maximum profits which any transaction could be devised to show. Furthermore, in reporting to shareholders and investors he had a reckless and unjustified optimism which enabled him on some occasions to disregard unpalatable facts and on others to state what he must have known to be untrue ... We regret having to conclude that, notwithstanding Mr Maxwell's acknowledged abilities and energy, he is not in our opinion a person who can be relied on to exercise proper stewardship of a publicly quoted company."

== Prominent cases ==
Stable acted as QC for the prosecution in the trial of Peter Hain, in relation to four charges pertaining to the illegal disruption of events involving South African sports teams. Hain was subsequently fined £200 for criminal damage for his role in a sit-down protest to disrupt a 1969 Davis Cup tie between Britain and South Africa in Bristol. Speaking at the trial, Stable argued that "Mr Hain would appear to hold the view that, provided the object is a proper object, methods may be used regardless of the law to which he is subject. That is a terribly dangerous philosophy."

Judge Stable gave a deferred sentence to Lord Bristol, offering the peer a chance to beat his drug addiction to avoid imprisonment.

On 16 December 1994, while sentencing three young offenders for joyriding, Judge Stable advocated the use of the "rattan cane" as a deterrent as "it would not only deter you but would deter a lot of other young men."
