= State of the Nation (TV series) =

State of the Nation is a series of investigative journalism programmes produced by Granada Television in the United Kingdom between 1966 and 1988.

== Reports ==
Broadcast date	Name	Duration	Notes	Ref(s)
31 August 1966	Hypotheticals	35 minutes		
21 June 1967	Harold Wilson	60 minutes		
23 July 1973	A Law in the Making: Four Months Inside a Ministry			
24 July 1973	Law-making and Public Money: Has Parliament Lost Control?			
25 July 1973	A Debate: Are MPs too Ignorant to do their Job?			
13 June 1976	Labour's Land Policy 1964			
15 February 1976	Education			
15 February 1977	The Cabinet and the Loan	60 minutes		
16 June – 22 July 1979	The Bounds of Freedom		A six-part series	
