= German submarine U-852 =

German World War II submarine

History

Nazi Germany
- Name: U-852
- Ordered: 20 January 1941
- Builder: DeSchiMAG AG Weser, Bremen
- Yard number: 1058
- Laid down: 15 April 1942
- Launched: 28 January 1943
- Commissioned: 15 June 1943
- Fate: Scuttled on 3 May 1944

General characteristics
- Class & type: Type IXD2 submarine
- Displacement: 1,610 t (1,580 long tons) surfaced; 1,799 t (1,771 long tons) submerged
- Length: 87.58 m (287 ft 4 in) o/a; 68.50 m (224 ft 9 in) pressure hull
- Beam: 7.50 m (24 ft 7 in) o/a; 4.40 m (14 ft 5 in) pressure hull
- Height: 10.20 m (33 ft 6 in)
- Draught: 5.40 m (17 ft 9 in)
- Installed power: 9,000 PS (6,620 kW; 8,880 bhp) (diesels); 1,000 PS (740 kW; 990 shp) (electric)
- Propulsion: 2 shafts; 2 × diesel engines; 2 × electric motors
- Speed: 20.8 knots (38.5 km/h; 23.9 mph) surfaced; 6.9 knots (12.8 km/h; 7.9 mph) submerged
- Range: 12,750 nmi (23,610 km; 14,670 mi) at 10 knots (19 km/h; 12 mph) surfaced; 57 nmi (106 km; 66 mi) at 4 knots (7.4 km/h; 4.6 mph) submerged
- Test depth: 230 m (750 ft)
- Complement: 55 to 63
- Armament: 6 × torpedo tubes (four bow, two stern); 24 × 53.3 cm (21 in) torpedoes; 1 × 10.5 cm (4.1 in) SK C/32 deck gun (150 rounds); 1 × 3.7 cm (1.5 in) SK C/30; 1 × 2 cm (0.79 in) C/30 anti-aircraft gun

Service record
- Part of: 4th U-boat Flotilla; 15 June 1943 – 31 January 1944; 12th U-boat Flotilla; 1 February – 3 May 1944
- Identification codes: M 52 771
- Commanders: Kptlt. Heinz-Wilhelm Eck; 15 June 1943 – 3 May 1944
- Operations: 1 patrol: 18 January – 3 May 1944
- Victories: 2 merchant ships sunk (9,972 GRT)

German submarine U-852 was a Type IXD2 U-boat built for Nazi Germany's Kriegsmarine during World War II. The submarine, which was a special long-range version of the Type IX, had four bow and two stern torpedo tubes and a Focke-Achgelis Fa 330 Bachstelze cable-towed lookout gyroglider. She was laid down in Bremen and completed in June 1943. She was commanded by Kapitänleutnant Heinz-Wilhelm Eck, who led her through her sea trials and onto her first war patrol on 18 January 1944.

Eck and his officers were the only Kriegsmarine submariners to be tried for war crimes at the end of World War II in Europe. They were convicted at a British military tribunal in Hamburg, held concurrently during the Nuremberg Trials, for killing the survivors of the torpedoed Greek steamer Peleus in 1944.

== Design ==
German Type IXD2 submarines were considerably larger than the original Type IXs. U-852 had a displacement of 1,610 tonnes (1,580 long tons) when at the surface and 1,799 tonnes (1,771 long tons) while submerged. The U-boat had a total length of 87.58 m (287 ft 4 in), a pressure hull length of 68.50 m (224 ft 9 in), a beam of 7.50 m (24 ft 7 in), a height of 10.20 m (33 ft 6 in), and a draught of 5.35 m (17 ft 7 in). The submarine was powered by two MAN M 9 V 40/46 supercharged four-stroke, nine-cylinder diesel engines plus two MWM RS34.5S six-cylinder four-stroke diesel engines for cruising, producing a total of 9,000 metric horsepower (6,620 kW; 8,880 shp) for use while surfaced, and two Siemens-Schuckert 2 GU 345/34 double-acting electric motors producing a total of 1,000 shaft horsepower (1,010 PS; 750 kW) for use while submerged. She had two shafts and two 1.85 m (6 ft) propellers. The boat was capable of operating at depths of up to 200 metres (660 ft).

The submarine had a maximum surface speed of 20.8 knots (38.5 km/h; 23.9 mph) and a maximum submerged speed of 6.9 knots (12.8 km/h; 7.9 mph). When submerged, the boat could operate for 121 nautical miles (224 km; 139 mi) at 2 knots (3.7 km/h; 2.3 mph); when surfaced, she could travel 12,750 nautical miles (23,610 km; 14,670 mi) at 10 knots (19 km/h; 12 mph). U-852 was fitted with six 53.3 cm (21 in) torpedo tubes (four fitted at the bow and two at the stern), 24 torpedoes, one 10.5 cm (4.13 in) SK C/32 naval gun, 150 rounds, and a 3.7 cm (1.5 in) SK C/30 with 2575 rounds as well as one 2 cm (0.79 in) C/30 anti-aircraft gun with 8100 rounds. The boat had a complement of fifty-five.

== Asian mission ==
=== Peleus ===
In early 1944, the Kriegsmarine dispatched U-852 on a top-secret mission to disrupt the Allied Far East war effort by attacking sea lanes in the Indian Ocean. To do this, the submarine needed to maintain a high-level of secrecy throughout her journey from Europe. On 13 March while crossing the latitude of Freetown in the Atlantic Ocean, the U-boat spotted the lone Greek steamer Peleus. Eck, despite his mission, decided to attack the ship. After stalking her until nightfall, the steamer was sunk with two torpedoes.

However, the sinking of the Peleus had created a large debris field containing survivors in rafts and clinging to wreckage. Eck decided that this would indicate to any Allied shipping patrol aircraft that there was a U-boat in the area, so he ordered his junior officers to destroy the wreckage by firing into it using hand grenades and automatic weapons. They did this while the rest of the crew remained below decks. There were only three survivors from the 35-man Peleus.

=== Dahomian ===
Two weeks later the U-852 sank the British cargo ship Dahomian off Cape Town on 1 April. This time the U-852 left rather than attack the survivors.

== Capture ==
On 30 April 1944, U-852 was spotted in the Indian Ocean by a Vickers Wellington bomber flying from Aden. After being left unable to dive due to damage from aerial depth charges, she headed for the coast of Somalia. However, before reaching land the U-boat came under attack from six RAF bombers from 621 Squadron. Eck was forced to run aground on a coral reef (9°32′N 50°59′E) about 20 km (12 mi) from shore. Seven crewmen were lost in the engagement; the remainder fled ashore. Fifty-eight were captured by the Somaliland Camel Corps and local militia.

A British boarding party examined the wrecked U-boat and retrieved Eck's Kriegstagebuch ("War Diary"), which proved crucial in constructing the Allied case against him and his men. The British also discovered the Fa 330 Bachstelze rotor kite, a towed one-man aerial observation platform.

== War crimes trial ==
In November 1945, Eck and the U-852's four junior officers were tried by the British at a special military tribunal in Hamburg for killing the crew from the Peleus. The German commander said he carried out the attack because there might have been communications equipment on the survivors’ rafts and the Laconia Order forbade him from helping the crews of sunk enemy ships. However, the British tribunal rejected his plea of “operational necessity” and sentenced him to death. Despite claiming they were "only following orders", the boat's second-in-command, August Hoffmann, and Walter Weisspfennig, the ship's doctor (who was condemned for using a weapon in contravention of the Geneva Convention) were also given the death penalty.

Hans Lenz, the engineering officer, who had opposed Eck's order but eventually carried it out was given a life sentence (but was released seven years later, in 1952). Wolfgang Schwender, an enlisted engineer, who said he only shot at debris not survivors - until being replaced by the reluctant Lenz - received 15 years (but was released six years later, in 1951). On 30 November 1945, Eck, Hoffmann and Weisspfennig were executed by naval firing squad.

== Summary of raiding history ==
Date	Ship Name	Nationality	Tonnage (GRT)	Fate
13 March 1944	Peleus	Greece	4,695	Sunk
1 April 1944	Dahomian	United Kingdom	5,277	Sunk

== See also ==
- German submarine U-247, HMS Torbay and USS Wahoo for other boats alleged to be involved in war crimes.
