= Nardo Zalko =

Argentine-French journalist, author, researcher

- Born: October 1, 1941; Buenos Aires, Argentina
- Died: June 2, 2011 (aged 69); Paris, France
- Occupations: Journalist, author, researcher and tango historian
- Years active: 1960–2011

Nardo Zalko (October 1, 1941 – June 2, 2011) was an Argentine-French journalist, author, researcher, and historian of tango.

== Early life ==
Zalko was born in October 1941 to a Lithuanian couple, Frida and Abrasha Zalko, who migrated to Argentina. He was raised in the porteño neighbourhood of San Cristobal, Buenos Aires. From the age of 19 wrote for the Uruguayan weekly newspaper, Marcha, published in Montevideo, and reported on events for them such as the Eichmann trial held in Jerusalem in 1961.

== Career ==
Zalko moved to Paris with his wife and three-year-old son in 1970. In 1979, he became a journalist for Agence France-Presse (AFP), where he eventually became the shift manager of the South America department, Desk AmSud. He retired from the AFP as the head of AmSud in 2006.

In 1996, Zalko became editor-in-chief of Tango, Bulletin de l'Académie du Tango de France, a publication that printed rare documents, phonograph records, sheet music, books, pictures, and photographs about tango. Through this work, Zalko interviewed many musicians, singers, and dancers, including Astor Piazzolla and Susana Rinaldi. This collection is now housed in the Centre National de la Danse (CND) in Paris.

In 1998, Zalko published his first book about tango, Paris – Buenos Aires, Un Siècle de Tango (published by Éditions du Félin), in which he documented the music, dance, lyrics, and culture of tango, and the relationship it created between the cities of Paris and Buenos Aires. In the book, Zalko argues that tango had to become popular in Paris to eventually experience a revival in its birthplace of Buenos Aires. The book contains 66 illustrations, including rare ones from Zalko's personal collection among them tango poetry, sheet music, postcards, drawings, satirical cartoons and photographs, to complement the text. The book was chosen by the French Ministry of National Education as a subject for the baccalauréat (the general matriculation exams) in 2015. His next book, Le Tango, Passion du Corps et de l’Esprit, was published by Milan Presse in 2001.

According to historian Julio Nudler, Zalko was the first author to conduct a serious investigation on the development of the tango in Paris. Zalko is considered to be an expert in his field by tango researchers; his work, in particular, the book Paris-Buenos Aires: Un Siècle de Tango/ Paris-Buenos Aires: Un Siglo de Tango, has been cited in various books, articles, and theses.

In Paris, in conjunction with the Pompidou Center, Zalko led a series of tours of places having a connection to tango. In 2005, he was appointed Parisian ambassador of Academia Porteña del Lunfardo.

Zalko died in Paris in 2011 and was buried in Montparnasse Cemetery. In attendance at the funeral were Zalko's family – widow: Dr. Hagar Shemi Zalko, Ph.D. in art history; son: Dr. Daniel Zalko, doctor of toxicology, research director at Institut national de recherche pour l'agriculture, l'alimentation et l'environnement (INRAE); daughter: Aline Zalko, artist, illustrator and graduate of L'École nationale supérieure des Arts Décoratifs (ENSAD) school of visual arts. He was honoured by a tribute at the Argentine Embassy in Paris several months after his death.

In 2017 the personal archives of Nardo Zalko (books, documents, musical scores, letters, various iconographic sources, tango records, etc.) was placed in the CND (Centre national de la danse), the National Dance Center in France.

== Publications ==
=== Books ===
- Crepusculo en La Habana [Twilight in Havana], Buenos Aires: Catalogos, 1993, ISBN 950-9314-86-2.
- Paris – Buenos Aires, Un Siècle de Tango [Paris – Buenos Aires, One Hundred Years of Tango; French language edition], Paris: Du Félin, 1998, ISBN 2-86645-325-5. Reprinted in 2004, ISBN 2-86645-569-X. Reprinted in paperback in 2016, ISBN 978-2866458454.
- Le Tango, Passion du Corps et de l’Esprit [Tango, Passion of the Body and the Spirit], Oban, France: Milan Presse, 2001, ISBN 2-7459-0196-6.
- Paris – Buenos Aires, Un Siglo de Tango [Paris – Buenos Aires, One Hundred Years of Tango; Spanish language edition], Buenos Aires: Corregidor, 2001, ISBN 9500513137.

=== Group publications ===
- Danses Latines [Latin Dances], Paris: Autrement, 2001
- Tango y Lunfardo [Tango and Lunfardo], Buenos Aires: Dunke, 2002, ISBN 987-02-0108-3

=== CDs ===
- Paris – Buenos Aires, collection of tangos selected by Nardo Zalko. Paris: Du Félin, 1998, Ref. 935770–9.

== Films about Zalko ==
- Paris le Tango Buenos Aires, director: Odile Fillion, 2007
- Nardo Zalko. Paris – Buenos Aires. Un Siècle de Tango, director: Claude Namer and Manu Petit, 2010

== Journalism ==
- Correspondent in Paris for Marcha, Montevideo – 1970–1974
- Reporter for Clarin, Buenos Aires; Mondo Nuevo, Caracas; La Vanguardia, Medellin; Amitiés France-Israel, Paris – 1974–1979
- Reporter for El Universal and El Nacional, Mexico; El Herald, Miami; El Carabobeño, Valencia; El Tiempo, Bogota – 1980–1991
- Editor-in-chief of the periodical Tango, Bulletin de l'Académie du Tango de France, Paris – 1996
