= No. 621 Squadron RAF =

- Active: 12 Sep 1943 – 1 Sep 1946
- Country: United Kingdom
- Branch: Royal Air Force
- Role: Reconnaissance; Air-sea rescue
- Part of: British Forces Aden
- Motto: Ever Ready to Strike

Insignia
- Squadron Badge heraldry: A hooded cobra

No. 621 Squadron RAF was a reconnaissance squadron of the Royal Air Force during World War II, flying from Somaliland and Aden. It was after the war stationed in Egypt and Palestine and tasked with air-sea rescue and was also active in Operation Sunburn, looking for illegal immigrants.

== History ==
No. 621 Squadron RAF was formed at Port Reitz, Kenya, on 12 September 1943 as a general reconnaissance unit equipped with 16 Wellington XIIIs, with a role of carrying out maritime reconnaissance and anti-submarine duties over the western Indian Ocean and the coasts of East Africa. In October 1943, the squadron moved to Mogadishu, Somalia, and in November, supplemented its normal duties by being sent to look for 4,000 stolen camels on behalf of the army. In December 1943, the squadron moved to RAF Khormaksar, Aden.

In a more serious series of sorties, the squadron managed to knock out the U-852, but at the beginning of 1945 activities had dropped so low that the squadron was reduced from 16 to 8 aircraft. In November the squadron converted to Warwicks and started in Operation Sunburn, looking for illegal immigrants into Palestine. In April to squadron moved to Palestine and converted to Lancasters. Shortly after it had completed that conversion the squadron was disbanded at RAF Ein Shemer by being re-numbered to No. 18 Squadron RAF on 1 September 1946.

The present 621 Volunteer Gliding Squadron has no links with 621 Squadron, and in fact traces its lines back to No. 87 Glider School RAF.

== Aircraft operated ==
Aircraft operated by No. 621 Squadron RAF
From	To	Aircraft	Notes
September 1943	January 1945	Wellington Mk.XIII	
January 1945	December 1945	Wellington Mk.XIV	
March 1945	November 1945	Warwick GR.5	
April 1946	September 1946	Lancaster ASR.3	

== Squadron bases ==
Bases and airfields used by No. 621 Squadron RAF
From	To	Base	Remarks
12 September 1943	4 November 1943	Port Reitz, Kenya	Det. Mogadishu, Italian Somaliland
4 November 1943	5 December 1943	Mogadishu, Italian Somaliland	Dets at Scusciuban, Italian Somaliland; Bandar Kassim, Italian Somaliland, RAF Riyan, Aden Protectorate
5 December 1943	12 November 1945	RAF Khormaksar, Aden	Dets, Scuscuiban, Italian Somaliland; Bandar Kassim, Italian Somaliland, Riyan, Aden Protectorate; RAF Socotra, Aden Protectorate, Mogadishu, Italian Somaliland
12 November 1945	20 April 1946	RAF Mersa Matruh, Egypt	Dets, RAF Aqir, Palestine and RAF Benina, Libya
20 April 1946	6 June 1946	RAF Aqir, Palestine	
6 June 1946	1 September 1946	RAF Ein Shemer, Palestine	

== Commanding officers ==
Officers commanding No. 621 Squadron RAF
From	To	Name
September 1943	December 1944	W/Cdr. P. Green, OBE, AFC
December 1944	November 1945	W/Cdr. F.T. Gardiner, DFC
November 1945	February 1946	S/Ldr. G. Schofield
February 1946	September 1946	W/Cdr. B.E. Peck, DFC
