= Martin D'Arcy =

English Jesuit priest and author (1888-1976)

The Reverend Martin D'Arcy SJ
- Born: 15 June 1888; Bath, Somerset, England
- Died: 20 November 1976 (aged 88); London, England
- Education: Stonyhurst College; Campion Hall, Oxford
- Occupation: Jesuit priest
- Relatives: Conyers D'Arcy SJ (brother)
- Writing career
- Genre: Philosophy
- Notable works: The Mind and Heart of Love (1945)

Martin Cyril D'Arcy SJ (15 June 1888 – 20 November 1976) was an English Jesuit priest, philosopher of love, and a correspondent, friend, and adviser to a range of literary and artistic figures including Evelyn Waugh, Dorothy L. Sayers, W. H. Auden, Eric Gill and Sir Edwin Lutyens. He has been described as "perhaps England's foremost Catholic public intellectual from the 1930s until his death".

== Background and education ==
Born at Bath, Somerset, the youngest of four sons of Northern Circuit barrister Martin Valentine D'Arcy and Madoline Mary (née Keegan), D'Arcy was educated at Stonyhurst, at Oxford (M.A.), and at the Gregorian University in Rome. He entered the Society of Jesus in 1907 and was ordained priest in 1921. He was Provincial of the English Province of the Society of Jesus from 1945 to 1950.

== Career ==
He spent much of his working life at the English Jesuit house in Oxford, Campion Hall, but also spent periods in residence at American universities, including Georgetown University, Gonzaga University, Cornell, and at the Institute for Advanced Study in Princeton, New Jersey. Among the converts he received into the church was the German-Jewish Baroness Vera von der Heydt.

His major work is The Mind and Heart of Love, published by T. S. Eliot at Faber and Faber in 1945, which explores theological relation of eros love and agape love.

His book The Pain of this World (1935) was on the problem of evil.

== Death ==
D'Arcy died on 20 November 1976 at the Hospital of St John and St Elizabeth, St John's Wood, London. He is buried in St. Mary's Roman Catholic Cemetery, Kensal Green.

== Memorials ==
His grave is 39 NE at St. Mary's Roman Catholic Cemetery, marked with a shared granite grave marker, his details are on the right hand panel.

The permanent collection of Loyola University Museum of Art is named in his memory the Martin D'Arcy Collection.

== Selected publications ==
- The Nature of Belief (1931)
- The Pain of this World and the Providence of God (1935)
- Christian Morals (1937)
- The Mind and Heart of Love (1945)

== Sources ==
- Sire, Henry (1997). Father Martin D'Arcy: Philosopher of Christian Love. Gracewing. ISBN 978-0-85244-439-9.
- William S. Abell (Ed.) Laughter and the Love of Friends: Reminiscences of the Distinguished English Priest and Philosopher Martin Cyril D'Arcy, S.J. (Christian Classics, Inc., 1991)
