= Gwyn Griffin =

English novelist

Gwyn Griffin (1922–1967) was an English novelist.

== Life ==
Gwyn Griffin was born in Egypt, where his father was in the Colonial Service, and was educated in England. During World War II he performed administrative duties in several British colonies in Africa. These included service as a cipher clerk to Major Orde Wingate in Ethiopia and later as adjutant to Prince Makonnen, one of the sons of Emperor Haile Selassie I, in the Sudan Defence Force. In 1946-47 he was an Assistant Superintendent in the Eritrean Police, and later worked as a port pilot in Assab. Imperfect eyesight prevented him from becoming an officer in the British Merchant Navy. In 1950 he married Patricia Dorman-Smith, a daughter of Sir Reginald Dorman-Smith. The couple lived in Australia and the Canary Islands before settling in Introdacqua in the Abruzzo region of Italy. They had no children. Gwyn Griffin died of a bloodstream infection in October 1967, while being treated for a spinal disc problem.

== Work ==
Although most of Griffin's books are set in former British colonies, Master of this Vessel and An Operational Necessity are sea stories and A Last Lamp Burning is set in Naples. Gwyn Griffin's books were well received by the public, and his storytelling ability was particularly noted in reviews of his work. In 1965 he was awarded a Putnam Award for A Last Lamp Burning.

His final novel, An Operational Necessity, was based on the Peleus Incident, the only documented case in World War II in which a U-boat machine-gunned survivors in the water. It was a Book of the Month Club selection and at the time of his death was on The New York Times Best Seller list. It was reissued in 1999 by the Harvill Press.

== Books by Gwyn Griffin ==
- The Occupying Power – 1956
- By the North Gate – 1958
- Something of an Achievement – 1960
- Shipmaster – 1961 (Collins) - also published as Master of This Vessel
- A Significant Experience – 1963
- Freedom Observed – 1963
- Sons of God – 1964
- A Scorpion on a Stone – 1965
- A Last Lamp Burning – 1966
- An Operational Necessity – 1967
