= Archie Granot =

Israeli artist

Archie Granot (Hebrew: ארצ'י גרנות) is a papercutting artist based in Israel. He works in traditional Jewish art, including ketubahs (ketubot), mizrachs, mezuzahs, haggadah and blessings for the Jewish life cycle, etc. Archie was born in London, England in 1946 and moved to Israel in 1967.

Recent works include his Papercut Haggadah on which he worked for nearly a decade. The Haggadah consists of 55 individual works in which all elements, text as well as design, have been cut by scalpel.

== Sources ==
- Gems in Israel: Archie Granot, Master Paper Cutter
- Archie Granot Papercuts - Cutting Edge Ketubas and Jewish Art
