= Thomas Lodwig =

British doctor

Thomas Lodwig was an English doctor, accused of murdering a patient with terminal cancer in 1990. He was acquitted after the prosecution offered no evidence at his trial.

== Case history ==
Lodwig was senior house officer at Battle Hospital, Reading. A 48-year-old patient with terminal pancreatic cancer, Roy Spratley, had been receiving regular and increasing doses of heroin for pain relief. Morphine was also administered. By 29 September 1988, the patient was in continuous uncontrollable pain, and was suffering fits. His family, expecting him to die, asked Lodwig to do something to relieve his pain. Lodwig instructed a nurse to bring him some potassium chloride and lignocaine. When the nurse asked why, he said, "I'm sending someone out there". He then drew a finger across his throat and pointed upwards, an act his counsel later claimed was a joke. A few minutes later the patient died. The nurses on the ward became suspicious and the next day the hospital administration called the police.

Lodwig did not record in his notes the use of the potassium chloride or lignocaine, or the exact time of death.

A postmortem established that the patient also had significant narrowing of the coronary arteries.

== Trial ==
Lodwig's trial was held at the Old Bailey in London on 15 March 1990. The forensic pathologist advising the prosecution determined the cause of death to be acute potassium poisoning. In court, though, the prosecution stated that its main medical witness was no longer convinced that the patient had died solely from a potassium overdose. In addition, Lodwig argued that his intention had been to "kill the pain and not the patient", and that the use of potassium chloride with pain killers to accelerate their analgesic effect had been researched at St Bartholomew's Hospital, London. These trials had supposedly been encouraging but at the time had not been published. Taking both these factors into account, the prosecution decided to offer no evidence.

== See also ==
Other British doctors suspected, implicated or convicted of killing or hastening the deaths of patients include

- John Bodkin Adams
- Leonard Arthur
- Nigel Cox
- Howard Martin
- David Moor
- Harold Shipman
