= Harold Shipman =

English doctor and serial killer (1946–2004)

- Shipman c. 2000
- Born: Harold Frederick Shipman; 14 January 1946; Nottingham, England
- Died: 13 January 2004 (aged 57); HM Prison Wakefield, West Yorkshire, England
- Cause of death: Suicide by hanging
- Education: University of Leeds
- Occupation: General practitioner
- Spouse: Primrose Oxtoby (m. 1966)
- Children: 4
- Penalty: Life imprisonment (whole life tariff)

Details
- Victims: 250 confirmed (15 convicted), possibly more
- Span of crimes: 1975–1998
- Country: England
- Date apprehended: 7 September 1998

Harold Frederick Shipman (14 January 1946 – 13 January 2004) was an English doctor in general practice and serial killer. He is considered to be one of the most prolific serial killers in modern history, with an estimated 250 victims over roughly 30 years. On 31 January 2000, Shipman was convicted of murdering 15 patients under his care. He was sentenced to life imprisonment with a whole life order. On 13 January 2004, one day before his 58th birthday, Shipman hanged himself in his cell at HM Prison Wakefield, West Yorkshire.

The Shipman Inquiry, a two-year-long investigation of all deaths certified by Shipman, chaired by Dame Janet Smith, examined Shipman's crimes. It revealed Shipman targeted vulnerable elderly people who trusted him as their doctor, killing them either with a fatal dose of drugs or by prescribing an abnormal amount.

As of 2026, Shipman, who has been nicknamed "Dr. Death" and the "Angel of Death", is the only British doctor to have been convicted of murdering patients, although other doctors have been acquitted of similar crimes or convicted of lesser charges. Shipman's case has often been compared to that of doctor John Bodkin Adams. Some nurses, such as Beverley Allitt and Lucy Letby, have also been convicted of murdering patients in their care.

== Early and personal life ==
Harold Frederick Shipman was born on 14 January 1946 on the Bestwood Estate, a council estate in Nottingham, the second of three children. His father, also Harold Frederick Shipman (1914–1985), was a lorry driver. His mother was Vera (née Brittan; 1919–1963). His working-class parents were devout Methodists.

Shipman was particularly close to his mother, who died of lung cancer when he was aged 17. Her death came in a manner similar to what later became Shipman's own modus operandi: in the later stages of her disease, she had morphine administered at home by a doctor. Shipman witnessed his mother's pain subside, despite her terminal condition, until her death on 21 June 1963.

On 5 November 1966, Shipman married Primrose May Oxtoby. The couple had four children. Shipman studied medicine at Leeds School of Medicine, University of Leeds, graduating in 1970. He was known to acquaintances as Fred Shipman.

== Career ==
Shipman began working at Pontefract General Infirmary in Pontefract, West Riding of Yorkshire, and in 1974 took his first position as a general practitioner (GP) at the Abraham Ormerod Medical Centre in Todmorden. The following year, Shipman was caught forging prescriptions of pethidine for his own use. He was fined £600 (equivalent to £4,660 in 2025) and briefly attended a drug rehabilitation clinic in York. He worked as a GP at Donneybrook Medical Centre in Hyde, Greater Manchester, in 1977.

Shipman continued working as a GP in Hyde throughout the 1980s and established his own surgery at 21 Market Street in 1993, becoming a respected member of the community. In 1983, he was interviewed in an edition of the Granada Television current affairs documentary World in Action on how the mentally ill should be treated in the community. The interview was re-broadcast on Tonight with Trevor McDonald in 2001, the year after Shipman's conviction.

== Detection of murder ==
In March 1998, Linda Reynolds, a general practitioner at the Brooke Surgery in Hyde, expressed concerns to John Pollard, the coroner for the South Manchester District, about the high death rate among Shipman's patients. In particular, she was concerned about the large number of cremation forms for elderly women that he had asked to have countersigned. The Greater Manchester Police (GMP) were unable to find sufficient evidence to bring charges and closed the investigation on 17 April. The Shipman Inquiry later blamed the GMP for assigning inexperienced officers to the case. After the investigation was closed, Shipman killed three more people. A few months later, in August, taxi driver John Shaw told the police that he suspected Shipman of murdering 21 patients. Shaw became suspicious as many of the elderly customers he took to the hospital, while seemingly in good health, died in Shipman's care.

Shipman's last victim was Kathleen Grundy, a former mayoress of Hyde who was found dead at her home on 24 June 1998. He was the last person to see her alive. He later signed her death certificate, recording the cause of death as old age. Grundy's daughter, solicitor Angela Woodruff, became concerned when fellow solicitor Brian Burgess informed her that a will had been made, apparently by her mother, with doubts about its authenticity. The will excluded Woodruff and her children, but left £386,000 (equivalent to £749,240 in 2025) to Shipman. At Burgess' urging, Woodruff went to police, who began an investigation. Grundy's body was exhumed and found to contain traces of diamorphine (heroin), often used for pain control in terminal cancer patients. Shipman claimed that Grundy had been an addict and showed them comments he had written to that effect in his computerised medical journal. However, police examination of his computer showed that the entries were written after her death.

Shipman was arrested on 7 September 1998, and was found to own a Brother typewriter of the type used to make the forged will. Prescription for Murder, a 2000 book by journalists Brian Whittle and Jean Ritchie, suggested that Shipman forged the will either because he felt his life was out of control and wanted to be caught, or because he planned to retire at age 55 and leave the United Kingdom. Police investigated other deaths that Shipman had certified and investigated fifteen specimen cases. They discovered a pattern of his administering lethal doses of diamorphine, signing patients' death certificates and then falsifying medical records to indicate that they had been in poor health. In addition, an abnormally large number of the deaths occurred around the same time of day (when Shipman was on his afternoon visits) and in the doctor's presence.

In 2003, three years after Shipman had been convicted, a paper by statistician David Spiegelhalter and others found that Shipman's mortality rates had been broadly in line with national rates between 1988 and 1994, and started increasing in 1995. They suggested that statistical monitoring could have led to an alarm being raised at the end of 1996, although not before, when there had already been 67 excess deaths of Shipman's female patients aged over 65, before reaching 119 in 1998, when suspicions were first actually raised.

== Trial and imprisonment ==
Shipman's trial began at Preston Crown Court on 5 October 1999. He was charged with the murders of fifteen women by lethal injections of diamorphine between 1995 and 1998:

- Marie West, 81
- Irene Turner, 67
- Lizzie Adams, 77
- Jean Lilley, 59
- Ivy Lomas, 63
- Muriel Grimshaw, 76
- Marie Quinn, 67
- Kathleen Wagstaff, 81
- Bianka Pomfret, 49
- Norah Nuttall, 65
- Pamela Hillier, 68
- Maureen Ward, 57
- Winifred Mellor, 73
- Joan Melia, 73
- Kathleen Grundy, 81

Shipman's legal representatives tried unsuccessfully to have the Grundy case tried separately, as a motive was shown by the alleged forgery of Grundy's will.

On 31 January 2000, after six days of deliberation, the jury found Shipman guilty of 15 counts of murder and one count of forgery. Mr Justice Forbes subsequently sentenced Shipman to life imprisonment on all 15 counts of murder, with a recommendation that he be subject to a whole life tariff, to be served concurrently with a sentence of four years for forging Grundy's will. On 11 February, eleven days after his conviction, Shipman was struck off the medical register by the General Medical Council (GMC). Two years later, Home Secretary David Blunkett confirmed the judge's whole life tariff, just months before British government ministers lost their power to set minimum terms for prisoners. While authorities could have brought many additional charges, they concluded that a fair hearing would be impossible given the enormous publicity surrounding the original trial. Furthermore, the 15 life sentences already imposed rendered further litigation unnecessary. Shipman became friends with fellow serial killer Peter Moore while in prison.

Shipman denied his guilt, disputing the scientific evidence against him. He never made any public statements about his actions. Shipman's wife, Primrose, maintained that he was not guilty.

Shipman is the only doctor in the history of British medicine found guilty of murdering his patients. John Bodkin Adams was charged in 1957 with murdering a patient, amid rumours he had killed dozens more over a 10-year period and "possibly provided the role model for Shipman". He was acquitted and no further charges were pursued. The historian Pamela Cullen argued that because of Adams's acquittal, there was no impetus to examine potential flaws in the British legal system until the Shipman case.

== Death ==
Shipman hanged himself in his cell at HM Prison Wakefield on 13 January 2004, the day before his 58th birthday. The Medico Legal Centre in Sheffield performed a post-mortem examination, and an inquest was opened.

Some of the victims' families said they felt "cheated", as Shipman's suicide meant they would never have the satisfaction of a confession, nor answers as to why he committed his crimes. Home Secretary David Blunkett admitted that celebration was tempting: "You wake up and you receive a phone call – Shipman's topped himself. You have just got to think for a minute: is it too early to open a bottle? And then you discover that everybody's very upset that he's done it."

Shipman's death divided national newspapers, with the Daily Mirror branding him a "cold coward" and condemning the Prison Service for allowing his suicide to occur. However, The Sun ran the celebratory front-page headline "Ship Ship hooray!" The Independent called for the inquiry into Shipman's suicide to look more widely at the state of UK prisons as well as the welfare of inmates. In The Guardian, an article by General Sir David Ramsbotham, who had formerly served as Her Majesty's Chief Inspector of Prisons, suggested that whole-life sentencing be replaced by indefinite sentencing, reducing the risk of prisoners ending their own lives by suicide, as well as making their management easier for prison officials.

Shipman's motive for suicide was never established, though he reportedly told his probation officer that he was considering suicide to assure his wife's financial security after he was stripped of his National Health Service pension. Primrose Shipman received a full NHS pension that she would not have been entitled to if Shipman had lived past the age of 60. Additionally, there was evidence that Primrose, who had consistently attested to Shipman's innocence despite the overwhelming evidence, had begun to suspect his guilt. Shipman refused to take part in courses which would have encouraged acknowledgement of his crimes, leading to a temporary removal of privileges, including the right to telephone his wife. During this period, according to Shipman's cellmate, he received a letter from Primrose exhorting him to "Tell me everything, no matter what." A 2005 inquiry found that Shipman's suicide "could not have been predicted or prevented", but that procedures should nonetheless be re-examined.

After Shipman's body was released to his family, it remained in Sheffield for more than a year. His widow was advised by police against burying him in case the grave was attacked. The body was eventually cremated on 19 March 2005 at Hutcliffe Wood Crematorium in Sheffield, attended only by Shipman's widow and the couple's four children.

== Aftermath ==
In January 2001, Chris Gregg, a senior West Yorkshire Police detective, was selected to lead an investigation into 22 of the West Yorkshire deaths. Following this, The Shipman Inquiry, submitted in July 2002, concluded that he had killed at least 218 of his patients between 1975 and 1998, during which time he practised in Todmorden (1974–1975) and Hyde (1977–1998). Janet Smith, the judge who submitted the report, said that there were further deaths about which there was so little evidence that a conclusion on whether they were unlawful killings could not be reached. Most of his victims were elderly women in good health.

In her sixth and final report, issued on 24 January 2005, Smith reported that she believed that Shipman had killed three patients during the early stage of his medical career at Pontefract General Infirmary and that she had serious suspicions about four further deaths, including that of a four-year-old girl. In total, 459 people died while under his care between 1971 and 1998, but it is uncertain how many of those were murder victims, as he was often the only doctor to certify a death. Smith's estimate of Shipman's total victim count over that 27-year period was 250.

The GMC charged six doctors who signed cremation forms for Shipman's victims with misconduct on the grounds that they should have noticed the pattern between Shipman's home visits and his patients' deaths. They were all found not guilty. In October 2005 the GMC found two doctors who worked at Tameside General Hospital in 1994 guilty of serious professional misconduct for failing to report their concerns and for giving misleading evidence to the Shipman inquiry. The Shipman Inquiry recommended changes to the structure of the GMC.

In 2005, it came to light that Shipman may have stolen jewellery from his victims. In 1998, police had seized over £10,000 worth of jewellery they found in his garage. In March 2005, when Primrose asked for its return, police wrote to the families of Shipman's victims asking them to identify the jewellery. Unidentified items were handed to the Assets Recovery Agency in May. The investigation ended in August. Authorities returned 66 pieces to Primrose and auctioned 33 pieces that she confirmed were not hers. Proceeds of the auction went to Tameside Victim Support. The only piece returned to a murdered patient's family was a platinum diamond ring, for which the family provided a photograph as proof of ownership.

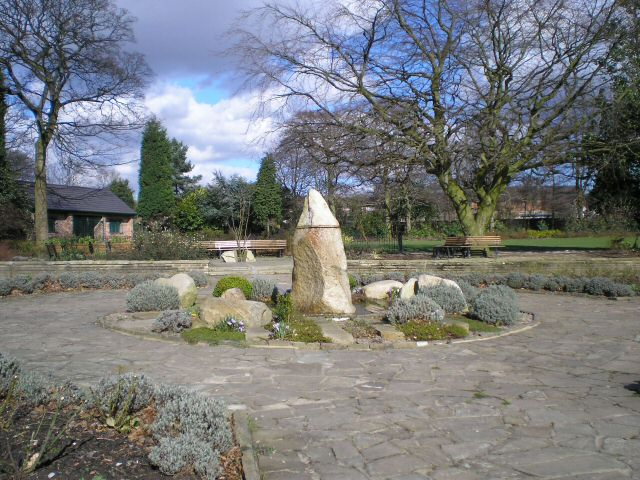
Garden of Tranquillity in 2007

A memorial garden to Shipman's victims, called the Garden of Tranquillity, opened in Hyde Park, Hyde, on 30 July 2005. As of early 2009, families of over 200 of the victims of Shipman were still seeking compensation for the deaths of their relatives. In September 2009, letters Shipman wrote in prison to friends were to be sold at auction, but following complaints from victims' relatives and the media, the sale was withdrawn.

=== Shipman effect ===
The Shipman case, and a series of recommendations in the Shipman Inquiry report, led to changes to standard medical procedures in the UK (now referred to as the "Shipman effect"). Many doctors reported changes in their dispensing practices, and a reluctance to risk overprescribing pain medication may have led to under-prescribing. Death certification practices were altered as well.

The forms needed for a cremation in England and Wales have had their questions altered as a direct result of the Shipman case. For example, the person(s) organising the funeral must answer, "Do you know or suspect that the death of the person who has died was violent or unnatural? Do you consider that there should be any further examination of the remains of the person who has died?"

As of 1 December 2023, Shipman, also nicknamed "Dr Death" and "The Angel of Death", is the only British doctor to have been convicted of murdering patients, although other doctors, such as Isyaka Mamman, have been acquitted of similar crimes or convicted of lesser charges and nurses such as Lucy Letby, Beverley Allitt, Colin Norris, Benjamin Geen and Victorino Chua have also been convicted of murdering patients in their care.

== In media ==
Harold and Fred (They Make Ladies Dead) was a cartoon strip in a 2001 issue of Viz comic, also featuring serial killer Fred West. Some relatives of Shipman's victims voiced anger at the cartoon.

A Mini-CD album by V/Vm, Dr. Fred Plays... His Favorite Medical Drama Theme Tunes, released in 2001, referenced and parodied Shipman, featuring an unlicensed photo of him on the cover. It received "adverse publicity" in the Daily Sport and the Daily Record.

Harold Shipman: Doctor Death, an ITV television dramatisation of the case, was broadcast in 2002. It starred James Bolam in the title role.

A documentary Harold Shipman: Doctor Death, with new witness testimony, was shown by ITV as part of its Crime & Punishment strand on 26 April 2018. The programme was criticised as offering "little new insight".

"D.A.W.", the twentieth episode of Season 3 of the American TV series Law & Order: Criminal Intent, is inspired by the Harold Shipman murders.

Season 4, Episode 12 of World's Most Evil Killers covered Harold Shipman, briefly describing his life, his murder of Kathleen Grundy, the work connecting the murder of Grundy to several others that resulted in his January 2000 conviction on 15 counts of murder (and one count of forgery), and the subsequent Shipman Inquiry. It ends with a list of the 218 people identified as his victims during the Inquiry.

A play titled Beyond Belief – Scenes from the Shipman Inquiry, written by Dennis Woolf and directed by Chris Honer, was performed at the Library Theatre, Manchester, from 20 October to 22 November 2004. The script of the play comprised edited verbatim extracts from the Shipman Inquiry, spoken by actors playing the witnesses and lawyers at the inquiry. This provided a "stark narrative" that focused on personal tragedies.

A BBC drama-documentary, Harold Shipman, starring Ian Brooker in the title role was broadcast in April 2014.

The satirical artist Cold War Steve regularly features Shipman in his work.

The Shipman Files: A Very British Crime Story, a three-part documentary by Chris Wilson, was broadcast on BBC Two on three consecutive nights between 28 and 30 September 2020, and focussed on Shipman's victims and how he went undetected for so long.

Podcast episode "Catching a Killer Doctor" from the Cautionary Tales with Tim Harford podcast series features the story of Harold Shipman and how detection could have been made much earlier with good statistical models.

Shipman was mentioned in the 2022 Wakefield by-election when Conservative candidate Nadeem Ahmed highlighted his local connections, following Shipman's suicide in Wakefield prison, claiming that voters should "trust Tories like they do GPs after Harold Shipman".

In 2023, DeadHappy, a Leicester-based life insurance firm, was criticised for using an image of Shipman in one of its advertisements. The Advertising Standards Authority received more than 70 complaints about the advert.

In 2025, Shipman was referenced in the third episode of series 3 of The Traitors, a reality television game show where "faithful" contestants are tasked with finding and banishing the titular "Traitors". During the roundtable discussion, medical doctor Kasim Ahmed was accused of being a Traitor by fellow contestant Jake Brown, who claimed that it would "make sense" for Ahmed to "save lives during the day" while "murdering by night" within the narrative of the show. Ahmed then stated that he believed Brown was "basically calling [him] Harold Shipman". This moment caused Shipman to trend on social media.

== See also ==
- List of serial killers in the United Kingdom
- List of serial killers by number of victims
- Euthanasia
- Other medical professionals who killed patients, or attempted to:
  - 2011 Stepping Hill Hospital poisoning incident (one nurse convicted of murder)
  - Beverley Allitt (1991, multiple attempted murders and GBH)
  - Nigel Cox (doctor) (1991, attempted murder)
  - Charles Cullen (1988–2003, multiple murders)
  - Benjamin Geen (2003–04, murder and GBH)
  - Niels Högel (2000–2005, multiple murders)
  - Jack Kevorkian (1998, murder)
  - Lucy Letby (2015–16, convicted for multiple deaths suspected of being murder)
  - Colin Norris (2002, multiple murders)
  - Aino Nykopp-Koski (2004–2009, multiple murders)
  - John Bodkin Adams (1946–56, multiple suspected murders)
  - Michael Swango (1981–1997, multiple murders)
  - Elizabeth Wettlaufer (2007–2016, multiple murders)
- Convicted of offences other than homicide:
  - Christopher Duntsch (2012, injury to an elderly person)
  - Jayant Patel (2003, dishonestly gaining registration (acquitted of manslaughter))
- Suspects acquitted:
  - Leonard Arthur (1980, attempted murder of an infant with Down syndrome)
  - Thomas Lodwig (1990, murder)
  - Howard Martin (2005, murder)
  - Jessie McTavish (1974, murder)
  - David Moor (1997, murder)
