= Healthcare in Oxfordshire =

Healthcare in Oxfordshire, England, is managed by the Buckinghamshire, Oxfordshire and Berkshire West integrated care system.

== History ==
From 1947 to 1965, NHS services in Oxfordshire were managed by Oxford Regional Hospital Board. In 1974 the boards were abolished and replaced by regional health authorities: the county came under the Oxford RHA. Regions were reorganised in 1994 and Oxfordshire came under the Anglia and Oxford Regional Health Authority. Oxfordshire had two area health authorities from 1974 – West Berkshire and Oxfordshire. In 1982 it had only one district health authority. Regional health authorities were reorganised and renamed strategic health authorities in 2002, with Oxfordshire covered by Thames Valley SHA. In 2006 regions were again reorganised and Oxfordshire came under NHS South Central until that was abolished in 2013. There was only one primary care trust for the area.

Until 2022, healthcare was the responsibility of Oxfordshire Clinical Commissioning Group. Louise Patten was appointed the permanent chief executive of both Oxfordshire and Buckinghamshire CCGs in January 2019, leading to suggestions that this might be followed by a merger. Buckinghamshire, Oxfordshire and Berkshire West integrated care board (known as BOB ICB) was established in July 2022.

The county was part of the Buckinghamshire, Oxfordshire and Berkshire West sustainability and transformation plan area. In 2018, there were plans to replace the nine community hospitals in the county with four community hubs and to close 110 acute beds at Horton General Hospital. The Care Quality Commission reported in February 2018 that there were multiple problems with the inpatient discharge process. Over 71% of discharges were unplanned and some took place between 2 a.m. and 3 a.m. Social care providers reported that they did not receive discharge summaries for over 50% of the patients referred to them. There was "little collaboration between system partners".

The integrated care board's plans to work with the public and patients were attacked as "deeply disappointing" and "box ticking" by the Oxfordshire joint health overview and scrutiny committee in June 2022.

== Primary care ==
There are 70 GP practices in the county.

== Acute services ==
Acute services are provided by Oxford University Hospitals NHS Foundation Trust. There are two hospitals with accident and emergency facilities: the John Radcliffe Hospital in Oxford and the Horton General Hospital in Banbury. The former is a major trauma centre.

== Mental Health ==
Mental health services are provided by Oxford Health NHS Foundation Trust.

== See also ==
- Healthcare in the United Kingdom
