= Benjamin Geen =

British murderer

- Born: 1980 (age 45–46); England, United Kingdom
- Other name: 'Ben Allitt' (reference to Beverley Allitt)
- Occupation: Nurse
- Parent(s): Erica and Mick Geen
- Convictions: 2 counts of murder, 15 counts of grievous bodily harm
- Penalty: Life imprisonment with a minimum tariff of 30 years

Details
- Victims: 2–12 murder victims, (Note: He was convicted of two murders, but a patient later died after being attacked by Geen, and 9 other cases were originally investigated) 15–24 victims of grievous bodily harm (Note: He was convicted of 15 counts of GBH, but 9 other cases were originally investigated)
- Span of crimes: December 2003 – February 2004
- Country: United Kingdom
- Date apprehended: 9 February 2004

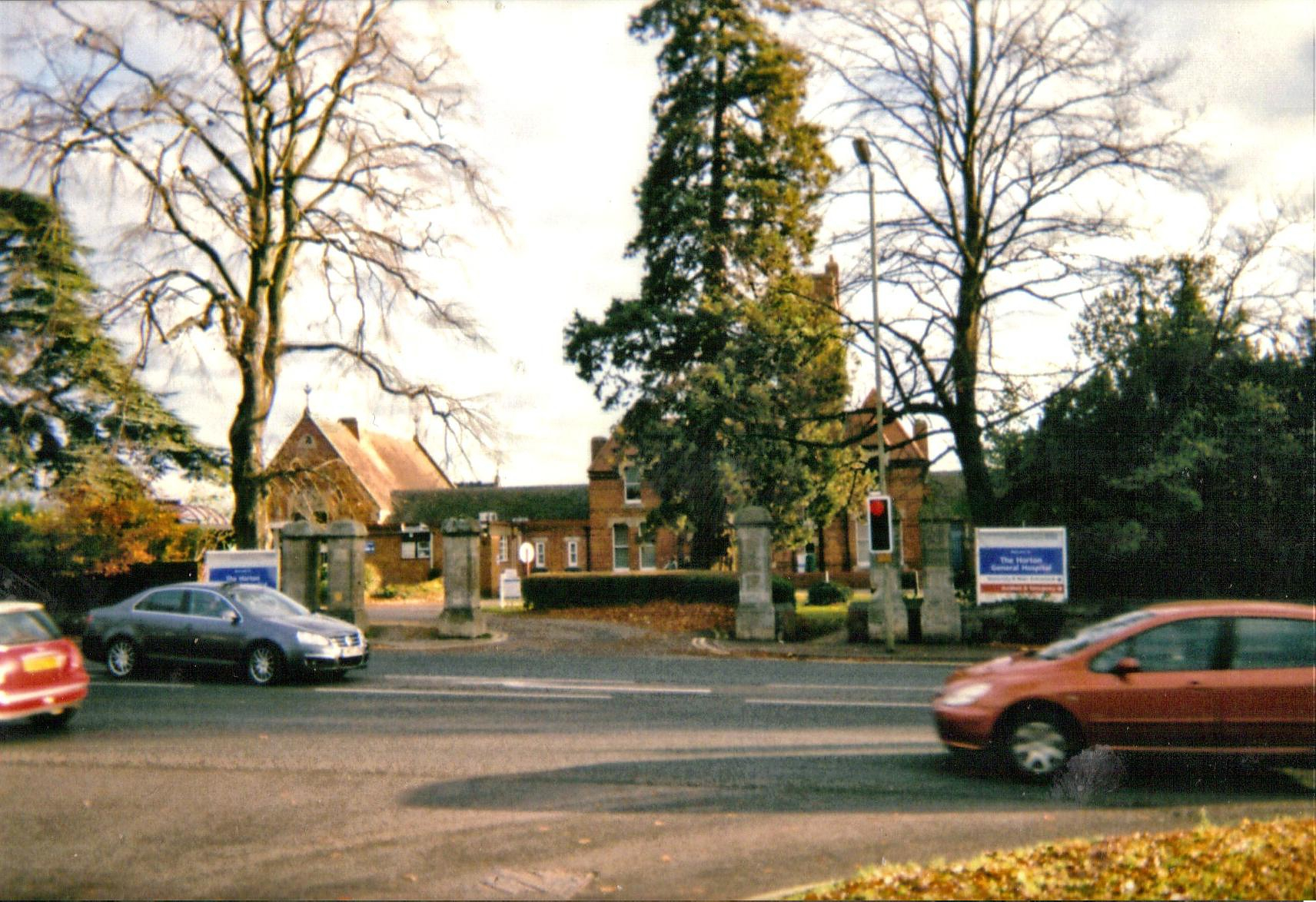
The Horton General Hospital in Banbury in 2010

Benjamin Geen is a British repeat murderer and former nurse who was convicted of killing two of his own patients and committing grievous bodily harm against 15 others while working at Horton General Hospital in Banbury, Oxfordshire in 2003 and 2004.

Geen, who was believed to be motivated by his 'thrill-seeking' temperament, injected a number of patients with dangerous drugs in order to cause respiratory arrest so he could enjoy the 'thrill' of resuscitating them. He was apprehended after staff at the hospital noticed that it was always when he treated patients, most of whom only had minor injuries such as dislocated shoulders, that they inexplicably had respiratory failures. Upon his arrest, a syringe full of some of the drugs he used to attack patients was found on his person. When he saw officers approaching, he discharged the syringe contents into his jacket pocket in an attempt to hide the fact he had removed potentially lethal drugs from the hospital without authority. He was found guilty at trial in 2006 and sentenced to a minimum of 30 years imprisonment. All but one of the guilty verdicts against him were by unanimous jury decision.

Geen has maintained his innocence but his multiple appeals have failed. In 2009 the Court of Appeal observed that the evidence against him was overwhelming and rejected claims that statistics could show his conviction to be unsafe, agreeing that "the danger of approaching this particular case on the basis of academic statistical opinion, however distinguished, is [that it is] divorced from the actual facts". Three applications for appeal to the Criminal Case Review Commission, the independent body which investigates alleged miscarriages of justice, have also been rejected, most recently in 2020.

== Background ==
Geen was known at Horton General Hospital as a nurse who always looked for action. Colleagues noted that whenever patients unexpectedly fell ill Geen was around, leading to their nicknaming him 'Ben Allitt'. This was a reference to the infamous serial killer nurse Beverley Allitt, who in 1991 had injected a number of patients with lethal substances to seek attention. Geen was himself described as someone who wanted to be the centre of attention. He had joined the army reserve and was said to want to "walk towards the action and not away from it". Despite the fact that his post was in the minor injuries unit at the hospital, he would often leave his post without authority to work in the emergency department. He was a self-acknowledged "thrill-seeker", and enjoyed the adrenaline rush of working in the casualty department on life or death cases. He said that there was a 'jinx' on him and that things tended to go wrong when he was around.

In the month in which his crimes began, Geen appeared in an edition of the Banbury Citizen. Notably, this edition also featured an interview with actress Rachel Leskovac, who played a serial killer nurse in the medical drama Holby City. This fictional character had murdered patients by secretly administering insulin and was eventually exposed as a murderer. Nurses at Horton Hospital later observed that there were notable similarities between this storyline and the crimes of Geen.

=== Previous warnings about behaviour ===
Geen was described as "gung-ho" for ignoring instructions. He had previously been warned by hospital managers for turning up at the emergency department without authority, and was instructed to stop drifting there from the minor injuries unit where he was posted. He had also been reprimanded for wearing nurse's epaulettes while he was unqualified to do so.

== Crimes ==
Between December 2003 and February 2004, 18 patients treated in the hospital's accident and emergency department suffered respiratory arrests or depressions while Geen, a trainee nurse, was alone with each patient. These patients had all been admitted with only minor complaints such as dislocated shoulders and other mostly non-life-threatening conditions, yet suddenly found themselves fighting for their lives when they were treated by Geen. The respiratory arrests were unexplained since none of the patients' conditions should have caused a respiratory arrest to occur. Two of those patients had died in January 2004: Anthony Bateman (age 65) and David Onley (age 75).

Onley had been admitted to the hospital due to heart problems and complications with his diabetes. As part of standard procedure an insulin drip was given to Onley, and his condition improved. However, Geen then took over as day nurse and 35 minutes later the man suffered an unexplained respiratory arrest and struggled to breathe, causing him to die. Another man who suffered an unexplained respiratory arrest when treated by Geen, David Nelson, was found to have the drug midazolam in his system, despite its not having been prescribed by any of the medical staff. When given incorrectly this drug can cause respiratory arrest. Another of Geen's patients who had been admitted due to stomach pains was found to have midazolam and the paralytic vecuronium in his system, with no one having prescribed him these drugs. Notably, the latter patient was fine both before and after Geen treated him, having been well enough to drive himself to the hospital and making a full recovery after his respiratory arrest as soon as doctors put him on a life support machine.

A fit 22-year-old had also fallen into respiratory arrest for no apparent reason when treated by Geen, as well as a woman who only attended the hospital due to a stomach complaint. Another patient who had been admitted after drinking a bottle of gin and painkillers stopped breathing after Geen gave him an anaesthetic he did not need. Another significant case was that of a 67-year-old woman who had been admitted to the minor injuries unit with only a dislocated shoulder. As soon as nurse Geen attended the patient and said he would flush out her morphine drip, she fell unconscious and into a respiratory arrest. Crucially, the woman was a former nurse herself, and was able to credibly describe in full what had happened and how Geen had been attending to her when she inexplicably fell ill. There was no reason for the woman to fall into respiratory arrest from having a dislocated shoulder. Geen was the first person on the scene and immediately knew what the issue was.

Colleagues began to notice that it was always when Geen was on duty and attending patients that people were falling unexpectedly ill, and also noted that he always automatically knew why they were ill and what to do to remedy the situation. There had been concerns about his behaviour, particularly as he knew what to do to rectify problems even before a doctor had arrived to make a diagnosis. This indicated he knew what the problem was as he had caused it in the first place. Colleagues had nicknamed him "Ben Allitt" in reference to serial killer nurse Beverley Allitt; research shows that medical workers who are given such nicknames by others are often later found to have harmed patients. Several testified that Geen looked "elated" as his patients went into respiratory arrest and even "boasted" to a doctor: "There is always a resuscitation when I'm on duty."

== Investigation ==
An internal investigation (before the two deaths had occurred) initially identified 25 patients who had experienced sudden respiratory arrest or failure under Geen's care, but nine were discounted before administrators alerted the police. The Thames Valley Police conducted an investigation involving up to 40 officers and independent medical experts who advised the force. Tests discovered that a number of the patients who had suffered respiratory arrests had been inexplicably given the drug midazolam. It was discovered that Geen had injected patients with such unauthorised, lethal doses of drugs and this is what caused them to stop breathing. Medical experts agreed with the conclusions the police had drawn, and agreed that these drugs would cause the same symptoms of respiratory arrest that patients had suffered when treated by Geen.

== Arrest and syringe discovery ==
Geen was arrested as he arrived at the hospital to work on 9 February 2004. He had on his person a syringe with the potentially lethal paralytic vecuronium inside, despite it being strictly forbidden for nurses to take syringes or such drugs out of the hospital. The same paralyzing agent had been given to David Onley and to other patients who had gone into respiratory arrest while treated by Geen. As he saw the officers approaching, Geen discharged the contents of the syringe into the pocket of his jacket in an attempt to hide the fact he was taking this drug and syringe into the hospital that morning. He refused to tell the officers what the drug was when they apprehended him, further raising suspicion.

Geen claimed that he had accidentally taken the syringe home in a pocket of his scrubs after a chaotic day. The syringe needle was found to be heavily worn showing it had been used a number of times. In hospitals syringes (and needles) are single use. The jacket was tested and was found to not only contain vecuronium but also traces of midazolam, the drug known to have been illegally administered to some of Geen's patients and which had caused them to go into respiratory arrest.

Geen was formally accused of two murders and of inflicting grievous bodily harm with intent upon 16 patients.

== Trial ==
"It is clear that he wanted to be the centre of attention and in order to fuel this desire, brought some of his patients to the brink of death and coldly murdered two of them."

— Detective Superintendent Andy Taylor, who led the murder investigation, after Geen's trial in 2006.

During his trial, Oxford Crown Court was told that Geen purposely used insulin, sedatives, and muscle relaxants to trigger respiratory arrest or failure in patients because he enjoyed the 'thrill' of resuscitating them. Both the prosecution and defence accepted that he was often around when things unexpectedly went wrong in the hospital. One nurse testified how Geen appeared "elated" when one of the victims went into respiratory arrest, and said "oh no, here we go again" as the patient began to fight for breath despite being in a good condition minutes earlier. Another testified how she had been treating the patient earlier in the morning when he was in a good condition, but then discovered he had died shortly after she had handed over responsibility of his care to Geen.

On 18 April 2006, a jury found Geen guilty of the two murder charges and of intentionally inflicting grievous bodily harm on 15 patients. On 9 May 2006 Geen, then 25 years old, was given 17 life sentences with the recommendation that he spend at least 30 years in prison before being considered for parole. In court, Geen maintained his innocence and vowed to appeal his conviction. All but one of the guilty verdicts were unanimous.

Criminologist and detective Graham Hill concluded that Geen had hero syndrome. This is when individuals want to be seen as a hero, sometimes causing them to create devastating situations so that they can then be seen to 'save the day'.

== Subsequent events ==
=== Fate of victims ===
A patient who fell into a coma for six days after being treated by Geen, John Thorburn, later died in 2009. His son Richard would state to The Times in December 2014 that his father had never fully recovered from Geen's attack and this led to his subsequent death.

=== Failed appeals ===
Geen's case was reviewed by lawyers and volunteers from the London Innocence Project. Geen's barrister, Michael Powers, has stated that "there was a major miscarriage of justice." Mark McDonald, founder and chair of the London Innocence Project, has said that he believes the case against Geen was manufactured. Geen's family believes he is the victim of a "witch-hunt" by officials seeking to avoid the mistakes made in the case of Dr. Harold Shipman.

A first appeal failed in November 2009, when the Court of Appeal rejected his defence. The court observed that the evidence against him was overwhelming and concluded that any attempt to use statistical evidence to demonstrate Geen's innocence was flawed, declaring:

"There was in any event a wealth of material pointing to the applicant's guilt from which the jury would have drawn their own safe and proper inferences. Mr Price [prosecution KC] argued the danger of approaching this particular case on the basis of academic statistical opinion, however distinguished, is divorced from the actual facts. We agree. That the jury gave consideration to the individual cases rather than any pattern alone is evidenced by the acquittal of the count in relation to Mr Zinram, the fact that there was a majority verdict on another count, and the fact that they were in retirement for just under 28 hours."

Richard Thorburn, son of Geen victim John Thorburn, publicly insisted in 2014 that Geen had been rightfully convicted.

Geen's subsequent applications for appeal to the Criminal Cases Review Commission, the public body that investigates alleged miscarriages of justice, have all been rejected. For his first application his defence team again recruited mathematical experts who stated that a statistical cluster of respiratory arrests was not unusual, but the miscarriage of justice watchdog was likewise unconvinced and rejected his application. Applications to the CCRC were rejected in both 2013 and 2015. The CCRC noted that, besides the statistics, there was other compelling evidence indicating Geen's guilt, such as the syringe full of drugs found in his pocket which he had tried to hide and the fact that all of the patients had rapidly declined while under his personal care. Statistics only made up a minor part of the evidence against Geen, his conviction being mainly based on the direct evidence against him that the CCRC had taken note of when turning down the application, such as the murder weapon found in his pocket full of the drugs used in the attacks. The commission was then forced to reconsider its 2015 decision in the wake of a legal challenge, but in July 2020 the CCRC again announced that they saw no reason to refer Geen's case to the Court of Appeal and rejected his application. In total his appeals have been denied on four occasions.

In a 2017 episode of the CBS Reality programme The Jury Room, in which 12 members of the public were asked to act as a 'jury' and review the evidence against Geen, the 'jury' unanimously concluded that Geen was guilty and not a victim of a miscarriage of justice. High-profile detective Colin Sutton, best known for leading the Metropolitan Police investigations into Levi Bellfield and Delroy Grant, has also publicly stated that Geen is likely guilty, highlighting that his defence team's argument that statistical clusters of respiratory arrests are not uncommon does not explain why all the arrests happened while nurse Geen was on duty tending to the patients. He has also pointed to the fact that there was a large amount of other evidence against him which the statistics could not account for.

=== New evidence ===
In 2023 lawyers acting for Geen said there was new evidence that undermined the safety of his convictions. An analysis of data, relating to patients in the United States, who had similar characteristics, indicated that the patients went into respiratory arrest on his ward was "nothing out of the ordinary". Michael Freeman, a consultant and professor in forensic medicine and epidemiology said "There is incontrovertible and highly reliable epidemiological evidence that multiple patients with respiratory arrest would have been expected amongst Mr Geen's charges during the 42-day period at issue". Mark McDonald, a barrister representing Geen, said he would present the new statistical evidence to the CCRC and expected that they would refer the case to the Court of Appeal.

== In popular culture ==
Geen's case has been the subject of multiple television programmes:

- A series 1 episode of the series Nurses Who Kill aired in 2016 which focused on Geen's crimes.
- An episode of the CBS Reality programme The Jury Room focused on Geen's case in 2017. Twelve members of the public were asked to act as a 'jury' and review the evidence against Geen. The 'jury' unanimously concluded that Geen was guilty.
- A series 4 episode of Crime+ Investigation's Killer Britain with Dermot Murnaghan documented Geen's crimes. It aired on 4 April 2022.

== See also ==
- John Bodkin Adams – British doctor who was controversially acquitted of the murder of a patient in 1957, but who is now suspected to have murdered 163 of his patients over 10 years
- 2011 Stepping Hill Hospital poisoning incident – in which a nurse poisoned several patients with insulin in a hospital in Manchester
- David Moor – British doctor who was acquitted in 1999 of a murder but who subsequently admitted to 'helping' 300 patients to die
- Colin Norris – Scottish nurse convicted in 2002 for the murder of four elderly patients and attempted murder of another in two hospitals in Leeds
- Niels Högel – German nurse sentenced to life imprisonment, initially for the murders of six patients, and later convicted of a total of 85 murders
- Lucy Letby – British nurse convicted of murdering seven babies
