= Arnfinn Nesset =

Norwegian nurse and serial killer (1936–2025)

- Born: 25 October 1936; Trøndelag, Norway
- Died: 2 December 2025 (aged 89)
- Convictions: Murder (22 counts); Attempted murder
- Penalty: 21 years imprisonment

Details
- Victims: 22–138
- Span of crimes: 1981–1983
- Country: Norway

Arnfinn Nesset (25 October 1936 – 2 December 2025) was a Norwegian nurse and nursing home manager who was a convicted serial killer. His crimes include the murders of at least 22 people, as well as attempted murder, document forgery, and embezzlement. He may have murdered up to 138 people. In 1983, he was convicted of poisoning 22 patients and sentenced to 21 years in prison. He served 12 years and 10 years of supervision and was thought to be living under an assumed name.

== Early life ==
Nesset was born in Trøndelag in 1936 out of wedlock and raised by his mother, living with her throughout his upbringing and adulthood at her childhood home. His father was absent from his life and never established contact with him. He was educated as a registered nurse before being hired in 1977 as a head nurse at a larger nursing home in Orkdal Municipality, Sør-Trøndelag.

== Crimes ==
During the summer and autumn of 1981, a series of suspicious deaths were uncovered at the Orkdal nursing home that Nesset managed. When questioned by police, Nesset initially confessed to the murders of 27 patients, whom he claimed to have killed by injecting them with suxamethonium chloride, a drug to paralyze muscles. He was charged with 25 counts of homicide but later retracted his confession and denied all charges for the rest of his five-month trial.

== Trial ==
Nesset was convicted in March 1983 of poisoning 22 patients with suxamethonium chloride. He was also convicted of one count of attempted murder and acquitted on two other counts. Nesset may have killed as many as 138 of his patients.

He was sentenced to 21 years in prison, the maximum term then available under Norwegian law, to be followed by ten years of preventative detention. However, he was released after 12 years for good behaviour and 10 years of supervision. He was subsequently reported to be living in an undisclosed location under an assumed name.

The chief prosecutor at his trial, Olaf Jakhelln described Nesset as "an ambitious man, who wanted complete control over life and death [of his victims]."

== Death ==
Nesset died at a nursing home on 2 December 2025, at the age of 89.

== See also ==
- Anders Hansson, a nursing aide who committed similar murders at a nursing home in Malmö, Sweden, during roughly the same time.
- John Bodkin Adams
- Harold Shipman
- Stephan Letter
- List of serial killers by country
- List of serial killers by number of victims
