= St Paul's Church, Sheffield =

Church in Sheffield, South Yorkshire, England

St Paul's Church
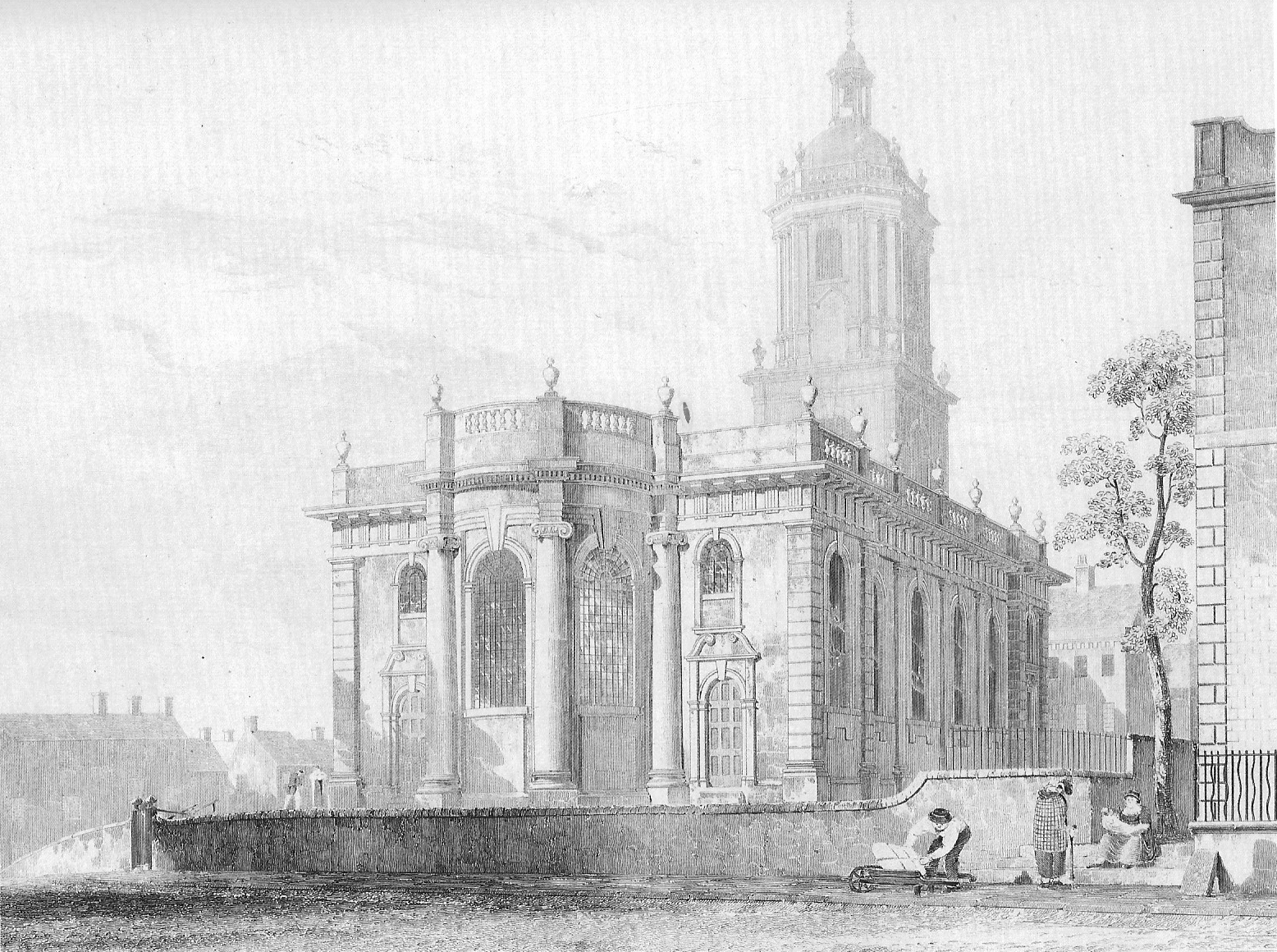
- St Paul's in 1809, as seen by Edward Blore.

- Location within Sheffield

Religion
- Affiliation: Anglican
- District: Diocese of York (Diocese of Sheffield from 1914)
- Ecclesiastical or organisational status: Former church
- Year consecrated: 1740

Location
- Location: Sheffield; South Yorkshire, England
- Coordinates: 53.3797°N 1.4700°W

Architecture
- Type: Church
- Completed: 1721
- Capacity: 1,200

See also St Paul's Church and Centre, Norton Lees, Sheffield and Sheffield Cathedral, which is dedicated to St Peter and St Paul.

St Paul's Church, Sheffield, was a chapel of ease to Sheffield Parish Church.

By 1700, Sheffield's population had reached 5,000, and a second Anglican place of worship was required to house a growing congregation. A site on the southern edge of the town was selected, facing on to Pinstone Lane (later redeveloped as Pinstone Street). A public subscription was raised, and St Paul's was largely completed by 1721. The church was built in the Baroque style, with the street frontage dominated by an Italianate tower. The chapel had seating for 1,200 people.

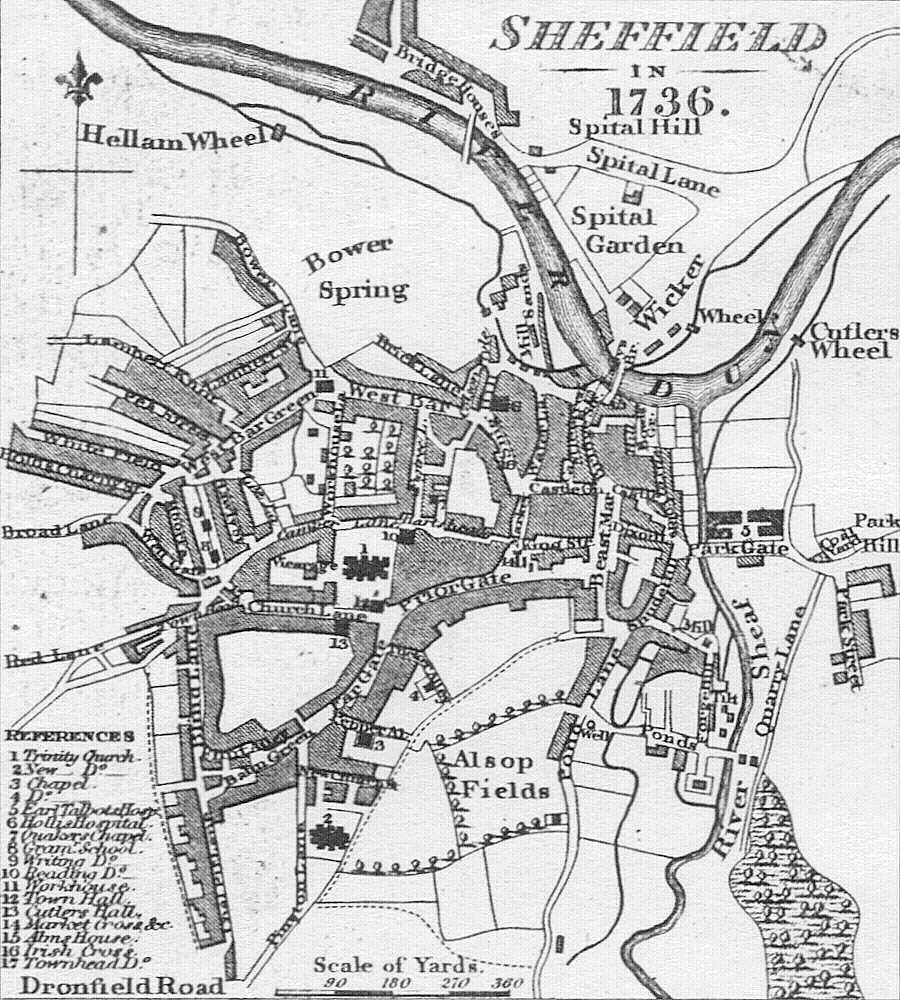
Map of Sheffield in 1736. St Paul's is numbered "2", towards the south west of the map.

A dispute over patronage prevented the chapel from opening until 1740. Robert Downes, a local goldsmith, had paid £1,000 towards its construction and promised a further £30 a year, on condition that he and his descendants would have the right to appoint its minister. However, the Vicar of Sheffield objected that, as St Paul's was a chapel of ease to his own church, he had the right to appoint a minister. In 1739, angered by the stand-off, Downes threatened to open the building as a chapel for Dissenters. A compromise was finally reached that the Vicar would have the right to choose the minister, but that the first minister would be a relative of Downes. This required an Act of Parliament, following which, it was consecrated to Saint Paul on 22 May 1740.

A John Snetzler organ was installed in 1755. A dome was added to the chapel's tower in 1769. In 1824, the church was placed in its own parish. A memorial to Reverend Alexander Mackenzie, designed by Francis Legatt Chantrey, was added around this time.

Following the trend of supposed slum clearance in the 1930s, the church's congregation dwindled, and St Paul's closed in 1937. It was demolished the following year, and the St Paul's Gardens were laid out on the site, later becoming known as the Peace Gardens. The organ was removed to All Saints in Wingerworth, while the Chantrey memorial was moved to Sheffield Cathedral. Many of the remains in the burial ground were relocated to Abbey Lane Cemetery.

Some of the old stone was repurposed by the contractor who demolished the church, and can still be seen in a row of houses built along Trap Lane in Bents Green in the west of the city.
