= Nigel Cox (doctor) =

English physician

Nigel Leigh Cox (born 1945 in Surrey) is an English consultant rheumatologist and one of the few doctors in Britain to have been charged with attempted murder. In 1992 he was convicted of the attempted murder of patient Lillian Boyes, and received a suspended sentence.

== Career ==
Cox worked at the Royal Hampshire County Hospital, Winchester, England.

== Lillian Boyes ==
In 1991 Lillian Boyes, then 70, entered the Royal Hampshire County Hospital. Cox was her consultant and had been treating Boyes for 13 years. As her rheumatoid arthritis became worse, she pleaded with him to end her life. Boyes had developed ulcers and abscesses on both her arms and legs. She had a rectal sore, that penetrated to the bone, and fractured vertebrae. She had also developed gangrene from steroid treatment. She weighed 42 kg (6 st 9 lb; 93 lb). According to the hospital chaplain, 'When anyone touched her you could hear the bones move about in their joints. The sound will stay with me to the grave'.

Five days before Boyes' death, she had pleaded for doctors to end her life. They refused, and she decided to stop her steroid treatment. However her pain became worse and she was unable to absorb the diamorphine that Dr Cox prescribed as pain relief. Boyes was administering 50 mg an hour but a nurse stated, "She howled and screamed like a dog" when anybody touched her.

By 16 August, Boyes was not expected to last the day. Dr Cox administered 100 mg of diamorphine. However Boyes was still crying out in pain. Dr Cox ultimately injected her with the potassium chloride. After she died, Patrick, one of her sons, thanked Cox. In Cox's view, he probably shortened her life by "between 15 minutes and an hour."

Cox entered the amount used in the hospital log, twice the amount needed to cause death. It was then noticed by a nurse, who reported it. Cox signed the cause of death as having been bronchial pneumonia.

Cox was arrested for attempted murder and suspended for 18 months by the hospital, though he was allowed to teach at another hospital and continue his private practice.

== Trial ==
Cox was tried at Winchester Crown Court in September 1992 by Mr Justice Ognall. Cox was charged with attempted murder, since it was impossible to conclusively prove that the injection he gave killed her. He was given a 12-month suspended sentence. Boyes' family supported his actions throughout the trial.

== Post-trial career ==
In November 1992, the professional conduct committee of the General Medical Council decided to take no further action. Cox returned to his former job in February 1993, under supervision.

== See also ==
- John Bodkin Adams – British suspected serial killer acquitted in 1957 of murdering an elderly patient.
- Leonard Arthur – British doctor acquitted in 1981 of murdering a Down's Syndrome baby
- Howard Martin – British doctor who admitted hastening the deaths of two patients
- David Moor – British doctor acquitted in 1999 of murdering a terminally ill patient. Moor admitted in a press interview to having killed 300 patients over 30 years
