= 2011 Stepping Hill Hospital poisoning incident =

2011 serial murder in the United Kingdom

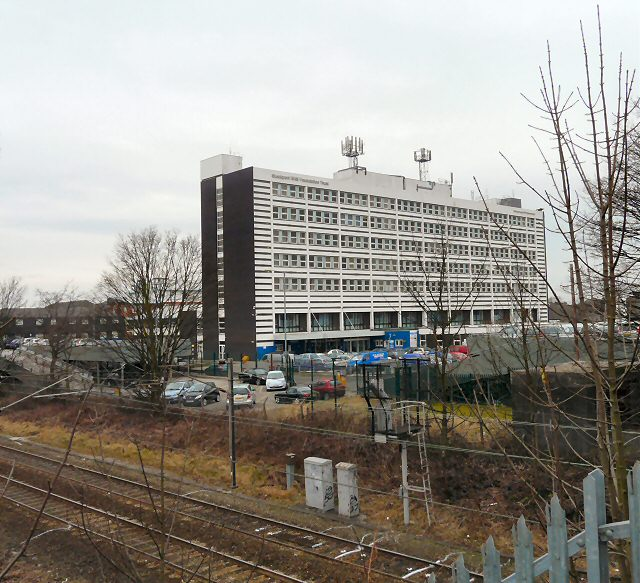
- Stepping Hill Hospital in 2010
- Location: Stockport, Greater Manchester, United Kingdom

In 2011, multiple deaths occurred at Stepping Hill Hospital in Stockport, Greater Manchester, England. After suspicions were raised concerning the similarities of the deaths, a murder inquiry was launched. Nurse Victorino Chua was found to have poisoned several patients with insulin. He was convicted of murder in 2015 and sentenced to life imprisonment.

== Background and investigation ==
The investigation was sparked by a nurse on a ward at the hospital, who noticed that several patients on the ward had unexpectedly low blood sugar levels. An investigation suggested that a number of saline ampoules and saline drips had been contaminated with insulin, and this was believed to have lowered the blood sugar levels in the patients.

Insulin is a hormone produced by the pancreas to allow the uptake of glucose in the blood to be used by the muscles and cells of the body for energy. The brain requires a constant supply of glucose in order to be able to function properly. As insulin lowers the level of glucose in the blood, if too much of it is present in the circulation this can quickly lead to lowered blood glucose levels, commonly known as low blood sugar (or hypoglycemia); which as a consequence negatively affects the functioning of the brain and central nervous system. This can be rapidly and irreversibly fatal if not recognised and treated early enough. At Stepping Hill it was suspected that, due to the increased levels of insulin in the patients' bloodstreams, they quickly became hypoglycemic and three confirmed fatalities occurred. A number of other patients are also believed by police to have been poisoned in this way, though most did not suffer fatal consequences. Two further deaths in the A1 and A3 wards were added to the investigation on 21 July.

Three patients' deaths – two elderly men, George Keep, 84 and Arnold Lancaster, 71, and a woman, Tracey Arden, 44 – were attributed to the alleged contamination, although it was also reported that each of the patients also had underlying medical conditions that made them weaker. On 21 July 2011, it was confirmed that two more patients' deaths were being linked to the investigation, bringing the death count to five. Greater Manchester Police (GMP) announced that the inquiry into how saline solutions had been contaminated with insulin would form the basis of a murder inquiry. During the investigation, 60 detectives were involved in determining how and when the saline solutions were contaminated. Meanwhile, several armed police guards were stationed at the hospital, and staff were made to work in pairs when administering medication to patients.

== Rebecca Leighton ==
On 20 July 2011, GMP confirmed that they had arrested a 27-year-old nurse – Rebecca Jane Leighton, who worked at the hospital in wards A1 and A3 – in connection with the murder inquiry. The Nursing and Midwifery Council opened a fitness to practice investigation after the arrest of Leighton. On 22 July, Leighton appeared at Manchester City Magistrates' Court. She was charged with three counts of criminal damage with intent to endanger life, three counts of criminal damage being reckless as to whether life was being endangered, and one charge of theft. She was remanded in custody to next appear at Manchester Crown Court on 1 August.

Charges against Leighton were dropped on 2 September 2011. The Crown Prosecution Service said it was "no longer appropriate" to continue the case against her. Evidence that was expected to appear in support of the charges had not become available. Nazir Afzal, Chief Crown Prosecutor for the North West, said Leighton had been charged on the basis there was "reasonable suspicion she had committed the offences and there were reasonable grounds for believing the continuing investigation would provide further evidence within a reasonable amount of time". She subsequently hired celebrity publicist Max Clifford to help clear her name.

On 2 December 2011, it was reported that Leighton had been dismissed from her job as a nurse at Stepping Hill Hospital. She had been suspended ever since the allegations were first made nearly five months earlier. She appealed against her termination in a hearing in February 2012, but the trust dismissed the appeal. The trust was unable to comment due to confidentiality issues and there was no response from Leighton's lawyers. It was also revealed on that day that police were investigating a total of 19 deaths at the hospital as possible victims of saline poisoning.

== Victorino Chua ==
Victorino Chua
- Born: 1965 or 1966 (age 59–60)
- Penalty: Life imprisonment

On 5 January 2012, it was revealed that a death had occurred on 31 December 2011, after Leighton had been dismissed, and was now being linked to the investigation. Forty-six-year-old Victorino Chua, a nurse at the hospital, had been arrested amid claims that forms had been altered and a patient given extra medication. He was later also questioned on the earlier deaths. He was not charged with any offence and was placed on police bail. By July 2012, GMP stated that they were making good progress in the investigation, that 22 people had been poisoned and that seven deaths had occurred.

On 29 March 2014, Chua was charged with the murders of Tracey Arden, Arnold Lancaster and Alfred Derek Weaver, and 31 other offences including grievous bodily harm and attempted poisoning. He was remanded in custody to appear at Manchester Magistrates' Court later. The prosecution argued that Chua had decided to take out his personal frustrations on patients "for reasons truly known only to himself". On 18 May 2015, Chua was convicted on two counts of murder. He was found not guilty of murdering Arnold Lancaster, who had been suffering from terminal cancer, but was convicted of attempting to cause him and 20 other patients grievous bodily harm with intent by poisoning. He was also found guilty of eight offences of unlawfully administering or causing to be taken by another person any poison or destructive or noxious thing with intent to injure, aggrieve or annoy, or attempt to do so, after deliberately altering prescriptions. The jury at Manchester Crown Court had deliberated for 11 days. Mr Justice Openshaw sentenced Chua, a Filipino national, to life imprisonment with a minimum term of 35 years, meaning he will be 84 years old when he becomes eligible for parole.

== See also ==
- Benjamin Geen, British nurse who murdered two patients and committed grievous bodily harm to 15 others
- Lucy Letby, British nurse who murdered seven infants and attempted murder on another eight
