= David Moor =

British doctor

John David Moor (1947 – 14 October 2000) was a British general practitioner who was prosecuted in 1999 for the euthanasia of a patient. He was found not guilty but admitted in a press interview to having helped up to 300 people to die. He was the first doctor in Britain to be tried solely for the mercy killing of a patient.

David Moor

== Career ==
Moor worked as a GP in Fenham, Newcastle upon Tyne, but retired just before his trial in 1999.

== George Liddell ==
George Liddell was an 85-year-old former ambulance driver and a widower, who had cancer of the bowel. An operation was done to remove part of his bowel, but there was still some cancerous tissue left in surrounding fatty tissue and the liver. Liddell was sent home by the hospital to live with his daughter and to be treated by Moor and a team of nurses. The patient's condition deteriorated and he became depressed and appeared to be in significant pain. Moor prescribed 5 mg of diamorphine to be taken at intervals, but this had to be doubled when the pain got worse. It was agreed by his carers he was "terminally ill".

It was agreed to send Liddell to a hospice. Moor set the diamorphine level at a rate of 30 mg per 24-hours by means of a syringe driver. Liddell's breathing got worse and on 19 July 1997 Moor gave him an injection of diamorphine and chlorpromazine. Within about 20 minutes Liddell was dead.

The case would have gone unnoticed, but when The Sunday Times published an article by Michael Irwin on euthanasia, journalist Rachel Ellis asked Moor his opinion on the subject. Moor said that he had given many patients overdoses of diamorphine, a comment he repeated in an interview on television. In particular, his statement that "This week I helped two patients on the way to a pain-free release from their painful agony and suffering" and that he had perhaps helped 10 patients per year for 30 years attracted considerable media attention. One newspaper called Moor "Britain's greatest serial killer" and referred to him as "Doctor Death".

== Trial ==
The trial, presided over by Mr Justice Hooper, took place at Newcastle Crown Court on 4 April 1999 and concluded on 11 May 1999. It was prosecuted by James Goss QC and Moor was defended by Anthony Arlidge QC. One key turning point in the case was the exclusion of toxicological evidence regarding the amount of diamorphine given, calling into question whether the final injection had in fact caused death.

The jury took 65 minutes to find Moor not guilty. Mr Justice Hooper awarded the defence team only two-thirds of their costs, because Moor had brought the prosecution on himself by "very silly remarks to the press" and by lying to the NHS and the police.

Although found not guilty, friends said the stress of the trial took its toll on Moor's health, leading to serious illness, alcohol problems, a divorce and a drink-driving conviction. He died of a suspected heart attack, aged 53.

== Reaction ==
Michael Wilks, chairman of the British Medical Association's ethics committee, said after the trial that guidelines for doctors were insufficiently clear: "We are no further along the road towards any change in the law on euthanasia [...] This case just tells us that doctors who take the law into their own hands, who intend to kill their patients, as it was originally thought that Dr Moor had, are likely to be prosecuted."

Broadcaster Ludovic Kennedy said: "Dr Moor should never have been tried — the whole trial was a complete waste of time and money [...] He was only doing what hundreds and hundreds of doctors do in this country every year. The sooner the law is changed to allow doctors to legally help people on their way, the better."

== See also ==
- John Bodkin Adams – British doctor acquitted in 1957 of murdering an elderly patient.
- Leonard Arthur – British doctor acquitted in 1981 of murdering a baby with Down's Syndrome
- Nigel Cox – British doctor convicted of attempted euthanasia in 1992
- Ben Geen – British nurse convicted of murdering two people and committing grievous bodily harm against 15 others
