= Abbey Lane Cemetery =

Cemetery in Beauchief

Coordinates: 53.3375°N 1.4903°W

Abbey Lane Sheffield
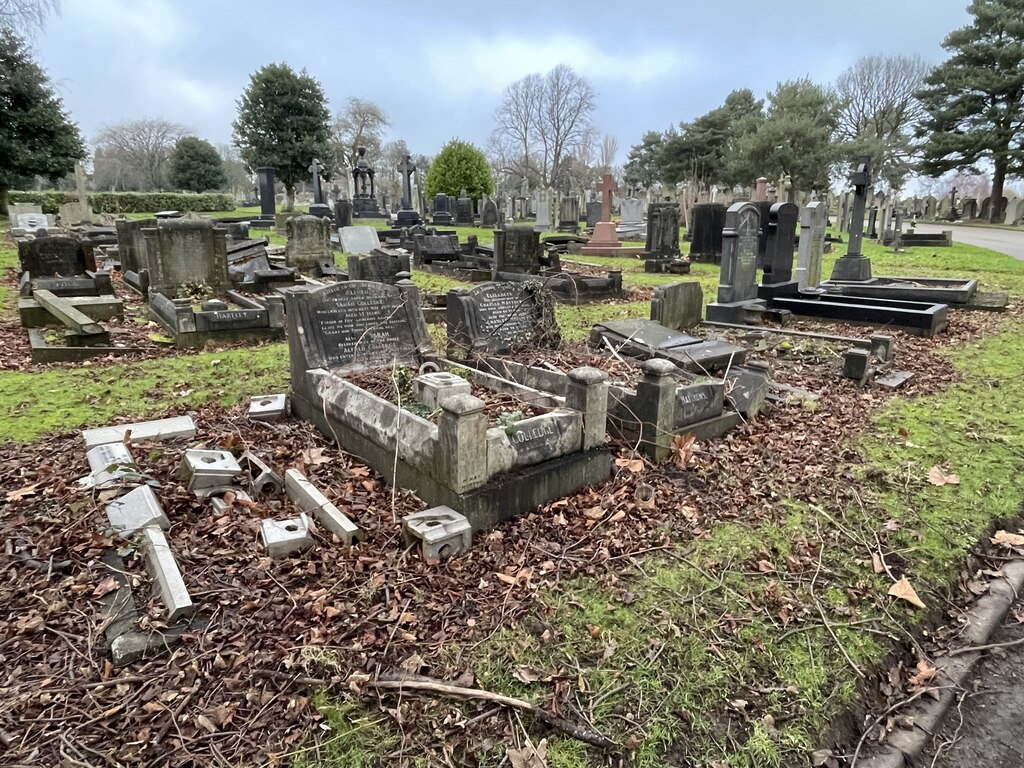
- Abbey Lane, Cemetery

Details
- Established: 1849
- Location: Abbey Lane, Beauchief, Sheffield, South Yorkshire
- Country: United Kingdom
- Type: Anglican cemetery
- Style: Victoria
- Owned by: Sheffield City Council
- Website: Sheffield City Council
- Find a Grave: Abbey Lane Sheffield

Abbey Lane Cemetery is a cemetery located on Abbey Lane, Beauchief, Sheffield.

== History ==
The cemetery was established in 1849. Following the demolition of St. Paul's Church in 1938, many of the remains from the churchyard were transferred to the cemetery.

The cemetery features a number of Commonwealth War Graves, including 21 World War I, and 59 World War II casualties.

Hutcliffe Wood Crematorium is located at the cemetery.
