= Horton General Hospital =

- Oxford University Hospitals NHS Foundation Trust
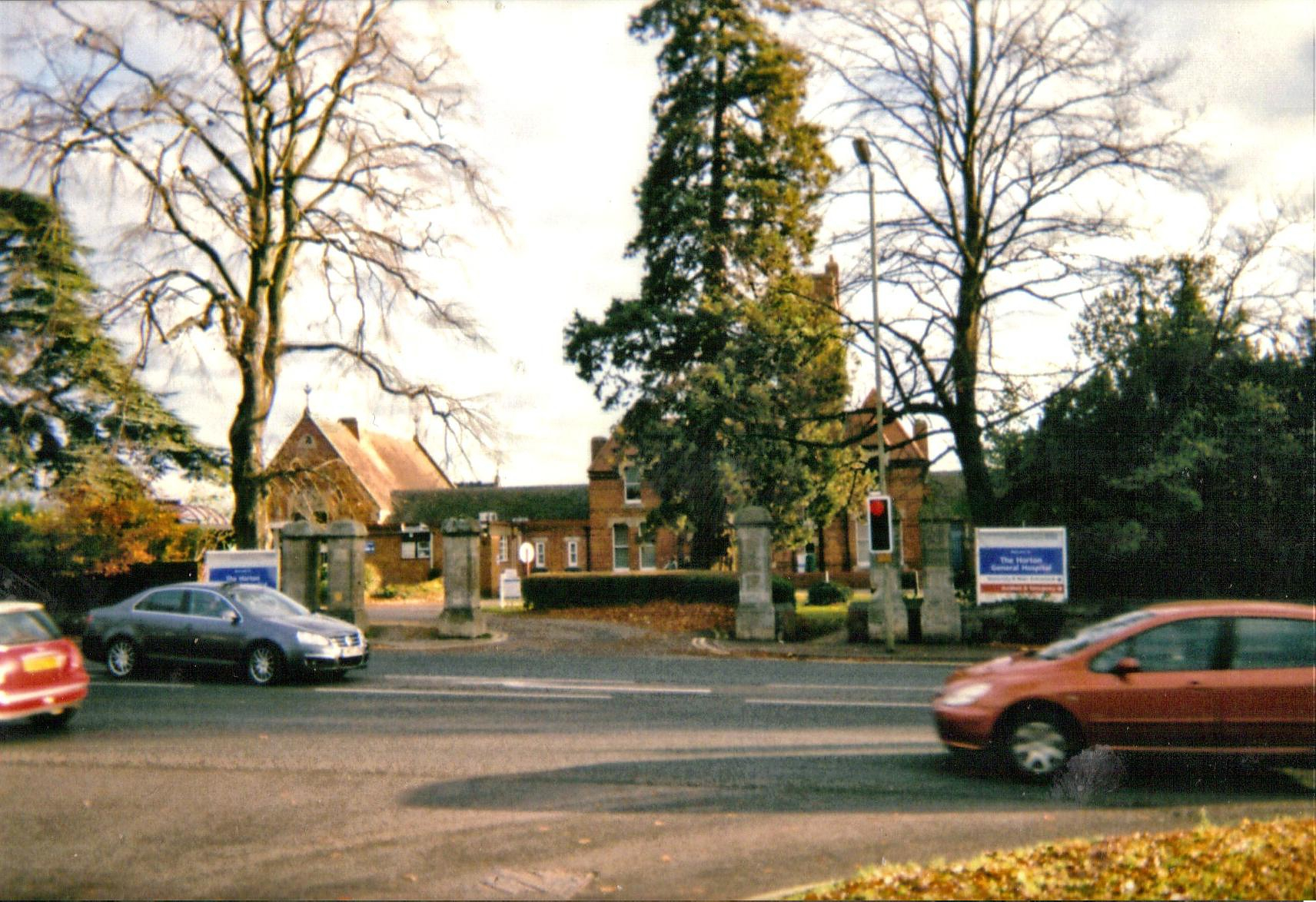
- Horton General Hospital in 2010

- Shown in Oxfordshire

Geography
- Location: Banbury, Oxfordshire, England
- Coordinates: 52.05373°N 1.33628°W

Organisation
- Care system: National Health Service
- Type: General
- Affiliated university: University of Oxford

Services
- Emergency department: Yes
- Beds: 236

History
- Founded: 1872

Links
- Website: www.ouh.nhs.uk/hospitals/horton/

The Horton General Hospital is a National Health Service hospital located on the Oxford Road, in the Calthorpe ward of Banbury. It is managed by Oxford University Hospitals NHS Foundation Trust.

== History ==
=== Pre-1948 ===
The earliest part of the hospital is the Italianate Elms House on Oxford Road, a substantial villa built in 1863 for Jonathan Gillet, one of the senior partners of Gillet’s Bank.

The main part of the hospital was founded as a result of a gift from Mary-Ann Horton, a local heiress. It was designed by the architect Charles Henry Driver and built by Franklin and Sons of Deddington. Construction work had started on 19 July 1869 and it opened in 1872.

CLH Pemberton became the hospital's first Honorary Physician and a member of the Committee of Management in 1872. A children's ward was added in 1897.

1926 was a momentous year with both the first resident house surgeon being appointed and the hospital being approved as a training school for nurses that year. In the second half of the 1930s, plans were prepared to construct extensive new buildings: these buildings were erected in the 1940s, 1950s and 1960s.

=== 1948-1999 ===
The first consultant started work at the hospital in 1945. The hospital became part of the National Health Service in 1948.

The Italianate Elms House on Oxford Road became the local psychiatric unit in 1961. The hospital became a National Health Service Trust in April 1993.

=== 2000 and later ===
In 2005, there were rumours that the hospital might have to close. This led Banbury's MP, Tony Baldry, plus a large proportion of the town's population, to start a campaign to keep the hospital open. The rumours proved to be unfounded, since the plans had already been abandoned by both the NHS Trust and the Health Minister.

In 2006, the Horton attracted publicity because Benjamin Geen, a nurse employed there, was convicted of two murders and fifteen counts of grievous bodily harm in April of that year. During December 2003 and January 2004 he had allegedly poisoned patients because he got a thrill out of trying to resuscitate them.

Oxfordshire Clinical Commissioning Group approved controversial plans to permanently downgrade the hospital’s maternity service to a midwife-led only unit in August 2017, but the Independent Reconfiguration panel recommended in March 2018 that "further action was required locally before a final decision is made about the future of maternity services in Oxfordshire".
