= John Bodkin Adams =

British physician and fraudster (1899–1983)

- Adams in the 1940s
- Born: 21 January 1899; Randalstown, Ireland
- Died: 4 July 1983 (aged 84); Eastbourne, England
- Occupation: General practitioner
- Known for: Suspected serial killer
- Criminal charge: Fraud
- Criminal penalty: Struck off the Medical Register in 1957 (reinstated in 1961)

John Bodkin Adams (21 January 1899 – 4 July 1983) was a British general practitioner, convicted fraudster, and suspected serial killer. He was born to Samuel and Ellen Adams. The family were listed as ‘Christian Brethren’. Between 1946 and 1956, 163 of his patients died while in comas, which was deemed to be worthy of investigation. In addition, 132 out of 310 patients had left Adams money or items in their wills.

Adams was tried and acquitted for the murder of one patient in 1957, while another count of murder was withdrawn by the prosecution in what was later described as "an abuse of process" by the presiding judge, Patrick Devlin, Baron Devlin, causing questions to be asked in Parliament about the prosecution's handling of events. Adams was found guilty in a subsequent trial of thirteen offences of prescription drug fraud, lying on cremation forms, obstruction of justice during a police search and failing to keep a dangerous drugs register. He was struck off by the General Medical Council in 1957 and reinstated in 1961 after two failed applications.

Adams's first trial was described as "one of the greatest murder trials of all time" and dubbed the "murder trial of the century." The trial also established the doctrine of double effect, whereby a doctor giving treatment with the aim of relieving pain may lawfully, as an unintentional result, shorten life. Because of the publicity surrounding Adams's committal hearing, the law was changed to allow defendants to ask for such hearings to be held in private. Furthermore, although a defendant had not been required within recorded legal history to give evidence in his own defence as part of the right to silence in England and Wales, the judge underlined in his summing-up that no prejudice should be attached by the jury to Adams not doing so.

Scotland Yard's files on the case were initially closed to the public for 75 years and would have remained so until 2033. Following a request by historian Pamela Cullen, special permission was granted in 2003 to reopen the files, which have since been used by several researchers.

== Early years ==
John Bodkin Adams was born and raised in Randalstown, Ulster, Ireland, into a deeply religious family of Plymouth Brethren, an austere Protestant sect of which he remained a member for his entire life. (Note: He left £500 in his will to Marine Hall, his local Brethren congregation.) His father, Samuel, was a preacher in the local congregation and a watchmaker by profession; he also had a passionate interest in cars which he would pass on to John. In 1896, Samuel was 39 years of age when he married Ellen Bodkin, aged 30. John was their first son, followed by a brother, William Samuel, in 1903. In Bodkin’s early childhood the family gained the employment of a presbyterian domestic servant named Margory Millar. By the time the family moved to spittle hill in Coleraine they no longer kept a servant. In 1914, Adams's father died of a stroke. Four years later, his brother died in the 1918 influenza pandemic.

After attending Coleraine Academical Institution for several years Adams matriculated at The Queen's University of Belfast at age 17. There he was seen as a "plodder" and "lone wolf" by his lecturers and, partly because of an illness (probably tuberculosis), he missed a year of studies. He graduated in 1921, having failed to qualify for honours. In 1921, surgeon Arthur Rendle Short offered Adams a position as assistant houseman at Bristol Royal Infirmary. He spent a year there but did not prove a success. On Short's advice, Adams applied for a job as a general practitioner in a Christian practice in Eastbourne, Sussex.

== Eastbourne ==
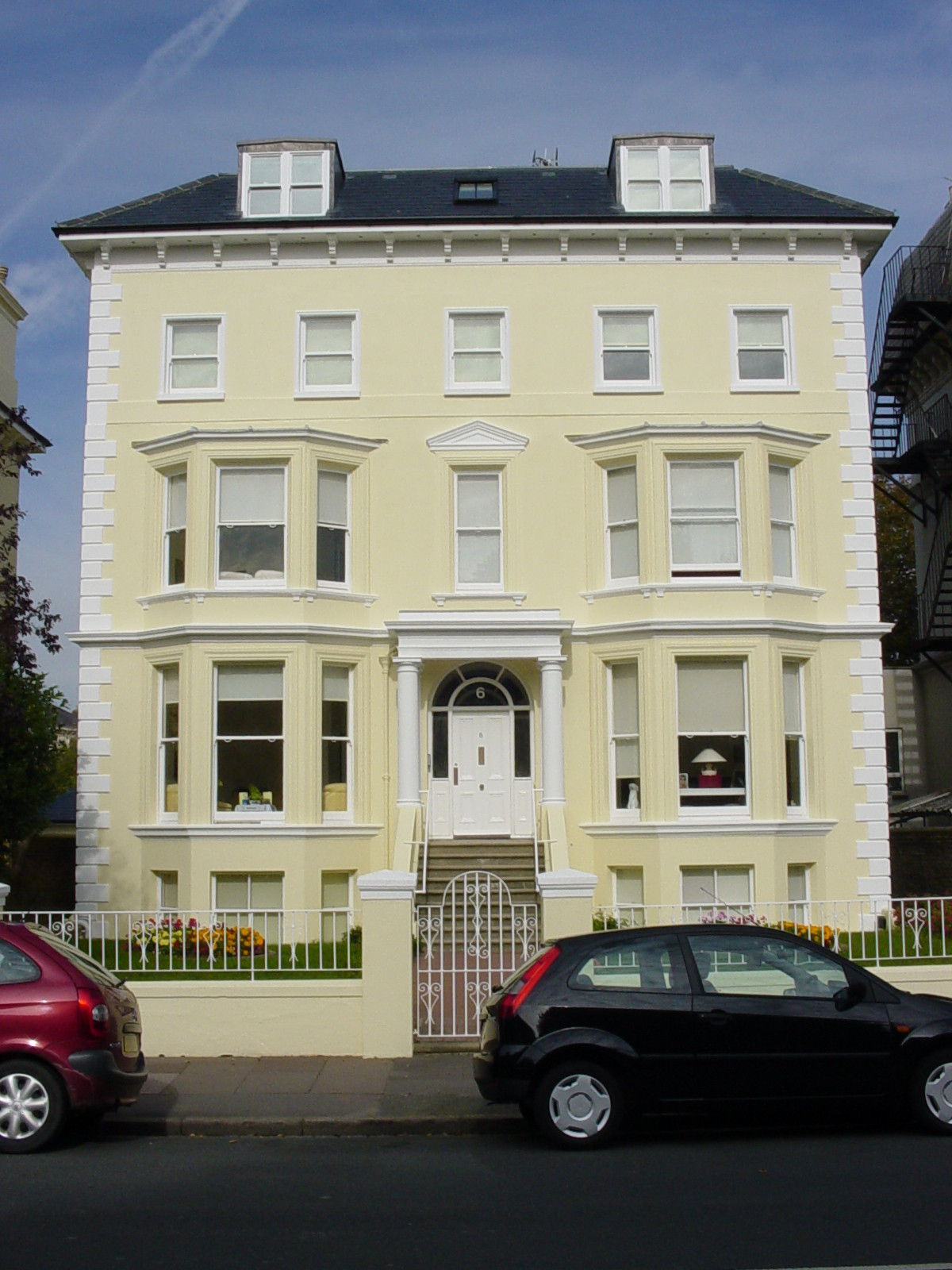
Kent Lodge, where Adams lived from 1929 to 1983

Adams arrived in Eastbourne in 1922, where he lived with his mother and his cousin, Sarah Florence Henry. In 1927 the Eastbourne Gazette released an article which highlights the suspicious nature of Adams' practice. A patient Frederick Eykyn, whom a will worth £3642 was released upon his death, was found died by gunshot wound in his coal cellar. While his widow acknowledged his nervous depression, she was insistent he was in a fine mood the night before his death, never made apparent any suicidal ideation or owned a firearm. Adams disputed this being one of the first on the scene the Sunday morning Eykyn was found, Eykyn being his long-term patient. In 1929, he borrowed £2,000 (equivalent to £100,753 at 2022 prices) from a patient, William Mawhood, and bought an eighteen-room house called Kent Lodge, in Trinity Trees (then known as Seaside Road), a select address. Adams would frequently invite himself to the Mawhoods' residence at mealtime, even bringing his mother and cousin. He also began charging items to their accounts at local stores without their permission. Mrs Mawhood would later describe Adams to the police as "a real scrounger". When Mr Mawhood died in 1949, Adams visited his widow, uninvited, and took a 22-carat-gold pen from her bedroom dressing table, saying he wanted "something of her husband's". He never visited her again.

Gossip regarding Adams's unconventional methods had started by the mid-1930s. In 1935, he inherited £7,385 from a patient, Matilda Whitton; her whole estate amounted to £11,465, equivalent to £416,489 and £646,588 respectively at 2022 values. Whitton's will was contested by her relatives but upheld in court, though a codicil giving Adams's mother £100 was overturned. Adams then began receiving "anonymous postcards" about him "bumping off" patients, as he admitted in a newspaper interview in 1957. These were received at a rate of three or four a year until the Second World War, and then commenced again in 1945.

In 1939 or 1941, Adams started injecting a Mrs. Agnes Pike with drugs, including morphine. After some time in his care, Mrs. Pike's health deteriorated so much that the family, alerted by the proprietor of the guest house Mrs. Pike was in, called another doctor named Philip Mathew. Mathew established that there was no medical reason for Mrs Pike to be treated. Adams's drugs, notably the morphine, put her in such a state that she was unable to recall her own name or age. She was removed from Adams's care and after about eight weeks she made an almost full recovery; she regained her mental faculties and was well enough to go out and do her own shopping. This was a rare case of Adams's victim surviving.

Adams stayed in Eastbourne throughout the war, and in 1941 he gained a diploma in anaesthetics. He worked one day a week in a local hospital, where he acquired a reputation as a bungler: he would fall asleep during operations, eat cakes, count money, and even mix up the anaesthetic gas tubes, leading to patients waking up or turning blue. In 1943 his mother died, and in 1952 his cousin Sarah developed cancer. Adams gave her an injection half an hour before she died.

January 1945, Adams attended an event hosted by the Y.W.C.A, a Christian group that collected charity during war times to house nurses. The event, alongside Adams, was attended by prominent British socialites for instance; Deborah Cavendish the Duchess of Devonshire, lady Helen Violet, and lady Andrew Cavendish.

Adams's career was very successful; the journalist Rodney Hallworth later claimed that by 1956 he was reputed to be the wealthiest doctor in England, although without citing any evidence. A similarly unsourced claim that "he was probably the wealthiest GP in England" was made by Cullen. Adams attended some famous and influential people in the region, including MP and Olympic medal winner Lord Burghley, society painter Oswald Birley, Admiral Robert Prendergast, industrialist Sir Alexander Maguire, the 10th Duke of Devonshire, Eastbourne's Chief Constable Richard Walker and many businessmen.

After years of rumours and Adams having been mentioned in at least 132 wills of his patients, on 23 July 1956 Eastbourne police received an anonymous call about a death. It was from Leslie Henson, the music-hall performer, whose friend Gertrude Hullett had died unexpectedly while being treated by Adams.

== Police investigation ==
On 23 July 1956, the day Mrs Hullett died, the Eastbourne coroner notified Walker that from his post-mortem her death did not appear to be natural. The police began taking statements from individuals who had been in contact with her shortly before her death, many of whom believed that she had committed suicide. One of her friends, who was also her executor, provided three letters she had written in April 1956 and had placed with her will, which indicated that she had contemplated suicide then. A second post mortem conducted by a Home Office pathologist concluded that the cause of death was barbiturate poisoning.

After the second post-mortem, the investigation was taken over from Eastbourne police on 17 August 1956 by two officers from the Metropolitan Police's Murder Squad. The senior officer, Detective Superintendent Herbert Hannam of Scotland Yard, was known for having secured a conviction in the Teddington Towpath Murders in 1953, although the defence counsel, Peter Rawlinson, called into question Hannam's evidence on how the confession was obtained. In view of the opinion Hannam later expressed, that detectives must sometimes ignore the law, his methods are open to question. He was assisted by Detective Sergeant Charles Hewett. Hannam was in the unusual position that, instead of having to find a suspect for a known crime, he had a known suspect in Adams but needed to link him to more serious crimes than forging prescriptions, making false statements and mishandling drugs. Devlin suggests that Hannam became fixated on the idea that Adams had murdered many elderly patients for legacies, regarding his receiving a legacy as grounds for suspicion, although Adams was generally only a minor beneficiary.

Investigators decided to focus on cases from 1946 to 1956. Of the 310 death certificates examined by Home Office pathologist Francis Camps, 163 were considered by Camps to be worthy of further investigation. This was because, firstly, a very high proportion — some 42% of all 310 of Adams's deceased patients — were diagnosed as having died of cerebral thrombosis or cerebral haemorrhage against an average in the late 1950s of around 15% for elderly, bedridden patients, and secondly the 163 certificates related to Adams's patients who had died while in a coma could be suggestive of the administration of a narcotic or barbiturate as well as the cause stated. The police took numerous statements from nurses who had treated Adams's patients and their relatives. Some were generally favourable to him, but others claimed Adams had given patients "special injections" of substances that were unknown to the nurses and which Adams refused to disclose to them. The statements also claimed that his habit was to ask the nurses to leave the room before injections were given and that he would also isolate patients from their relatives, hindering contact with them. However several of the witnesses whom Hannam had questioned orally refused to give sworn statements to confirm their allegations against Adams. During the trial, the assertions of Mrs Morrell's nurses that they did not know what Adams was injecting or that he did not give injections in front of them were disproved by the contents of their own notebooks.

=== Obstruction ===
On 24 August the British Medical Association (BMA) sent a letter to all doctors in Eastbourne reminding them of "Professional Secrecy" (i.e. patient confidentiality) if interviewed by the police. The police were frustrated by this move, although some local doctors ignored it and gave statements relating either to deceased patients or, in one instance, one who was alive. The action of the BMA was part of a concerted attempt to secure better terms for its members, whose pay had remained virtually static since the National Health Service had been set up in 1948; this action later led to talk of an all-out strike.

The Attorney-General, Sir Reginald Manningham-Buller (who customarily prosecuted cases of poisoning or delegated them to the Solicitor General), wrote to the BMA secretary, Angus Macrae, "to try to get him to remove the ban". The impasse continued until on 8 November Manningham-Buller met Macrae to convince him of the importance of the case. During this meeting, in a highly unusual move, he passed Hannam's confidential 187-page report on Adams to Macrae. His intention was to convince the BMA of the seriousness of the accusations and the need to obtain cooperation from local doctors. Macrae took the report to the President of the BMA and returned it the next day. Convinced of the seriousness of the accusations, Macrae dropped his opposition to doctors talking to the police.

It has been speculated that Macrae also copied the report and passed it on to the defence, and conspiracy theorists have claimed that Manningham-Buller did so intending to assist the defence case, but there is no evidence of this. However the incident does call Manningham-Buller's competence into question, and he was strongly criticised at the time. (Note: The Home Secretary, Gwilym Lloyd-George, wrote to Manningham-Buller that: "The disclosure of this document is likely to cause me considerable embarrassment. As you know, police reports have always been treated as highly confidential documents and it has been the invariable practice to refuse to disclose their contents to Parliament or to individual Members. Indeed I should have no hesitation in claiming privilege if their production were required in a court of law." He ended: "I can only hope that no harm will result.")

On 28 November 1956, opposition Labour Party MPs Stephen Swingler and Hugh Delargy gave notice of two questions to be asked in the House of Commons regarding the affair, one asking what "reports [the Attorney-General] has sent" to the General Medical Council (GMC) in the "past six months". Manningham-Buller replied that he had "had no communications" with the GMC, but only with an officer of it. He did not mention the report. Instead, he instigated an investigation into a leak, later concluding that Hannam himself had passed information regarding the meeting with Macrae to a journalist, probably Rodney Hallworth of the Daily Mail.

=== Meeting Hannam ===
On 1 October 1956, Hannam met Adams, (Note: In court, the defence would accuse Hannam of intentionally "waylaying" Adams in order to informally question him. Hannam denied this.) who asked, "You are finding all these rumours untrue, aren't you?" Hannam mentioned a prescription Adams had forged: "That was very wrong [...] I have had God's forgiveness for it", Adams replied. Hannam brought up the deaths of Adams's patients and his receipt of legacies from them. Adams answered: "A lot of those were instead of fees — I don't want money. What use is it? I paid £1,100 super tax last year." Hannam later mentioned, "Mr Hullett left you £500." Adams replied, "Now, now, he was a life-long friend [...] I even thought it would be more than it was." Finally, when asked why he had stated untruthfully on cremation forms that he was not to inherit from the deceased, Adams said:

Oh, that wasn't done wickedly, God knows it wasn't. We always want cremations to go off smoothly for the dear relatives. If I said I knew I was getting money under the Will they might get suspicious and I like cremations and burials to go smoothly. There was nothing suspicious really. It was not deceitful.

=== Search ===
On 24 November, Hannam, Hewett and the head of Eastbourne CID, Detective Inspector Pugh, searched Adams's house with a warrant issued (in Pugh's name) under the Dangerous Drugs Act 1951. When told they were looking for "morphine, heroin, pethidine and the like", Adams was surprised: "Oh, that group. You will find none here. I haven't any. I very seldom ever use them," he said. When Hannam asked for Adams's Dangerous Drugs Register, which was at that time the record of those controlled drugs ordered, but not how they were used, Adams responded: "I don't know what you mean. I keep no register." He had not kept one since 1949, although such failures were not uncommon at that period. When shown a list of dangerous drugs he had prescribed Morrell, and asked who administered them, Adams said, "I did nearly all. Perhaps the nurses gave some but mostly me." This was later contradicted by the contents of the nurses' notebooks produced during his trial. Hannam then observed, "Doctor, you prescribed for her 75 [heroin] tablets of 1/6-grain (≈ 10.8 mg) each] the day before she died." Adams replied, "Poor soul, she was in terrible agony. It was all used. I used them myself [...] Do you think it is too much?"

Devlin suggested that Hannam generally considered what a suspect said in interrogation was the best form of evidence, and that the police and prosecution case was based to a significant degree on admissions that Hannam had recorded Adams making. He considered that Hannam's records were reasonably accurate, although putting emphasis on matters that might assist a prosecution, as was the practice at the time. However Devlin considered that proof of guilt should be based as far as possible on facts rather than pre-trial statements to the police, and that an admission had to be taken as a whole, so that Adams's statement that he had used all 12 1/2 grains or 75 tablets of heroin could not be divorced from his claim that Mrs Morrell was in terrible agony.

Adams opened a cupboard for the police: amongst medicine bottles were "chocolates – slabs stuck – butter, margarine, sugar". While the officers inspected it, Adams walked to another cupboard and slipped two objects into his jacket pocket. Hannam and Pugh challenged him and Adams showed them two bottles of morphine; one he said was for Annie Sharpe, a patient and major witness who had died nine days earlier under his care; the other said "Mr Soden". Soden had died on 17 September 1956, but pharmacy records later showed he had never been prescribed morphine. Adams was later (after his main trial in 1957) convicted of obstructing the search, concealing the bottles and failing to keep a Dangerous Drugs register. Later at the police station, Adams told Hannam:

Easing the passing of a dying person isn't all that wicked. She [Morrell] wanted to die. That can't be murder. It is impossible to accuse a doctor.

In the basement of Adams's house, the police found, "a lot of unused china and silverware. In one room there were 20 new motor car tyres still in their wrappings and several new motor car leaf springs. Wines and spirits were stored in quantity." Hallworth reports that Adams was stockpiling in case of another World War. On the second floor, "one room was given over to an armoury [:] six guns in a glass-fronted display case, several automatic pistols". He had permits for these. Another room was used "wholly for photographic equipment. A dozen very expensive cameras in leather cases" lay around.

=== Sexuality ===
Adams became engaged around 1933 to Norah O'Hara (Note: She was the sister-in-law of one of Adams's Brethren friends (Norman Gray), and her father owned six butchers in the town.) but called it off in 1935 after her father had bought them a house and furnished it. Various explanations have been suggested: Surtees suggests that it was because Adams's mother did not want him to marry "trade" though he also quotes a rumour that Adams wanted O'Hara's father to change his will to favour his daughters. Adams remained friends with O'Hara his whole life and remembered her in his will. (Note: He left her: "in gratitude and memories of our long-standing friendship any one item of furniture or personal or household or domestic use ornament or consumption belonging to me at the time of my death".)

In December, the police acquired a memorandum belonging to a Daily Mail journalist, (Note: Probably Rodney Hallworth.) concerning rumours of homosexuality between "a police officer, a magistrate and a doctor". The "doctor" directly implied Adams. This information had come, according to the reporter, directly from Hannam. The 'magistrate' was Sir Roland Gwynne, Mayor of Eastbourne (1929–31) and brother of Rupert Gwynne, MP for Eastbourne (1910–24). Gwynne was Adams's patient and known to visit every day at 9:00 a.m. They went on frequent holidays together and had spent three weeks in Scotland that September. The 'police officer' was the Deputy Chief Constable of Eastbourne, Alexander Seekings. Hannam interviewed Gwynne on 4 February 1957, following which Gwynne severed all connection with Adams. Hannam's record of the interview does not refer to any homosexual acts (which were a criminal offence in 1956), and the police instead gave the journalist a dressing-down.

=== Arrest ===
Adams was first arrested on 24 November 1956 on 13 charges including false representation on cremation certificates and granted bail. He was arrested on 19 December 1956 and charged with the murder of Mrs. Morrell. When told of the charges, he said:

Murder... murder... Can you prove it was murder? [...] I didn't think you could prove it was murder. She was dying in any event.

Then, while he was being taken away from Kent Lodge, he reportedly gripped his receptionist's hand and told her: "I will see you in heaven."

Hannam considered he had collected enough evidence in at least four of the cases for prosecution to be warranted: regarding Clara Neil Miller, Julia Bradnum, Edith Alice Morrell and Gertrude Hullett. Of these, Adams was charged on one count: the murder of Morrell, but with the death of Mr. and Mrs. Hullett being used to prove 'system'. Although it was usual in 1956 for only one count of murder to be indicted, evidence of other suspected murders not being tried could be given, provided each such instance would, on its own facts, be capable of proof beyond reasonable doubt and strikingly similar to the case tried.

=== Adams and Eves ===
On 22 February 1957, the police were notified of a libellous and potentially prejudicial poem about the case titled Adams and Eves. It had been read at the Cavendish Hotel on the 13th by the manager in front of 150 guests. An officer spent ten days investigating and discovered a chain of hands through which the poem had passed and been recopied to be redistributed. The original author was not discovered; an unnamed Fleet Street journalist was suspected.

== Patients ==
=== Edith Alice Morrell ===
Morrell was a wealthy widow who suffered a stroke on 24 June 1948 while visiting her son in Cheshire. She was partially paralysed and was admitted to a hospital near Chester, where she received morphine injections for nine days from 27 June, prescribed by a Dr. Turner. Cullen suggests that Adams, supposedly her usual doctor, arrived there on 26 June, the day before she was first prescribed morphine for the pain. However, the Attorney-General's opening speech states that Mrs. Morrell was transferred to Eastbourne on 5 July 1948, only then becoming one of Adams's patients, and that he first prescribed morphine on 9 July, adding heroin on 21 July. Mrs. Morrell was not expected to live more than six months or so, but survived her stroke for over two years, suffering also from arthritis. Between July 1948 and August 1950, she received routine evening injections of morphine and heroin and her condition was stable, but from then, as her condition deteriorated, the dosages increased. An expert witness for the prosecution claimed that Mrs. Morrell would have become addicted, but the only apparent symptoms of this were attributed by the defence's expert to a second stroke.

Mrs. Morrell left an estate of £157,000 and made eight cash bequests of between £300 and £1,000. Cullen claims that in some of the several wills she made Adams was bequeathed large sums of money and her Rolls-Royce Silver Ghost (valued at £1,500). This appears incorrect and, in her will of 5 August 1950, the only outright bequest Mrs. Morrell made to Adams was a chest of silver cutlery worth £276. This will also awarded him a contingent right to the car and a Jacobean court cupboard, but only if Mrs. Morrell's son predeceased her, which Devlin noted was unlikely. A codicil of 13 September 1950 cut Adams out of her will completely. and she died on 13 November 1950 aged 81 without any further changes to her will. Adams certified the cause of death as "stroke" and on inspecting the body, slit her wrist to ensure she was dead. Despite the last codicil, Mrs. Morrell's son gave Adams the Rolls-Royce which was 19 years old, and the chest of silver cutlery. After Mrs. Morrell's death, he also took away an infrared lamp she had bought herself, worth £60. Adams billed Morrell's estate for 1,100 visits, costing £1,674 in total. The police estimated that Adams had visited Morrell a total of 321 times during her treatment. On her cremation form, Adams stated that "as far as I am aware" he had no pecuniary interest in the death, thereby avoiding the necessity of a post-mortem.

=== Gertrude Hullett ===
On 23 July 1956, Gertrude Hullett, another of Adams's patients, died aged 50. She had been depressed since the death of her husband four months earlier and had been prescribed sodium barbitone and sodium phenobarbitone. (Note: Over 80 days 1512 grains of the former and 6 1/4 grains of the latter were prescribed.) She had told Adams on frequent occasions of her wish to commit suicide. When questioned by the coroner, Adams said that he personally gave Mrs. Hullett two barbiturate tablets each morning, initially of 7 1/2 grains each, a normal dose, later reduced to two tablets of 6 grains each, then 5 grains. However, he did not ensure that she took both tablets daily and no attempt had been made to retrieve any that had been prescribed to the late Mr. Hullett but unused when he died.

On 17 July, Hullett wrote out a cheque to Adams for £1,000 – to pay for an MG car her husband had promised to buy him. Adams paid the cheque into his account the next day, and on being told that it would clear by the 21st, asked for it to be specially cleared – to arrive in his account the next day. On 19 July, Hullett is thought to have taken an overdose and was found the next morning in a coma. Adams was unavailable and a colleague, Dr. Harris, attended to her until Adams arrived later in the day. Not once during their discussion did Adams mention her depression or her barbiturate medication. They decided a cerebral haemorrhage was most likely. On 21 July, Dr. Shera, a pathologist, was called in to take a spinal fluid sample and immediately asked if her stomach contents should be examined in case of narcotic poisoning. Adams and Harris both opposed this. After Shera left, Adams visited a colleague at the Princess Alice Hospital in Eastbourne and asked about the treatment for barbiturate poisoning. He was told to give doses of 10 cc of Megimide every five minutes, and was given 100 cc to use. The recommended dose in the instructions was 100 cc to 200 cc. Dr. Cook also told him to put Hullett on an intravenous drip. Adams did not.

The next morning, at 8:30, Adams called the coroner to make an appointment for a private post-mortem. The coroner asked when the patient had died and Adams said she had not yet. Harris visited again that day and Adams still made no mention of potential barbiturate poisoning. When Harris had left, Adams gave a single injection of 10 cc of the Megimide. Hullett developed broncho-pneumonia and on the 23rd at 6:00 a.m. Adams gave Hullett oxygen. She died at 7:23 a.m. on 23 July. The results of a urine sample taken on 21 July were received after Hullett's death, on the 24th. It showed she had 115 grains of sodium barbitone in her body – twice the fatal dose.

An inquest was held into Hullett's death on 21 August. The coroner questioned Adams's treatment and in his summing up said that it was "extraordinary that the doctor, knowing the past history of the patient" did not "at once suspect barbiturate poisoning". He described Adams's 10 cc dose of Megimide as another "mere gesture". The inquest concluded that Hullett committed suicide: it was described as a "travesty" as, in the opinion of Cullen, with an ongoing police investigation, the inquest should have been adjourned until the investigation had concluded. However, the coroner asked Superintendent Hannam whether the police wished him to adjourn the inquest, to which Hannam replied that he had no application to make. After the inquest, the cheque for £1,000 disappeared.

Hullett left Adams her Rolls-Royce Silver Dawn (worth at least £2,900) in a will written five days before her overdose. Adams sold it six days before he was arrested.

== Before the trial ==
=== Case selection ===
Charles Hewett, Hannam's assistant, was quoted as saying that both officers were astounded at Manningham-Buller's decision to charge Adams with the murder of Morrell since her body had been cremated and therefore there was no evidence to present before a jury. This assertion was published after the deaths of both Hannam and Manningham-Buller. This shows a misunderstanding of the principle of corpus delicti, and his assertion that traces of drugs found in exhumed remains were more compelling as proof against Adams was disputed by Devlin, as the exhumations and subsequent post-mortems yielded nothing of interest. and as the pathologist concerned did not consider that the levels found were significant. Cullen also describes Morrell as "the weakest" case of the four the police deemed most suspicious. Devlin, who regarded none of the cases mentioned by Hallworth as being as strong as the Morrell case, despite it being six years old, suggested that, in an investigation covering a ten-year period, the police were unable to find a better case than the Morrell one.

In 1957, it was the job of the police to investigate reported crimes, to determine if one had been committed and to arrest a suspect. It was then the job of the Director of Public Prosecutions (DPP), or in very serious cases of the Attorney-General or Solicitor-General, to review the police case and decide whether to prosecute and, in more serious cases, what offences to prosecute. What to prosecute depends on legal issues and Devlin states that, to succeed in the murder case against Adams, the prosecution had to show, firstly, there had been an unnatural death, secondly, an act by Adams was capable of being murderous (such as an injection so large as to cause death) and finally Adams's intent to kill. The Attorney-General thought he had evidence that Adams had prescribed large quantities of opiates to Mrs. Morrell, Adams's own admissions that he had used them all on Mrs. Morrell and injected all or almost all of them himself, and a medical expert's testimony that the only possible reason to inject so much over a short time was to kill her.

Cullen mentions Mrs. Morrell, Mr. and Mrs. Hullett, Clara Neil Miller and Julia Bradnum as cases that Hannam regarded as warranting prosecution. However, in the cases of Mr. Hullett, Clara Neil Miller and Julia Bradnum there was no certainty of an unnatural death, as there was evidence in the committal hearing that Mr. Hullett died of a heart attack and, at their exhumations, the pathologist concluded Miller had died from pneumonia, and the condition of Bradnum's body did not allow a cause of death to be stated, so none of these were good cases. Mrs. Hullett had died an unnatural death, of a barbiturate overdose, but there was no evidence or admission that Adams had persuaded her to take that overdose and, had Mrs. Hullett's case been brought to trial after Adams's first acquittal, Devlin believed that a second acquittal was virtually certain. In these five cases, Adams may have contributed to the deaths in some way, but this would not have been sufficient for a capital murder conviction.

=== Committal hearing ===
The committal hearing opened in Lewes on 14 January 1957. In accordance with the legal rule applying in 1957, Adams was charged on the single count of murdering Mrs. Morrell, but the prosecution also alleged he had killed Mr. and Mrs. Hullett in a similar fashion, and introduced evidence relating to them as evidence of system, which the prosecution also wished to refer to in the Morrell trial. Despite the objections of the defence that this evidence was inadmissible, the magistrates allowed it but, in cross-examination, the defence forced an admission from the Crown's expert witness that Mr Hullett died of a coronary thrombosis. The hearing concluded on 24 January when, after a five-minute deliberation, Adams was committed for trial on the Morrell charge.

Melford Stevenson, who led the Crown's case at this hearing, made an explicit claim that Adams's instructions to especially clear Mrs. Hullett's cheque two days before her death showed that he knew she was to die very soon, using her wealth and foreseen death as evidence of critical similarities to the deaths of Mr. Morrell and Mrs. Hullett. He also made an implication, unsupported by evidence, that Adams had been involved in the administration of the drugs that caused her death. Devlin considered the police case that there were similarities in the deaths of Mrs. Morrell and Mrs. Hullett was not well founded, as the claimed similarities were not distinctive. Had the police found two recent cases similar to Mrs. Hullett's, where a patient had died of an overdose of pills prescribed by Adams, that might have shown the system, but the police found no such cases.

The Chairman of the magistrates was Sir Roland Gwynne, but he stepped down because of his close friendship with Adams. An exhibit that supported Melford Stevenson's evidence, the cheque written out for £1,000, went missing after the hearing, instigating a further police investigation. While the culprit was not found, Scotland Yard suspected the local Deputy Chief Constable of Eastbourne, Seekings, of having misplaced it to help Adams. Seekings was known to have taken holidays with Adams and Gwynne and looked after Gwynne's finances while he was in hospital in January 1957.

Following the committal hearing, the Attorney-General advised Devlin that he would not be using the evidence regarding the Hullets in the Morrell trial, but seeking a second indictment relating to Mrs. Hullett, which he did on 5 March 1957. Had this been proceeded with, a second committal hearing would have been required. The trial on the indictment relating to Mrs. Morrell started on 18 March 1957 at the Old Bailey, with that relating to Mrs. Hullett held back for a possible second separate trial. Three days later, a new Homicide Act came into effect; a single murder by poison became a non-capital offence. Adams, having been indicted on both charges before this date, would still face the death penalty if convicted. The Home Secretary would be less likely to grant clemency in the case of a second murder conviction in the Hullett case, as this would make it far more difficult politically to sentence Adams to life imprisonment, particularly as a double murder could still be capital under the 1957 Homicide Act, and Devlin considered that the Attorney-General's aim in bringing forward a second indictment was to make it more likely that Adams would hang.

== Trial ==
Adams was first tried for the murder of Morrell, with the Hullett charge to be prosecuted afterwards. The trial lasted 17 days, the longest murder trial in Britain up to that point. It was presided over by Mr. Justice Sir Patrick Devlin. Devlin summed up the tricky nature of the case thus: "It is a most curious situation, perhaps unique in these courts, that the act of murder has to be proved by expert evidence."

Hannam was apparently shocked by the choice to try Adams for the murder of Morrell first. Morrell had been dead for a few years, her body had been cremated, and she was 81 at the time of her death. The much more recent death of Hullett, who died aged 50 without suffering from any somatic illness and whose body had not been cremated (and contained twice the fatal dose of barbiturates) would have made a much more convincing case.

The prosecution relied on three main bases: the amounts of opiate drugs prescribed by Adams for Mrs. Morrell, Adams's verbal admission that he himself had injected almost all the amounts prescribed and statements taken from Mrs. Morrell's nurses in August and November 1956. The statements of nurses Stronach and Randall suggested that Adams had increased the frequency of injections and the amount of each injection throughout the period they had nursed Mrs. Morrell, and that many of the injections Adams gave were of drugs taken from his bag, which he had prepared himself rather than asking the nurses to prepare, and they were unaware of the contents of these injections. These two nurses repeated these allegations when questioned by Manningham-Buller, but under cross-examination, they were forced to admit that it was they and the other two nurses that usually made up the injections to be administered either by them or Adams and that they had recorded the relatively few injections already prepared by Adams and had also recorded their nature on at least some occasions. Another nurse recalled that these were said to be vitamin injections, and it was also clear that the amounts of opiates injected were constant until September 1950, when another doctor first increased the dosage.

The leading Defence counsel Sir Frederick Geoffrey Lawrence, QC, had been briefed by the Medical Defence Union with the additional task of obtaining a ruling on whether medical treatments that might shorten the life of a terminally ill patient were legal. Lawrence, a "specialist in real estate and divorce cases [and] a relative stranger in criminal court", who was defending his first murder trial, convinced the jury that there was no evidence that a murder had been committed, much less that a murder had been committed by Adams. He emphasised that the indictment was based mainly on testimonies from the nurses who tended to Mrs. Morrell and that there were discrepancies between the evidence given by different witnesses. Then, on the second day of the trial, he produced notebooks written by the nurses, detailing Adams's treatment of Morrell. The prosecution claimed not to have seen these notebooks: these differed from the nurses' recollection of events and showed that smaller quantities of drugs were given to the patient than the prosecution had thought, based on Adams's prescriptions.

Furthermore, the prosecution's two expert medical witnesses gave differing opinions: Arthur Douthwaite was prepared to say that murder had definitely been committed (though he changed his mind in the middle of his testimony regarding the exact date), but Michael Ashby was more reticent. (Note: When asked by Lawrence whether it was possible "to rule out the hypothesis that when the end came in that way at that time on that date, it was the result of natural causes?", Ashby replied "It cannot be ruled out".) The defence witness and physician John Harman was adamant that Adams's treatment, though unusual, was not reckless. Finally, the prosecution was wrong-footed by the defence not calling Adams to give evidence, thereby avoiding him "chatting himself to the gallows". This was unexpected, shocking the prosecution, causing a commotion among the press and even surprising the judge. Devlin commented that the defence must have known this would cause prejudice against Adams, but the danger that Adams would be loquacious, or not able to keep to the point, would likely aid the prosecution. In addition, anything he might say could, if he were convicted, be used in a subsequent prosecution of the Hullett case.

Towards the end of his closing speech for the defence, Lawrence put the case for Adams's innocence and the faulty basis of the prosecution case, saying:

Trying to ease the last hours of the dying is a doctor's duty and it had been twisted and turned into an accusation for murder.

Mr. Justice Devlin received a phone call from Lord Goddard, the Lord Chief Justice, at the time defence and prosecution were making their closing speeches. In the event of Adams being acquitted, Lord Goddard suggested that Devlin might consider an application to release Adams on bail before the Hullett trial, which was due to start afterwards. Devlin was at first surprised since a person accused of murder had never been given bail before in British legal history, but was willing to entertain the idea and, on consideration, saw its merit as showing strong judicial displeasure over the Attorney-General's plan to proceed with the second indictment. Goddard, as Lord Chief Justice, had responsibility for the conduct of all courts in England and Wales, from magistrates' courts to the Court of Appeal and was entitled to give Devlin his views on the case.

On 9 April 1957, the jury returned after 44 minutes to find Adams not guilty.

=== Use of the nolle prosequi ===
After the not-guilty verdict on the count of murdering Morrell, the normal process would have been to bring the indictment regarding Mrs Hullett to trial—either a full trial or, in view of the acquittal in Mrs Morrell's case, a speedy one—so that Adams would plead not guilty. After such a plea, the Attorney-General would offer no evidence and the judge would direct the jury to bring in a not guilty verdict, which was the course Devlin expected. However the Attorney-General, as a minister of the Crown, had the power to suspend an indictment through a nolle prosequi, something which Devlin said had never been used to prevent an accused from an acquittal, suggesting this was done because Manningham-Buller did not want a second acquittal and adverse verdicts in both the cases he had indicted. Nolle prosequi could legitimately be used in cases to protect a guilty person granted immunity to turn Queen's evidence or to save the lives of the innocent, or sometimes on compassionate grounds.

Devlin later referred to the Manningham-Buller action as "an abuse of process", saying: "The use of nolle prosequi to conceal the deficiencies of the prosecution was an abuse of process, which left an innocent man under the suspicion that there might have been something in the talk of mass murder after all".

Manningham-Buller later told Parliament after the Morrell trial that the publicity which attended the Morrell trial would make it difficult to secure a fair trial on the indictment relating to Mrs Hullett, and that the second case depended very greatly on inference, which was not supported by admissions, as in Mrs Morrell's case. This was a reference to Adams's admission that he had himself administered most of Mrs Morrell's opiate injections, whereas he had only said in his statements to the police that he had handed two barbiturate tablets to Mrs Hullett each day, and said nothing to link the total of barbiturates supplied to prescriptions he had issued.

== Claims of prejudice and political interference in the trial ==
Cullen claimed that there was considerable evidence to suggest that the trial was "interfered with" by those "at the highest level", although the available evidence amounts at best to suspicion. For example, during the committal hearing for Adams in January 1957, Lord Goddard, the Lord Chief Justice, was seen dining with Sir Roland Gwynne (Mayor of Eastbourne from 1929 to 1931) and the chairman of the local panel of magistrates, and ex-Attorney General Sir Hartley Shawcross, a member of the opposition, at a hotel in Lewes. As Lord Chief Justice, Goddard had responsibility for the conduct of all courts in England and Wales, from magistrates' courts to the Court of Appeal and the subject of their conversation is unreported and unknown.

The reasons for this supposed interference alleged by Cullen include concerns of the effect on the medical profession of a doctor being sentenced to death for prescribing certain medication in the course of treating patients at a time when doctors were already disaffected with the NHS. The case was "very important for the medical profession", as the Attorney-General, a government minister, had created the threat of a death sentence by indicting Adams for two murders, an unusual practice in 1957. Other reasons suggested, with no direct relationship to the medical profession, were the Suez Crisis, which caused Anthony Eden to resign in January 1957, to be replaced by Harold Macmillan's initially insecure government, and links to Harold Macmillan personally, through the death on 26 November 1950, over six years before the trial, of The 10th Duke of Devonshire, Harold Macmillan's brother-in-law, who had been treated by Adams at the time of his death. Cullen's supposition that the Attorney-General deliberately sabotaged a trial, which the available evidence showed he wanted to win, to please his political masters, or that Macmillan's family affairs had any bearing on the trial, are dismissed by a later researcher as "ludicrous" and completely unsupported by credible evidence.

There is also considerable evidence of negative and prejudicial press coverage of the case. From the start of the Eastbourne Police investigation, in addition to rumours picked up from local residents, journalists had been briefed by the local Chief Constable about the suspicious nature of Mrs. Hullett's death and possible links with other deaths. The Daily Mail in particular went so far as to link Bodkin Adams with what had become a murder investigation by stating that the police had interviewed him, and the Daily Mirror added that four other cases of Adams's were being investigated in connection with the Hullett's enquiry. Once the case had been passed to the Metropolitan Police, Percy Hoskins, who had resisted the general press condemnation of Adams, was contacted by an Assistant Commissioner of the Metropolitan Police on the basis that what had emerged from the Eastbourne investigation did not warrant the apparently concerted press campaign. Hoskins later exposed a police campaign to plant stories prejudicial to Adams in national newspapers, particularly the Daily Mail, whose reporter was briefed by Hannam personally. Hannam was asked by his police superiors in October 1956 to do what he could to deal with the gossip that had arisen and, at the time of Adams's arrest on 19 December 1956 (and aware of his superiors' criticisms of his relationship with the press), he attempted to distance himself from their activities.

== Discovery of the nurses' notebooks ==
On the second day of the trial, the defence introduced eight notebooks of the daily records made by nurses who had attended Mrs. Morrell under Adams's directions. These were not available to the prosecution when the trial started so Manningham-Buller had no chance to consider their contents before the defence began to use them in the cross-examination of the first nurse appearing for the prosecution. He was, however, presented with a copy of them by the defence later in the second day of the trial. These books were then used by the defence to counter the witness statements and evidence in chief given by the nurses who had originally written the notes. Comments in the nurses' witness statements which were prejudicial to Adams were disproved by reference to their contemporaneous notes. Six years after the event, the notes could be said to be more reliable than the nurses' own memories. However, Devlin noted the witness statements that supported Hannam's theories were taken by Hannam and his team, and that doing this accurately may have been beyond Hannam's powers.

The defence was not required to explain how the books came into their hands, and the Attorney-General neither made any effort to pursue this matter nor asked for an adjournment to acquaint himself with the new evidence, although Devlin later said that he would have been willing to grant it, had Manningham-Buller requested one. His reticence was perplexing since the Attorney-General was known for his doggedness. As Lord Devlin later said of him: "He could be downright rude but he did not shout or bluster. Yet his disagreeableness was so pervasive, his persistence so interminable, the obstructions he manned so far-flung, his objectives apparently so insignificant, that sooner or later you would be tempted to ask yourself whether the game was worth the candle. And if you asked yourself that, you were finished." Manningham-Buller did, however, claim in his closing speech that Adams may have influenced or corrupted the nurses to ensure they had not made entries that might incriminate him, an issue that Devlin noted had not been suggested to any of the nurses when they gave evidence.

Author Jane Robins was allowed access both to the archives of Herbert James, the friend and solicitor of Adams, and to Lord Devlin's private papers on the trial, which included Devlin's observation that James had found the notebooks after the police office that had conducted the search had failed to notice them. Herbert James' archives showed that he had found the nurses' notebooks in Adams's surgery on 24 November 1956, after the Eastbourne police had visited the surgery and carried out a search, after which they had taken Adams to Eastbourne police station for questioning. James' intention was to carry out his own search for anything that might either help or incriminate Adams and which had been missed by the police, and he found the notebooks.

Devlin criticised Hannam and his team for overlooking the nurses' notebooks, in a passage that confirms that he was aware of how the notebooks were found, adding that Adams had said his records for Mrs. Morrell were filed under "M" in his filing cabinet, but they had been moved later so that the police did not find them, whereas a more thorough search did. Cullen states that the notebooks were recorded in pre-trial police records but were not in the hands of the prosecution when the trial started, adding that Adams had given three conflicting explanations for how he came to have the notebooks in 1950, although he certainly had them in 1956. The first explanation was that they were given to him by Mrs. Morrell's son, who had found them among her effects, and Adams then filed them away at his surgery; next that they were delivered anonymously to his door after she died; or, finally, they were found in the air raid shelter at the back of his garden. Cullen noted that a claim that the notebooks were overlooked in the police search on 24 November 1956 but found by the defence team in Adams's surgery on the same evening was inconsistent with the list of exhibits for the Committal Hearing given by the police to the DPP's office, which mentioned the notebooks. She suggests that the Attorney General must therefore have known they existed, and, according to her, that this showed "that there was a will at the highest of levels to undermine the case against Dr. Adams." However, Devlin mentions that it was the responsibility of suitably qualified solicitors and barristers in the Director's office to prepare the brief from the police report, not the personal responsibility of the Attorney General, so basing such a serious claim of interference on discounting the only available account of their finding and a misunderstanding of the prosecution process shows its weakness.

== Suspicious cases ==
At an early stage in the investigation, Hannam believed he had found Adams's modus operandi: that he first made his victims drug addicts, then influenced them to change their wills in his favour and finally gave them a lethal dose of opiates. He concentrated on those cases where Adams had been left legacies or given gifts or had apparently stolen items from the deceased, even when the medical evidence was doubtful. Hannam confided to a reporter at this time that he was convinced that Adams was a serial killer who had killed fourteen people. Between August and October 1956, Hannam collected a significant number of witness statements, mainly from relatives of Adams's deceased former patients who claimed that these had been heavily drugged by Adams, were injected with unknown substances and had become comatose or unresponsive.

By mid-October 1956, Hannam had drafted his initial report for his Chief Superintendent. His interim report on his investigation of October 1956 includes his strong suspicions both of narcotic poisoning in several cases and of Adams inducing patients to make or change their wills in his favour. What Hannam considered were a significant number of suspiciously sinister events were bolstered, in his report by statements made by Adams about Mrs. Hullett's death that Hannam regarded as incriminating. Hannam's Chief Superintendent was initially dismissive of the case he had presented, considering it was speculative, based on rumour and could not be proved; the Commander of 'C' Division agreed, and the Director of Public Prosecutions asked Hannam to obtain more evidence. In January 1957, Hannam obtained further statements from Nurse Stronach and Nurse Randal, later prosecution witnesses in the Morrell case, which were more specific and more damaging to Adams. The nurses claimed in particular that they were generally unaware of what he was injecting. The statements gathered both before and after Hannam's initial report have often been quoted in support of Adams's guilt, but in the Morrell case, the nurses' own notebooks showed that the testimony in their statements was at best misremembered, at worst untrue.

The police focused on cases after 1946, and statements were taken under oath in only four cases (Mrs. Morrell, Mr. and Mrs. Hullet, and one dealing solely with offences relating to prescriptions, cremation forms, and dangerous drugs register). In other cases, Hannam had taken verbal statements, although Devlin doubted his ability to take statements that could be used in evidence without revision.

=== Principal cases ===
Cullen mentions Mrs. Morrell, Mr. and Mrs. Hullett, Clara Neil Miller and Julia Bradnum as cases that Hannam regarded as warranting prosecution. Details about Mrs. Morrell and Mrs. Hullett are given above: the case of Mr. Hullett and the two cases where police suspicions led to exhumations indicate that there was insufficient evidence of the cause of death to warrant a prosecution.

- 11 May 1952 – Julia Bradnum died aged 85. The previous year Adams asked her if her will was in order and offered to accompany her to the bank to check it. On examining it, he pointed out that she had not stated her beneficiaries' addresses and that it should be rewritten. She had wanted to leave her house to her adopted daughter but Adams suggested it would be better to sell the house and then give money to whomever she wanted. This she did. Adams eventually received £661. While Adams attended to this patient, he was often seen holding her hand and chatting to her on one knee.
  - The day before Bradnum died, she had been doing housework and going for walks. The next morning she woke up feeling unwell. Adams was called and saw her. He gave her an injection and stated "It will be over in three minutes". It was. Adams then confirmed "I'm afraid she's gone" and left the room.
  - Bradnum was exhumed on 21 December 1956. Adams had said on the death certificate that Bradnum died of a cerebral haemorrhage, but Francis Camps examined her remains and was unable to find evidence either to prove or disprove this, stating that, because of the advanced degree of decomposition of the corpse, the brain was not in a condition to be assessed. Had the final injection given to Mrs. Bradnum been morphine, heroin or barbiturates, this might have been apparent from the liver, but Camps did not order toxicology tests, considering he could not be sure of the state of the internal organs what comprised the remains of the liver.
- 22 February 1954 – Clara Neil Miller, died aged 87. Adams often locked the door when he saw her – for up to twenty minutes at a time. A witness, Dolly Wallis, asked Clara about this, and she said he was assisting her in "personal matters": pinning on brooches, adjusting her dress. His fat hands were "comforting" to her. Wallis also claimed that Clara appeared to be under the influence of drugs.
  - Early that February, the coldest for many years, Adams had sat with her in her room for forty minutes. A nurse entered, unnoticed, and saw Clara's "bed clothes all off... and over the foot rail of the bed, her night gown up around her chest and the window in the room open top and bottom", while Adams read to her from the Bible. When later confronted by Hannam regarding this, Adams said "The person who told you that doesn't know why I did it".
  - Clara left Adams £1,275, and he charged her estate a further £700 after her death in addition to a £500 cheque he got from her earlier. He was the sole executor. Her funeral was arranged by Adams and only he and Annie Sharpe, the owner of the guest house, were present. Annie Sharpe received £200 in Clara's will. Adams tipped the vicar a guinea after the ceremony. Clara Neil Miller was one of the two bodies exhumed during the police investigation on 21 December 1956. Despite the poor condition of the corpse, Francis Camps found evidence of coronary thrombosis and bronchopneumonia. Small amounts of morphine and barbiturates were also found, but not in sufficient quantities to draw any conclusions. According to prescription records, Adams had not prescribed anything to treat the bronchopneumonia.
- 14 March 1956 – Alfred John Hullett died, aged 71. He was the husband of Gertrude Hullett. Sometime in the 1940s, Adams falsely told Alfred Hullett that he (Hullett) needed an urgent operation; Hullett consulted another doctor and Adams's claim was revealed to be absolutely wrong. Still, Adams remained Hullett's friend. In November 1955, Adams diagnosed Hullett with cancer in his abdomen (the same diagnosis as Annie Sharpe). A doctor called in from London attempted an operation during which "something went wrong". Ten days later, Alfred's "whole abdomen burst"; Adams, and his partner in practice, operated immediately and "repaired the burst" (in Adams's words). Since then, Adams was giving Hullett large doses of morphine. "I am too full of dope to say anything sensible", Hullett said to one of his friends. Hullett started exhibiting heart problems, and in March 1956, a heart specialist opined that Hullett had been suffering from "some type of heart trouble" since childhood and that the condition was now worsening. The specialist expected that Hullett would die within a few months and might die at any time; on 13 March, he had severe chest pains consistent with a heart attack. He died the next morning of what Adams described as cerebral haemorrhage.
  - Shortly after his death, Adams went to a chemist's to get a 10 cc hypodermic morphine solution containing 5 grains in Mr. Hullett's name, and for the prescription to be back-dated to the previous day. The police presumed this was to cover morphine Adams had given him from his own private supplies. Mr. Hullett left Adams £500 in his will. In cross-examination during Adams's committal hearing, the defence forced an admission from the Crown's expert witness that Mr. Hullett died of a coronary thrombosis.

=== Death of Annie Sharpe ===
Annie Sharpe was the proprietor of 'Barton', a boarding house where at least two of Adams's victims, the Neil Miller sisters (Hilda, died 1953; and Clara, died 1954) had lived; Adams had cut both of them off from their relatives and prevented them from receiving their mail. Sharpe herself tried to get the Neil Miller sisters to "invest £5,000 in her business"; she admitted only to receiving a £200 cheque from Clara Neil Miller. She and Adams were the only people present during Clara Neil Miller's burial.

After interviewing Sharpe, Hannam considered her a key witness and thought she was the key to the whole matter, suspecting she was money-grabbing and in collusion with Adams.

While the investigation was underway, Sharpe was suddenly "diagnosed" by Adams with cancer in her abdominal cavity and died a few days after this diagnosis, on 13 or 15 November 1956. Her body was cremated.

== After the acquittal ==
In the aftermath of the trial, Adams resigned from the National Health Service and was convicted in Lewes Crown Court on 26 July 1957, on eight counts of forging prescriptions, four counts of making false statements on cremation forms, and three offences under the Dangerous Drugs Act 1951, and fined £2,400 plus costs of £457. His licence to prescribe dangerous drugs was revoked on 4 September and on 27 November he was struck off the Medical Register by the GMC. Adams continued to see some of his more loyal patients, and prescribed over-the-counter medicine to them.

Immediately following the trial, Percy Hoskins, the chief crime reporter for the Daily Express, whisked Adams off to a safe house in Westgate-on-Sea near Margate in Kent, where Adams spent the next two weeks recounting his life story. Hoskins had befriended Adams during the trial and was the only major journalist to act on the presumption of his innocence. Adams was paid £10,000 (£209,400 today) for the interview, though he never spent the proceeds. The notes were found untouched in a bank vault after his death. Adams then successfully sued several newspapers for libel. Adams returned to Eastbourne, where he continued to practise privately, despite the widespread belief in the town that he had murdered people. That belief was not shared by his friends and his patients in general. One exception was Sir Roland Gwynne, who distanced himself from Adams after the trial.

After two failed applications, Adams was reinstated as a general practitioner on 22 November 1961, and his authority to prescribe dangerous drugs was restored the following July. He continued to practise as a sole practitioner, not resuming his partnership with the town's "Red House" practice. In August 1962, Adams applied for a visa to the United States but was refused because of his dangerous drug convictions.

Adams later became president (and honorary medical officer) of the British Clay Pigeon Shooting Association.

Sir Roland Gwynne died on 15 November 1971. Adams signed his death certificate.

== Death ==
Adams slipped and fractured his hip on 30 June 1983 while shooting in Battle, East Sussex. He was taken to Eastbourne Hospital but developed a chest infection and died on 4 July of left ventricular failure. He left an estate of £402,970 (equivalent to £1,370,105 in 2025) and bequeathed £1,000 to Percy Hoskins. Adams is buried in a family grave in Coleraine cemetery in Coleraine Northern Ireland.

== Historical views on Adams ==
=== Before 2003 ===
Opinion regarding Adams has been divided, though in recent years has tended to the view that he was a murderer. The writer Sybille Bedford, present at Adams's trial, was adamant that he was not guilty. (Note: "Whenever the name of Dr John Bodkin Adams comes up, I am asked, 'Did he do it?' 'Was he guilty?' And I always answer, 'No'".) Many publications were sued for libel during Adams's lifetime, showing the prevalence of the rumours that surrounded him.

After Adams's death, writers were more free to speculate. In 1983, Rodney Hallworth and Mark Williams concluded Adams was a serial killer and probably schizophrenic: "In the opinion of many experts Adams died an unconvicted mass-murderer". Percy Hoskins, writing in 1984, was of the opposite opinion, adamant that Adams was not guilty but merely "naive" and "avaricious". In 1985, Sir Patrick Devlin, the judge, stated that Adams may have been a "mercenary mercy killer" but, though compassionate, he was at the same time greedy and "prepared to sell death": "He did not think of himself as a murderer but a dispenser of death [...] According to his lights, he had done nothing wrong. There was nothing wrong in a doctor getting a legacy, nor in his bestowing in return [...] a death as happy as heroin could make it." He also "could be convinced that Dr. Adams had helped to end Mrs. Hullett's life". In 2000, Surtees, a former colleague of Adams, wrote a more sympathetic account of him as being the victim of a police vendetta.

In 1986, The Good Doctor Bodkin Adams, a television docudrama based on his trial, was produced with Timothy West in the lead.

=== After 2003 ===
These writers, other than Devlin, who read and based his account on the papers from the committal proceedings and the case papers for the Hullett case before it was discontinued, based their opinions almost entirely on the evidence given in court regarding Morrell. (Note: Though Hoskins and Hallworth did visit Eastbourne in 1956 and talked to local residents and the police. Surtees interviewed many local residents and Adams himself, though decades after the events.) The police archives were opened in 2003 at the request of Pamela Cullen, who speculates that Adams was acquitted more due to the way the case "was presented than [to] Doctor Adams' lack of guilt". She also highlights the fact that Hannam's investigation was "blinkered" from the perspective of motive: Hannam assumed monetary gain was the driving force because during the 1950s, little was known of what really motivated serial killers, i.e. "physical needs, emotions and often bizarre interpretations of reality".

The apparently incompatible accounts of Adams as a barely competent doctor lavish in his use of heroin and morphia with his successful and lucrative medical practice may be explained by the medical profession's attitude to end-of-life care in the period. Between the 1930s and 1960s, the medical profession, in general, regarded death as a failure and subjected dying patients to treatments aimed at prolonging life rather than relieving suffering, an attitude prevalent in the post-war National Health Service, which failed to make adequate provision for the dying. Increasingly, patients feared suffering before death and, although a few doctors were prepared to advocate the use of opiates in palliative care openly, published medical commentary on care of the dying was rare before the 1960s. However, a 1948 article observed that "purely medical treatment" for the dying could "almost be written in one word—morphine", and a 1957 British Medical Association meeting heard the use of heroin to induce euphoria, oblivion, and relieve pain. Although doctors were aware that hastening a patient's death was illegal, one suggested in 1944 it was something "the law forbids in theory but ignores in practice": he added it was something only the doctor could judge, and it should not be discussed with patients, their families, or medical colleagues.

In Adams's case, the court did not ignore the suggestion that he had hastened death. As Devlin makes clear, he needed to clarify for the jury, and incidentally the medical profession, the extent to which the law allowed the orthodox doctor to go in easing the passing of the dying. Mahar regards Adams' statements to Hannam on Mrs. Morrell as less about his guilt or innocence than a disconnection between the medical and legal views on assisted dying: Adams never denied giving his patients large doses of opiates, but denied it was murder. This was not simply Adams's idiosyncratic view, as appears from the evidence of Dr. Douthwaite for the prosecution, who accepted that a physician might knowingly give fatal doses of pain-relieving drugs to terminally ill patients, adding it was not his business to say whether it was murder. Devlin's directions to the jury confirmed that it was a medical issue, not a legal or moral one, whether Adams's treatment was designed to promote comfort. Devlin's view was that Adams may have been guilty of mercy killing or even perhaps finishing off a troublesome patient, but was one who cared for his patients to the best of his ability. Adams eased the passing of Mrs. Morrell, but his greed brought his motives into question. Mahar notes that an editorial in a medical journal following the case suggested that the publicity it caused might hamper medical discretion, but claimed the use of opiates in terminal cases was essential. Adams may be seen as an extreme case in their use, but other doctors also used them to ease the passing.

== Legal legacy ==
Adams's trial has had many effects on the English legal system.

- The first was establishing the principle of double effect that if a doctor "gave treatment to a seriously ill patient with the aim of relieving pain or distress, as a result of which that person's life was inadvertently shortened, the doctor was not guilty of murder." (Note: The summing up affirmed "that a doctor will be immune from criminal liability if his or her primary intention in these circumstances can be characterised as an intention to relieve pain, rather than an intention to hasten death.")
- Owing to the potentially prejudicial evidence that was mentioned in the committal hearing (regarding Mrs Hullett, evidence that was not subsequently used in Adams's trial for murdering Mrs Morrell), the Tucker Committee was held, which led to the law being changed in the subsequent Criminal Justice Act 1967 to restrict what might be published about committal hearings to avoid pre-trial publicity.
- Though a defendant had never been required to give evidence in his defence, Mr Justice Devlin underlined in his summing-up that no prejudice should be attached by the jury to Adams not doing so.
- The case also led to changes in Dangerous Drugs Regulations, meaning that Schedule IV poisons required a signed and dated record of patient details and the total dose used. Previously, the record need only have recorded such drugs obtained.

It has been suggested by a number of professionals in biomedical law that Devlin's proposition that a doctor whose primary intention is to relieve pain, even if life is incidentally shortened, provides a special defence in law for doctors only, and may be an example of the reluctance of courts to convict doctors. Although it is frequently asserted by, for example, the British Medical Association, that UK law does not distinguish between doctors and non-doctors, the way that intention to kill is interpreted in medical cases shows that the law treats the bona fide exercise of a doctor's clinical judgment as precluding a guilty mind.

=== Subsequent cases ===
It was 25 years before another doctor in Britain, Leonard Arthur, stood trial for murder arising from treatment. Arthur was tried in November 1981 at Leicester Crown Court for the attempted murder of John Pearson, a newborn child with Down syndrome. Like Adams, on the advice of his legal team, he did not give evidence in his defence, relying instead on expert witnesses. He was acquitted.

More recently, the double effect principle figured in two British murder trials. In 1990, Nigel Leigh Cox, a rheumatologist, was convicted of the attempted murder of a terminally ill patient who had begged him to kill her. Once painkillers had proved ineffective, he injected her with twice the lethal dose of potassium chloride and she died within minutes. Cox's claim that his intention was to relieve suffering was not accepted, as potassium chloride had no analgesic properties. In the same year, Thomas Lodwig gave a terminal cancer patient an injection of lignocaine and potassium chloride which proved rapidly fatal. However, as lignocaine is a pain-killer, his claim that potassium chloride could accelerate the analgesic effect of recognised painkillers was not disputed by the prosecution. Although Lodwig was charged with murder, the prosecution offered no evidence at his trial.

In 2000, Harold Shipman became the only British doctor to be successfully prosecuted for the murder of his patients. He was found guilty on 15 counts and the Shipman Inquiry concluded in 2002 that he had probably murdered as many as 250 people.

== See also ==
- Gosport War Memorial Hospital 1990s opioid deaths scandal
- Colin Norris – British serial killer nurse convicted of murdering his patients with overdoses in 2008
- Jessie McTavish – British nurse convicted and then controversially cleared of murdering a patient with insulin
- Beverley Allitt
- John George Haigh
- Arnfinn Nesset
- Dorothea Waddingham
- Lucy Letby
- Most prolific murderers by number of victims

== Sources ==
- Bedford, Sybille (1958). The Best We Can Do. London: Penguin. ISBN 0-14-011557-9.
- British Medical Association (1948). "Legal proceedings". British Medical Journal: Supplement. 2264 (1).
- Cullen, Pamela V. (2006). A Stranger in Blood: The Case Files on Dr John Bodkin Adams. London: Elliott & Thompson. ISBN 1-904027-19-9.
- Devlin, Patrick (1985). Easing the passing: The trial of Doctor John Bodkin Adams. London: The Bodley Head. ISBN 0-571-13993-0.
- Furneaux, Rupert (1957). Famous Criminal Cases (4). London: Allan Wingate.
- Hoskins, Percy (1984). Two men were acquitted: The trial and acquittal of Doctor John Bodkin Adams. London: Secker & Warburg. ISBN 0-436-20161-5.
- Hallworth, Rodney; Williams, Mark (1983). Where there's a will... The sensational life of Dr John Bodkin Adams. Jersey: Capstan Press. ISBN 0-946797-00-5.
- Jones, Elwyn (April 1969). "The Office of Attorney-General". The Cambridge Law Journal. 27 (1): 43–53. doi:10.1017/S0008197300088899. JSTOR 4505281. S2CID 145400357.
- Mahar, Caitlin. (2012). "Easing the Passing: R v Adams and Terminal Care in Post-war Britain". Social History of Medicine. 28 (1).
- Otlowski, Margaret (2004). Voluntary Euthanasia and the Common Law. Oxford University Press. ISBN 0-19829-868-4.
- Pearson, Geoffrey. (1999). "Drug-Control Policies in Britain". Crime and Justice. 14.
- Robins, Jane (2013). The Curious Habits of Dr Adams: A 1950s Murder Mystery. John Murray. ISBN 978-1-84854-470-3.
- Surtees, John (2000). The Strange Case of Dr. Bodkin Adams: The Life and Murder Trial of Eastbourne's Infamous Doctor and the Views of Those Who Knew Him. Seaford. ISBN 1-85770-108-9.
- Williams, Glenys (2007). Intention and Causation in Medical Non-Killing: The impact of criminal law concepts on euthanasia and assisted suicide. Routledge-Cavendish.
- Kirby, Dick (2020). Scotland Yard's Murder Squad. Pen and Sword True Crime.
