= Howard Martin =

British doctor

- Born: 1934
- Died: 2024 (aged 89–90); County Durham
- Years active: 1957–2010
- Medical career
- Profession: Physician

Howard Martin (1934–2024) was a former British army doctor and GP who was prosecuted for the murder of three patients in 2005 but acquitted. In June 2010, after being struck off the medical register by the General Medical Council for hastening the deaths of 18 patients, he admitted in a newspaper interview bringing forward the deaths of two patients, including his terminally ill son. Martin died in County Durham in April 2024 after a short illness.

== Career ==
Martin qualified in 1957 and went on to work as a doctor in the British army for 18 years before he became a general practitioner in 1977 and worked in Newton Aycliffe, England. In 2004 the police opened an investigation into his activities after relatives voiced concern regarding the manner of patients' deaths.

== Trial ==
In 2005 Martin was prosecuted for the deaths of three patients: Harry Gittins, 74, Stanley Weldon, 74, and Frank Moss, 59, all from County Durham. The trial lasted six weeks. Weldon had his life shortened by "two hours" according to the prosecution when Martin gave him a terminal dose of painkillers. Police put down the failure to convict to the fact that Martin chose to remain silent during the proceedings meaning cross-examination was impossible.

In 2007 an inquest was also held into the death of William Kerr, 84. His remains had been exhumed as part of the 2004 investigation into Martin. An open verdict was reached due to the advanced state of the body's decomposition.

On 18 June 2010 a General Medical Council hearing struck Martin off the medical register for hastening the deaths of 18 patients in what the hearing described as "despicable and dangerous" conduct. Panel chairman Brian Gomes da Costa also said that "Dr Martin's actions were indicative of an autocratic attitude, in that he seemed always to consider that he was right; and rejected, or did not seek, the views of others. He repeatedly broke the trust to which patients are entitled; this is unjustifiable."

== Telegraph interviews ==
In 2010 Martin gave a series of interviews to Daily Telegraph newspaper about his treatment of patients. In these interviews, he claimed there had been a prosecution "vendetta" against him and that all he had done was try to ease the pain of his patients. He admitted shortening the life of some patients, often without their express permission, but denied committing murder. He also admitted helping his terminally ill son to die. The Crown Prosecution Service stated that it would look into his statements to see if a new prosecution was warranted. Martin told the Daily Telegraph, "They can come after me if they like. But I’m nearly 76 now and will be 77 or 78 by the time anything happens. I am an old man. Whatever they try to do to me, my conscience is still clear."

In the interviews, Martin rejected any similarity to the case of Harold Shipman, and listed the differences between them:

- "Shipman was a psychopath acting on his own needs [...] I believe I’m a normal, caring practitioner."
- "Dr Shipman used opiate drugs for himself. I am drugs free."
- "He killed for his own power and satisfaction and pleasure. I merely kept patients asleep when they were in dire circumstances."
- "Dr Shipman chose patients who were not terminal. I only treated patients who were imminently dying."
- "Dr Shipman got heroin illegally by fraud. I did everything above board and on prescription."
- "We have to buy the drugs privately and submit a bill to the Government. I want to lead my life righteously and truthfully."
- "Dr Shipman took material advantage from his dead patients. I never took any advantage."
- "Relatives were not present when he gave the injections. In my case the patient’s family were always informed and were usually present."
- "Dr Shipman didn’t discuss his management with the patients. I always did."
- "Dr Shipman chose which patients he would deal with. My patients always called for help in the normal fashion."
- "Dr Shipman’s motives were psychopathic. My motive was to secure lack of suffering and some dignity for patients by keeping them asleep."

In February 2011 the CPS decided not to prosecute Martin for the deaths.

== Beliefs ==
Martin has claimed that he was not an advocate of euthanasia, instead being concerned with patients' dignity in death. He said in June 2010, "It’s not playing God to tend to people’s need with compassion and to let them have dignity."
