= Leonard Arthur =

British physician tried for attempted murder

Leonard Arthur FRCP
- Born: Leonard John Henry Arthur; 20 April 1926
- Died: 25 December 1983 (aged 57)
- Education: MB, BChir
- Occupations: Doctor, Paediatrician
- Known for: R v Arthur case, ethical views on treating severely disabled newborns
- Relatives: John Langdon Down (great-grandfather-in-law)
- Medical career
- Profession: Physician
- Field: Paediatrics
- Institutions: Middlesex Hospital, Durham Light Infantry (National Service), Hospitals in Birmingham, London, Newcastle, Plymouth, University College Hospital, Ibadan, Bristol hospitals, Derby hospitals
- Sub-specialties: Paediatrics

Leonard John Henry Arthur (20 April 1926 – 25 December 1983) was a British doctor tried in the 1981 case of R v Arthur, for the attempted murder of John Pearson, a newborn child with Down's syndrome. He was acquitted.

An important test case, the trial brought to public attention the dilemmas for doctors in treating severely disabled newborn infants. Arthur felt strongly that doctors should always act in the best interests of the child, with the full support of the parents. In some cases, this meant not prolonging the child's life in order to prevent future suffering. Opinion polls taken at the time of the trial indicated huge public support for Arthur's approach. The outcome of the trial confirmed that 'nursing care only' is an acceptable form of treatment, and that administering a drug to relieve suffering is not an offence, even if it accelerates death. Ambiguities remain, however, about what is legally permissible in the treatment of disabled infants: if a doctor or anyone else intentionally kills a child, however disadvantaged, this would still be considered to be murder.

== Family ==
A descendant of Sir George Arthur, Arthur's father was a parish priest. In 1954, Arthur married Janet Stella Brain, daughter of Walter Russell Brain, a former president of the Royal College of Physicians made a baronet in 1954. Together they had one son and five daughters.

There are coincidences in Leonard Arthur's family that relate to Down syndrome. Arthur's mother-in-law, Janet Brain's mother, was Stella Langdon Down, the granddaughter of John Langdon Down who gave the first systematic description of Down syndrome in 1867 and after whom the syndrome is named. Stella had a brother, John, who had Down syndrome. He was named after his grandfather John Langdon Down, although he was born after his grandfather's death.

== Career ==
After attending Aldenham School in Elstree, Hertfordshire, Arthur studied medicine at Magdalene College, Cambridge, receiving an MB and BChir at Cambridge University before going on to qualify as a physician at Middlesex Hospital. He did National Service on the front line in Korea, as a medical officer in support of the Durham Light Infantry. Post-registration posts followed in Birmingham, London, Newcastle, and Plymouth, and he obtained the MRCP in 1957. He worked as a senior paediatric registrar in Ibadan, Nigeria, and then in Bristol.

In 1965, he became a consultant paediatrician in Derby. He served on the Council of the British Paediatric Association, was secretary of the Paediatric Section of the Royal Society of Medicine and chaired the Trent Regional Advisory Sub-committee in Paediatrics, sitting also on the Regional Medical Committee. He also chaired a Derbyshire County Council Advisory Committee on children at risk of non-accidental injury. He was elected FRCP shortly before he died, aged 57, on 25 December 1983.

Arthur was described by a colleague as a "a kind, gentle, compassionate man who cared deeply for his patients and their families. A great supporter of the weak or poor, he was motivated by firm Christian beliefs". When he was suspended from work after his first court appearance, a petition with some 19,000 signatures, including three Derbyshire MPs, called for his reinstatement. A former patient wrote in 2001: "He was the very best doctor around. I know. I was one of his patients. And after all these years I still miss him."

== John Pearson ==
John Pearson was born on 28 June 1980. He had Down syndrome and was later found to have had additional abnormalities of his lung, heart, and brain. Shortly after the birth, Arthur talked to John Pearson's parents and then wrote in the case notes, "Parents do not wish the baby to survive. Nursing care only." He prescribed DF118 (an opiate based painkiller), to be given 'as required' in doses of 5 mg at four hourly intervals. The child died three days later, on 1 July 1980, the cause of death being identified as bronchopneumonia as a result of Down syndrome.

Arthur was subsequently charged with murder, but the possibility that the child's death was caused by his other defects caused the original charge to be reduced, during the trial, to attempted murder.

== Trial ==
Sir Thomas Hetherington, Director of Public Prosecutions, described the decision to prosecute Arthur as the "most difficult" of his career. Arthur was tried on 5 November 1981 in Leicester Crown Court and defended by George Carman. Arthur did not give evidence in his own trial. His defence did call other distinguished expert witnesses though, such as Sir Douglas Black, then President of the Royal College of Physicians, who said:

I say that it is ethical, in the case of a child suffering from Down's, and with a parental wish that it should not survive, to terminate life providing other considerations are taken into account such as the status and ability of the parents to cope in a way that the child could otherwise have had a happy life.

Carman argued in his closing remarks:

He could, like Pontius Pilate, have washed his hands of the matter. He did not, because good doctors do not turn away. Are we to condemn him as a criminal because he helped two people [the mother and child] at the time of their greatest need? Are we to condemn a doctor because he cared?

The jury deliberated for two hours and found Arthur not guilty.

During the trial the Daily Mail newspaper published an opinion article about euthanasia by Malcolm Muggeridge, and was tried for contempt of court. Although the Mail was aware the trial was taking place, their defence was that the article was a discussion of public affairs under section 5 of the newly enacted Contempt of Court Act 1981. The House of Lords held that the article did create a substantial risk of serious prejudice to the trial but, as it was written in good faith to support a pro-life by-election candidate, and made no mention of the Arthur case, the risk of prejudice was merely incidental.

== Legal legacy ==
The case established that it was acceptable practice to prescribe 'nursing care only'. It also confirmed the principle that "the administration of a drug by a doctor when it is necessary to relieve pain is a proper medical practice even when the doctor knows that the drugs will themselves cause the patient's death".

== Criticism ==
MJ Gunn and JC Smith are critical of the judge's summing up. Arthur had admitted to the police that the effect of the drug given, apart from being a sedative, was also to stop the child seeking sustenance and that this had been intended by him. A witness, Professor Campbell, concurred that this was a justifiable practice. The judge made no mention of this potential homicidal intent during the summing up however, something which has been criticised, amongst others, by Gerald Wright, QC.

== See also ==
- David Moor – British doctor acquitted in 1999 of murdering a terminally ill patient. Moor admitted in a press interview to having killed 300 patients over 30 years
