= John B. Harman =

British physician

John Bishop Harman, FRCS, FRCP (10 August 1907 – 13 November 1994) was a British physician, president of the Medical Defence Union and chairman of the British National Formulary. He was also notable as a medical expert witness for the defence in the trial of suspected serial killer John Bodkin Adams. His daughter, Harriet Harman, is a senior Labour Party politician.

== Early life ==
Harman was born at 108 Harley Street, the heart of medical London, and practised and lived there his whole life. His father, Nathaniel Harman, trained as a Baptist minister but having gained a double first at Cambridge instead became an ophthalmic consultant. His mother was Katherine Chamberlain, a niece of Liberal politician Joseph Chamberlain, and thus cousin to Conservative Party Foreign Secretary Austen Chamberlain and Conservative Party Prime Minister Neville Chamberlain. Katherine also qualified as a doctor but devoted herself to her family instead of practising. Both his parents were committed Unitarians, his mother by birth and his father by conversion before marriage; his mother gave a substantial sum of money towards the reconstruction of the headquarters building known as Essex Hall. His eldest sibling grew up to be a historian and writer, best known under her married name as Elizabeth Pakenham, Countess of Longford.

Harman went to Oundle School, where he was very left-wing. According to a classmate, Sir Cyril Clarke, he later "became a staunch conservative, although he was nearly always anti-establishment simply for the fun of it." According to his daughter, Harriet, he was an "old-fashioned One Nation Tory". He went to St John's College, Cambridge, and then studied at St Thomas's Hospital Medical School.

== Career ==
Harman stayed on at St Thomas's and became a consultant in 1938. He served in the RAMC during the Second World War. Later he edited St Thomas's Pharmacopoeia reference book.

In 1971, Harman took over the chairmanship of the British National Formulary and between 1975 and 1978 was instrumental in persuading the Department of Health and Social Security to make it the National Health Service's medicine handbook at a time when its existence was under threat.

Harman retired in 1972 and took on the presidency of the Medical Defence Union.

== Adams trial ==
Doctor John Bodkin Adams was tried in 1957 for the murder of an 81-year-old patient, Edith Alice Morrell. Harman was called as the defence's main expert witness. He gave evidence that though the deceased was being prescribed high amounts of heroin and morphine by her general practitioner, it was entirely justified under the circumstances and that it would have done more harm to the patient if the treatment was discontinued. During cross-examination, however, it was established: that Harman had himself only ever worked as a general practitioner for a total of two weeks. He had only ever treated a handful of drug addicts – before the war. He had never seen 'spasms' caused by drug addiction, despite acting them out for the court in detail – he had only ever read about them. And furthermore, despite being a witness for the defence, he claimed he had at no time talked to Adams about his treatment of the patient.

Adams was acquitted, and a second count of the murder of another patient, Gertrude Hullett, was controversially withdrawn. The prosecutor Attorney-General, Sir Reginald Manningham-Buller, entered a nolle prosequi which the presiding judge, Patrick Devlin, later termed "an abuse of process".

Adams was subsequently successfully prosecuted on 13 lesser charges of prescription fraud, lying on cremation forms, obstructing a police search and failing to keep a dangerous drugs register. He was removed from the Medical Register in 1957 and reinstated in 1961. Home Office pathologist Francis Camps, however, suspected Adams of causing the deaths of 163 patients in total.

== Death ==
Harman died from a dissecting aortic aneurysm, while driving his car to St Thomas's in 1994, aged 87.

== Family ==
His sister, Elizabeth (wife of Lord Longford), introduced him to a barrister, Anna Spicer. They married in 1946 and had four daughters - Janet, Sarah, Harriet, Virginia - who all became solicitors. Harriet became Deputy Leader of the Labour Party and served in the Cabinet under Tony Blair and Gordon Brown.
