= Arthur Henry Douthwaite =

British medical doctor and medical textbook writer

Arthur Henry Douthwaite (13 February 1896 – 24 September 1974) was a British medical doctor, Vice President of the Royal College of Physicians and a prolific medical textbook writer. He was described as the foremost expert on heroin in Britain in the 1950s, or as a leading authority on opiates and he was called as an expert witness for the prosecution in the trial of Dr John Bodkin Adams for the murder of Mrs Edith Morrell.

== Career ==
Douthwaite was a senior physician at Guy's Hospital, and an Honorary Physician at All Saints' Hospital for Genito-urinary Diseases.

Douthwaite was Britain's foremost expert on dangerous drugs, and was instrumental in dissuading the Home Office from banning heroin for medical use.

Dr Douthwaite was greatly respected for his diagnostic skills. One story told of how he had walked into the casualty department in his usual morning dress and greeted the casualty officer, "I am Arthur Henry Douthwaite and I have just perforated my duodenal ulcer, please arrange my admission." According to the story, he had.

== Bodkin Adams trial ==
In 1957 Douthwaite gave evidence as an expert witness at the trial of Dr John Bodkin Adams for murder. The basis for this trial was described at the time by the trial judge, Mr Justice Devlin as: "It is a most curious situation, perhaps unique in these courts, that the act of murder has to be proved by expert evidence". Douthwaite had been a member of the prosecution team since December 1957 when, together with the pathologist Dr Francis Camps, he had assured the Attorney General, Melford Stevenson and the Director of Public Prosecutions that the amounts of opiates prescribed for Mrs Morrell were fatal beyond doubt, and he also gave evidence to this effect in the Committal hearing. Devlin commented that, having assured the prosecution of the soundness of his opinion, he was determined to stand by it in the trial.

Adams had been arrested the previous year for the murder of two widows, Gertrude Hullett and Edith Alice Morrell. He was tried for the murder of the latter and the prosecution, led by Sir Reginald Manningham-Buller, alleged that he had killed her with excessive doses of heroin and morphine. Douthwaite and Michael Ashby were the prosecution's key expert witnesses. However, while Ashby was hesitant as to whether Adams had definitely intended to kill Mrs Morrell, Douthwaite was adamant that there was no doubt that Adams had intended her death. At times Douthwaite's testimony seemed overconfident and even arrogant, and it only succeeded in alienating the jury and the judge.

At the start of his cross-examination, Douthwaite accepted the gravity of the murder charge against Adams, but claimed that he could think of "no legitimate reason" for Adams' to prescribe opiates, and could only surmise that it suggested "a desire to terminate life". He admitted later in that cross-examination that his evidence at the committal hearing was given without knowledge of Mrs Morrell's treatment in the first 18 months after her stroke, only that in the last 10 months before her death, and was based the assumption, later shown to incorrect, that she had been in a coma for the last three or four days of her life. Leading defence counsel, Frederick Geoffrey Lawrence also secured an admission from Dr Douthwaite that, in his examination-in-chief, his evidence on possible withdrawal symptoms was in response to instances selected by the Attorney-General that might not have been representative. When questioned as to whether this procedure was fair or not, Douthwaite argued that it was up to the defence to question him on that point and not his duty to comment on fairness. Douthwaite also accepted that it was essential to his theory of an intentional killing that Adams knew that opiates would accumulate in the body of an elderly immobile patient.

Douthwaite was also criticised by Lawrence for what seemed to be a change in his hypothesis half-way through the trial, when he selected a different date for when Adams had begun his attempt to kill Morrell. Lawrence put it to him thus:

"The truth of all this matter is this, Dr Douthwaite, that you first of all gave evidence on one basis to support a charge of murder and then thought of something else after you had started?"

Douthwaite replied:

"That is quite likely. In fact, I think it is probable. I had been turning it over in my mind but at what time it crystallised and became clear I do not know."

The historian Pamela Cullen defended Douthwaite, basing her defence on the hypothesis that Manningham-Buller had intentionally given up possession of vital evidence, the nurses' notebooks, which detailed Adams' treatment of the patient, adding that he actually gave them to the defence, which allowed defence counsel Frederick Geoffrey Lawrence QC to present them on the second day of the trial. Douthwaite, she claimed, was therefore not able to examine these notebooks to prepare his evidence. However, copies of the notebooks were provided to the prosecution on the second day of the trial, and Douthwaite did not start to give his evidence until the seventh day, with a weekend intervening before he finished his evidence on the tenth day. Devlin, on the contrary, criticised the police for overlooking the nurses' notebooks: there is apparently no record that the notebooks were seized by the police, and no evidence that Manningham-Buller ever had possession of them. In any event, Douthwaite's new hypothesis did not relate to the qualities of opiates administered, so much as moving the date on which he considered the planning and execution of the act of murder began, from 7 November 1950 back to 1 November 1950.

Douthwaite gave the impression that he was being inconsistent and changing his evidence speculatively, to avoid admitting he might be wrong. Devlin made a cogent criticism of the prosecution team, but aimed at Melford Stevenson rather than Manningham-Buller. This was that, as Douthwaite and Ashby were not experienced at being expert witnesses, they should have been warned to avoid speculation and prepared by the prosecution until their evidence was purged of uncertainties. The underwhelming impact of Douthwaite's evidence, coupled with defence witness John B. Harman's evidence in favour of Adams and Ashby's refusal to rule out a natural cause for Mrs Morrell's death, helped secure Adams' acquittal.

Douthwaite's performance at the trial however did not endear him to his fellow doctors, who resented his attempt to convict one of their peers. Douthwaite had previously been greatly respected within the profession, but his involvement is widely considered to have cost him the presidency of the Royal College of Physicians. As Devlin later wrote in his account of the trial, the case was "a very important one for the medical profession, which was naturally worried by the thought that the prescription of drugs might lead to a charge of murder".

Adams was only ever convicted on 13 counts of prescription fraud, lying on cremation forms, obstructing a police search and failing to keep a dangerous drugs register. He was removed from the Medical Register in 1957 and reinstated in 1961.

== Publications ==
Douthwaite wrote many textbooks:

- The injection treatment of varicose veins, London, H. K. Lewis & Co. Ltd., 1928
- The treatment of rheumatoid arthritis, London, H. K. Lewis & Co. Ltd., 1929
- The treatment of chronic arthritis, London, Cape, 1930
- The treatment of asthma, London, H. K. Lewis & Co. Ltd., 1930
- A guide to general practice, London, H. K. Lewis & Co. Ltd., 1932
- The treatment of rheumatoid arthritis and sciatica, London, H. K. Lewis & Co. Ltd., 1933
- An Index of Differential Diagnosis of Main Symptoms (with Herbert French), Bristol, John Wright, 1945 (6th edition)
- French's Index of Differential Diagnosis, Williams & Wilkins, 1960
- The use of heroin, S.I., 1956
- Materia medica, pharmacology and therapeutics (with Sir William Hale-White), London, Churchill, 1949, 1959, 1963.
