= Michael Ashby =

English neurologist

Michael George Corbett Ashby, MRCP, FRCP (1 November 1914 – 10 December 2004) was a consultant neurologist at the Whittington Hospital, London and an expert witness for the prosecution in the failed trial of suspected serial killer John Bodkin Adams.

== Life ==
Ashby (always known as "Mike") was born in London, the son of Arthur Brian Ashby, a barrister and company chairman, and Dame Margery Corbett-Ashby. He was educated at Ashdown House Preparatory School and at Oundle School. He studied medicine at New College, Oxford, and at the London Hospital. Whilst at Oxford he rowed in the boat that won the Boat Race in 1936 and 1937. At London Hospital he was United Hospitals light-heavyweight boxing champion for two successive years.

== Career ==
After qualifying, he was a house physician before joining the RAMC, where he served from 1943 until 1947, becoming a medical specialist in 1945.

On discharge from the Army in 1947 he worked at the National Hospital before returning to London Hospital as senior registrar to Russell Brain and Ronald Henson. In 1949 he was appointed consultant neurologist to the Whittington Hospital in north London, where he remained until his retirement in 1975. He succeeded Macdonald Critchley as consultant neurologist to the Royal Masonic Hospital in 1965, also retiring from there in 1975.

He also had a private Harley Street practice which involved much medico-legal work. He gave evidence in the Guenther Podola and John Bodkin Adams murder trials. His evidence in the latter in 1957 has been criticised for being too indecisive. While fellow witness Dr Arthur Douthwaite was adamant Adams had killed the victim, Edith Alice Morrell, Ashby was more hesitant. In summing up, the judge called Ashby "the key witness", one "coming between the extremes", whose "border-line evidence" made it unsafe to convict. Adams was acquitted of the Morrell charge but was due to be tried for the murder of Gertrude Hullett straight after. The prosecutor, Reginald Manningham-Buller, withdrew the charge however by entering a nolle prosequi – partly because – in his words – the case would again be "based on the evidence of Dr Ashby".

Adams was thought by Home Office pathologist Francis Camps to have killed 163 patients.

== Family ==
In 1944 Ashby married Pamela Mary Roffey. They had two sons and two daughters. Their elder daughter, Charlotte, died in a car crash in 1966, the day before her 21st birthday. In October 1982 Ashby and his wife were interviewed by the historian, Brian Harrison, primarily about his mother, as part of the Suffrage Interviews project, titled Oral evidence on the suffragette and suffragist movements: the Brian Harrison interviews.

== Personal interests ==
Ashby was a freemason and director of ceremonies at the London Hospital Lodge.
