= Frederick Geoffrey Lawrence =

British lawyer and High Court Judge

Sir Geoffrey Lawrence
- Royal coat of arms of the United Kingdom

Justice of the High Court
- In office 1965–1967

Sir Frederick Geoffrey Lawrence (5 April 1902 – 3 February 1967) was a British lawyer, High Court Judge, Chairman of the Bar Council and Chairman of the National Incomes Commission. He first came to prominence when he defended Dr John Bodkin Adams in 1957 on a charge of the murder of Mrs Edith Alice Morrell, the first murder case he handled. Prejudicial press coverage of the case prior to the trial suggested Adams was guilty and that the verdict would be a foregone conclusion, but Lawrence successfully secured an acquittal. Adams, if convicted, might have been hanged, had he also been found guilty on a second murder indictment that had been brought. Devlin at the time, and later investigation, suggested Adams was acquitted in part due to inadequate prosecution preparations and also due to the lack of strong and credible evidence.

== Early life ==
The son of a master butcher and a singing teacher, Lawrence was educated at the City of London School before going up to New College, Oxford. He enjoyed a variety of sports, but his main recreation was music, being an accomplished pianist and violinist. He was President of the University Musical Club. After graduation he acted as tutor to two sons of Jan Masaryk, travelling with the family to the United States of America, and Prague. They remained close friends until the murder of Masaryk during the Czech coup in 1948. Having decided to enter the law, Lawrence was awarded a Harmsworth scholarship and became a pupil to Eric Neve, being called to the Bar in 1930 from Middle Temple.

== Career ==
Before the Second World War Lawrence had built a respected general law practice on the south-eastern circuit. In 1944 he acted as junior to Sir Walter Monckton in a disciplinary hearing against Flight Lieutenant Pensotti, an RAF judge advocate who had been court martialled for interfering with the papers of another court martial in 1943. Lawrence and Monckton effectively turned the hearing into a retrial of the original case (despite the absence of the original witnesses), and the disciplinary hearing took no action against Pensotti, but the original court martial verdict stood. After the war, Pensotti attempted to clear his name and this first brought Lawrence's name to the attention of the press.

Lawrence now began to specialise in planning, parliamentary and divorce cases. Time magazine described Lawrence as a "puckish, mousy little man with a mind as orderly as a calculating machine". Cullen describes him similarly as "used to digesting boring technicalities", though Robert Hounsome highlights his "magnetic oratory style. 'Certainly no-one, other than his brothers (both in the legal profession) can make such polysyllables as "cerebral" and "respiratory" sound like something out of Keats'" He first achieved judicial office in 1948 with his appointment as Recorder (a part-time judge) of Tenterden. He was appointed a King's Counsel (KC) in 1950, and in 1951 he was appointed as a member of a Royal Commission investigating the laws on marriage and divorce (Royal Commission on Marriage and Divorce). In 1952 he was appointed Recorder of Canterbury, and in 1953, Chairman of the Court of Quarter Sessions for West Sussex.

In 1957 Lawrence defended John Bodkin Adams and in 1958 he successfully defended Charles Ridge, Chief Constable of Brighton, England, who was charged with conspiracy to obstruct the course of justice by taking bribes.

Lawrence was chairman of the Bar Council from 1960 to 1962. In 1962 he was appointed to chair the National Income Commission), the Commission was dissolved in 1965. He was knighted in the 1963 New Year Honours. In 1964 Lawrence was appointed a Deputy Lieutenant of Sussex, and chaired the Committee on the Remuneration of Ministers and Members of Parliament (known informally as "the Lawrence Committee").

He was appointed a High Court judge on 30 September 1965, but fell ill not long after. He died in 1967.

== Bodkin Adams case ==
Lawrence made his name defending Dr John Bodkin Adams. Adams was arrested in 1956 for the murder of two elderly widows, Gertrude Hullett and Edith Alice Morrell. He was tried for the murder of the latter in 1957 with the prosecution, led by Sir Reginald Manningham-Buller, alleging that he had killed her with excessive doses of heroin and morphine for mercenary motives. Lawrence was hired by the Medical Defence Union to defend Adams, making this Lawrence's first capital case. Indeed, Time magazine described Lawrence as "a relative stranger in criminal court". He was assisted by Edward Clarke QC and junior counsel was John Heritage.

Lawrence's conduct of the defence was admired by many. On just the second day of the trial he dropped a bombshell. While cross-examining a witness, one of the nurses who had taken care of Mrs Morrell, some "notebooks" the nurses had kept were mentioned. Unfortunately they had long ago gone 'missing'. Lawrence summarised the situation: "If only we had those old books we could see the truth of exactly what happened."

To the surprise of all but the defence team, he then produced eight notebooks which had been written by the nurses, detailing their and Adams' treatment of Morrell. The entries differed markedly from the accounts in witness statements produced by the police from testimony obtained in 1956. The prosecution was wrong-footed and never fully recovered from the notebooks showing far less opiates had been given to Mrs Morrell than had been suggested in the opening prosecution speech. Testimony from expert witnesses for the prosecution, Dr Arthur Douthwaite and Dr Michael Ashby, was rendered ineffective as they had prepared their hypothesis of murder by opiate poisoning based on the police evidence of the amounts of opiates prescribed and the assumption that everything prescribed had been administered, without having had access to the detailed evidence of amounts administered in the notebooks. When they attempted to adjust their evidence to take the notebooks into account, they were accused by Lawrence of being inconsistent.

Lawrence again surprised the court with his decision not to call the defendant as a witness. Although it was not obligatory for the defendant to give his or her version of events, and a defendant's legal right to silence had been acknowledged since the turn of the 20th century, when it first became legal for a defendant to give evidence in their defence under oath,) it had become usual for them to do so. Therefore, when Lawrence announced that Adams would not speak in his own defence, it surprised many present in court, with Devlin considered that Lawrence was taking a risk in not allowing Adams to enter the witness box, although conceding that Adams' garrulousness was a credible reason for that strategy. Most surprised of all was the prosecutor, Manningham-Buller. He had been expecting Adams giving evidence, and being able both to provoke him onto making the sort of damaging admissions that the police had recorded and discrediting his explanation of events. When this opportunity was not presented, the prosecution strategy was thrown into disarray.

Lawrence is also remembered for his final address to the jury:

Justice is of paramount consideration here, and the only way in which this can be done is for you to judge the matter on what you have heard in this court and in this court only.

What you read in the papers, what you hear in the train, what you hear in the cafés and restaurants, what your friends and relations come and tell you; rumour, gossip, all the rest of it, may be so wrong.

The possibility of guilt is not enough, suspicion is not enough, probability is not enough, likelihood is not. A criminal matter is not a question of balancing probabilities and deciding in favour of a probability.

If the accusation is not proved beyond reasonable doubt against the man accused in the dock, then by law he is entitled to be acquitted, because that is the way our rules work.

It is no concession to given him the benefit of the doubt. He is entitled by law to a verdict of not guilty.

Adams was acquitted after just 44 minutes and the case made Lawrence's reputation.

== Personal life ==
In 1941 Lawrence married Marjorie Avice. She survived him and they had no children. In his spare time Lawrence was an accomplished violinist, having played first violin for the orchestra of the Oxford Bach Choir under Sir Hugh Allen.
