= Donald Teare =

Manx pathologist (1911–1979)

Donald Teare FRCP FRCPath

Professor of Forensic Medicine, University of London
- In office 1967–1975

Personal details
- Born: Robert Donald Teare; 1 July 1911 Isle of Man
- Died: 17 January 1979 (aged 67) Castletown, Isle of Man
- Parent: Albert Hugh Teare (father)

Robert Donald Teare (1 July 1911 – 17 January 1979) was a senior Manx pathologist.

== Early life ==
Teare was born 1 July 1911, the son of Albert Hugh Teare MHK for Ramsey. He was educated at King William's College near Castletown. He graduated from Gonville and Caius College, Cambridge and then trained at St George's Hospital, London, where he qualified in 1936. He married Kathleen Agnes Gracey in 1937.

== Career ==
Teare began his career as a lecturer in forensic medicine at St Bartholomew's Hospital Medical College. In 1963 he became reader at St George's Hospital, where he established a department of Forensic Medicine, and eventually professor of forensic medicine at Charing Cross Hospital Medical School, a post he held until retirement in 1975. Teare was also a lecturer at the Metropolitan Police College, Hendon, and served as President of the Medical Defence Union. He was a Fellow of the Royal College of Physicians and of the Royal College of Pathologists, and served as President of the British Association in Forensic Medicine in 1962.

Teare published the first modern description of hypertrophic cardiomyopathy in 1958. Today this disease is considered the leading cause of sudden cardiac death in young athletes.

In 1973, Teare carried out the post mortem on Bruce Lee, as well as Jimi Hendrix's in 1970. Teare supervised the post mortem of Brian Epstein in 1967.

Together with Keith Simpson and Francis Camps, Teare was one of the "Three Musketeers", who dealt with almost all the suspicious deaths in the London area. He was called to give evidence in many high-profile criminal investigations, such as the murder of Beryl Evans and her baby Geraldine in the Timothy Evans case. Teare's accident investigations included the Harrow and Wealdstone rail crash, which killed 112 people in 1952, and some of the victims of South African Airways Flight 201.

== Later life and death ==
Teare retired to his hometown of Castletown in 1975. He died 17 January 1979, at the age of 67.

== Sources ==
- Obituary, The Times, 19 November 1979, p. 30
- Mitchel P. Roth, "Historical dictionary of law enforcement", Greenwood Publishing Group, 2001, ISBN 0-313-30560-9, p. 344
- Obituary, British Medical Journal, 3 February 1979, p. 354
