= William Hale-White =

British physician and medical biographer

Sir William Hale-White
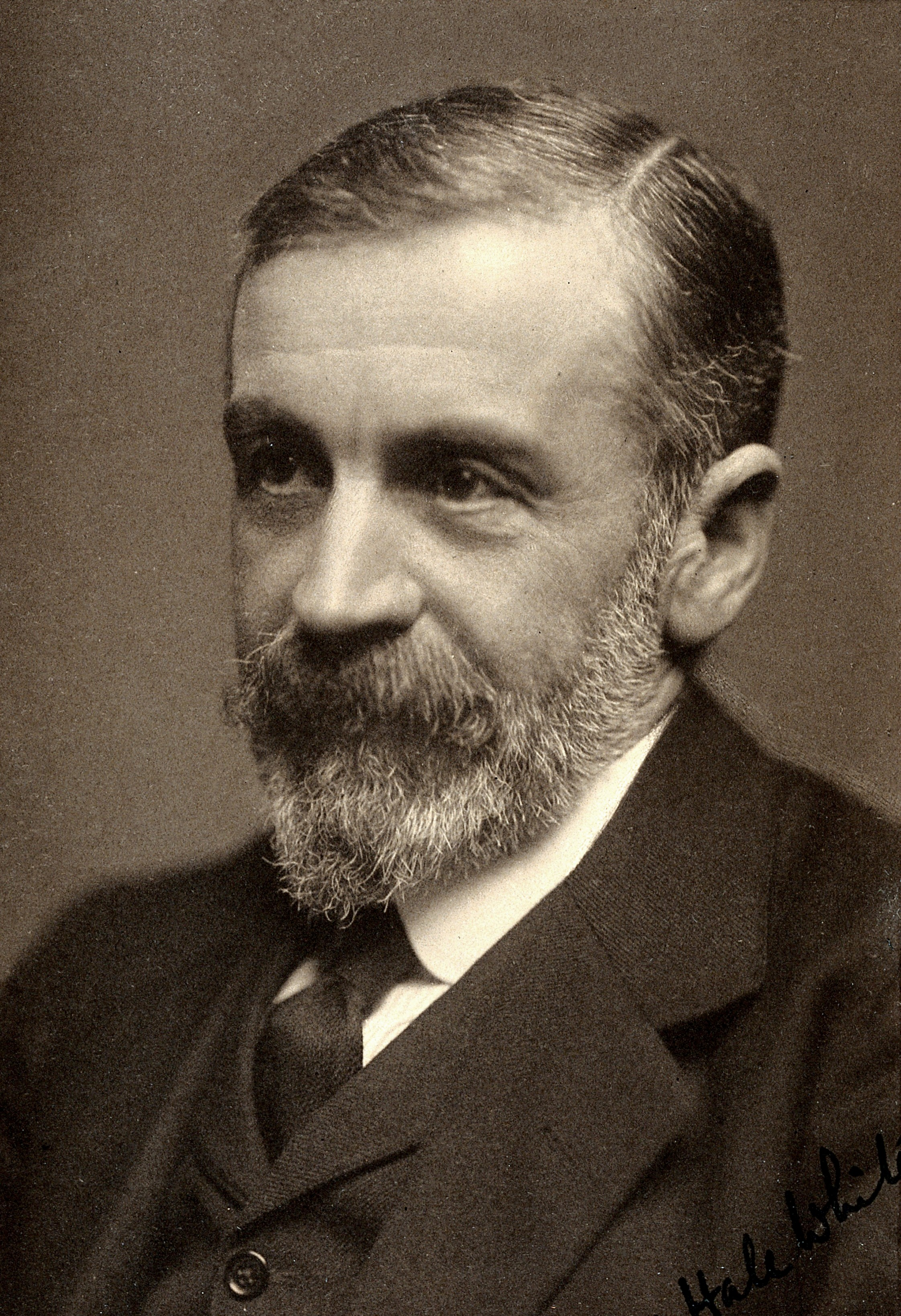
- Born: 7 November 1857; London, England
- Died: 26 February 1949 (aged 91); Oxford
- Occupation: physician

Sir William Hale-White KBE FRCP (7 November 1857 – 26 February 1949) was a British physician and medical biographer. He was the son of writer Mark Rutherford.

== Career ==
Hale-White was appointed an assistant physician at Guy's Hospital in 1886, a physician in 1890 and consulting physician from 1917. During the First World War, he was a colonel in the RAMC and was created KBE in 1919.

He was elected president of the Medical Society of London (1920–1921), the Royal Society of Medicine (1922–1924) and of the Association of Physicians of Great Britain and Ireland (1930).

The term ulcerative colitis entered general medical vocabulary in 1888 after Hale-White published a report of various cases of "ulcerative colitis". However, Samuel Wilks in 1859 was the first person to use the term ulcerative colitis.

== Retirement ==
Hale-White remained active in history of medicine following retirement. In this field, he is best known for his categorising of William Withering's letters, bequeathed by William Osler to The History of Medicine Society at The Royal Society of Medicine, London. His literary contributions also include works on René Laennec and John Keats.

== Family life ==
In 1886, Hale-White married Edith Fripp the daughter of Alfred Downing Fripp and sister of Sir Alfred Fripp, surgeon to Edward VII and George V. The couple had three sons: Alfred, Leonard (who died in 1917 when H.M.S. Natal exploded) and Reginald – who became a physician. His wife died in 1945 and Hale-White died at his home in Oxford on 26 February 1949 aged 91.

== Books ==
- Great Doctors of the Nineteenth Century, 1935
- Keats as Doctor and Patient, 1938
- Materia medica, pharmacology and therapeutics (assisted by Arthur Henry Douthwaite), London, Churchill, 1949, 1959, 1963.
- Translation of selected passages from De l'auscultation mediate, Rene Laennec, 1923.
