= Hale White =

British writer

William Hale White
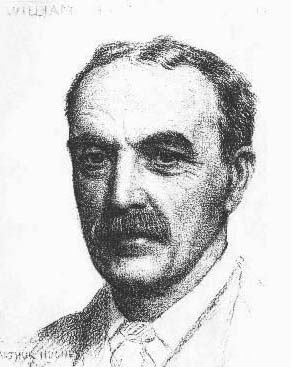
- 1887 crayon drawing by Arthur Hughes
- Born: 22 December 1831; Bedford, England
- Died: 14 March 1913 (aged 81); Groombridge, England
- Education: Bedford Modern School
- Known for: Author

William Hale White (22 December 1831 – 14 March 1913), known by his pseudonym Mark Rutherford, was a British writer and civil servant. His obituary in The Times stated that the "employment of a pseudonym, and sometimes of two (for some of 'Mark Rutherford's' work was 'edited by his friend, Reuben Shapcott'), was sufficient to prove a retiring disposition, and Mr. Hale White was little before the world in person."

== Life, career and memorials ==
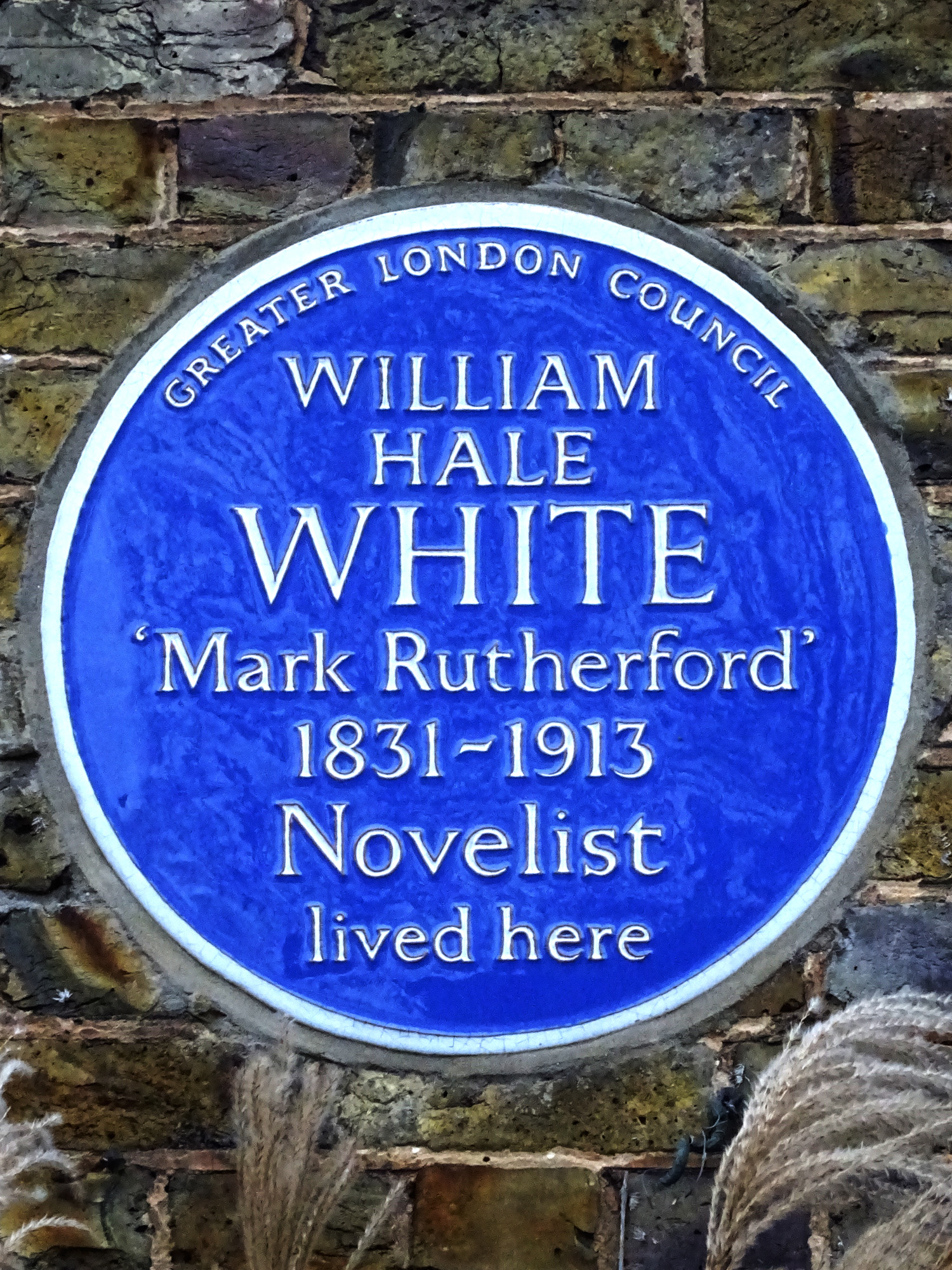
Plaque in Carshalton

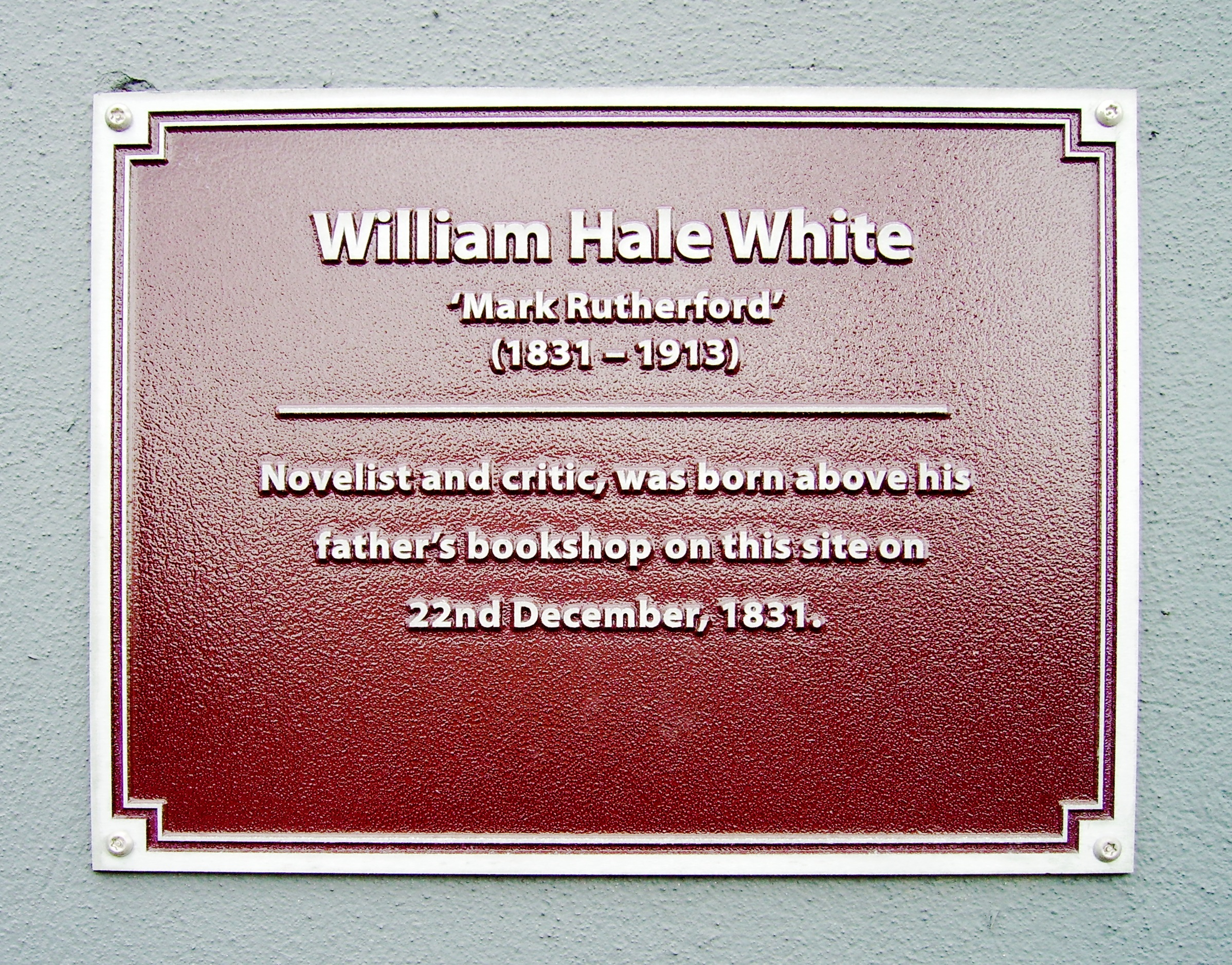
Plaque at his birthplace, Bedford

White was born in Bedford. His father, William White, a member of the Nonconformist community of the Bunyan Meeting, became well known as a doorkeeper at the House of Commons and wrote sketches of parliamentary life for the Illustrated Times. A selection of his parliamentary sketches was published posthumously, in 1897, by Justin McCarthy, the Irish nationalist MP, as The Inner Life of the House of Commons.

White himself was educated in Bedford at Bedford Modern School, then known as the English School, until the family moved to London. In 1848 he entered the Countess of Huntingdon's College, Cheshunt to train for the Congregational Ministry. He developed increasingly unconventional views and in 1850 wrote to Thomas Carlyle who responded with a full reply encouraging him to stand by his convictions. White later entered New College, London, but the further development of his views prevented him taking up that career and he was expelled for questioning aspects of scripture. Hale White became known as a dissenter.

In 1852 he was employed by John Chapman to work as a personal assistant and subscription tout at The Westminster Review. White was an early proponent of women's rights. Having worked alongside her for The Westminster Review, White was a friend of George Eliot and they both lodged at 142 Strand, London which was owned by John Chapman. White wrote an article about his friendship with George Eliot for The Bookman in August 1902 entitled "George Eliot as I knew her".

In 1854, White joined the civil service, first as a clerk at the Registrar General's Office at Somerset House and later as a clerk at the Admiralty. In 1861 he began writing newspaper articles to increase his income, having met and married Harriet Arthur in 1856 at the Congregational Church in Kentish Town, and started a family.

As a journalist he wrote for The Aberdeen Herald, The Birmingham Post, The Morning Star, The Nonconformist, The Rochdale News and The Scotsman. Over fourteen years he wrote parliamentary sketches for The Birmingham Post. He also contributed articles on literary figures in The Contemporary Review, Macmillan's Magazine, The Spectator, The Athenaeum, The Bookman and, the nonconformist, The British Weekly, including essays on Byron, Goethe, Shelley and Dorothy Wordsworth.

White had already served his apprenticeship to journalism before he made his name, or rather his pen name, "Mark Rutherford", famous with three novels, supposedly edited by one Reuben Shapcott: The Autobiography of Mark Rutherford (1881), Mark Rutherford's Deliverance (1885) and The Revolution in Tanner's Lane (1887). George Orwell described Deliverance as "one of the best novels in English."

Under his own name White translated Spinoza's Ethics (1883). His later books include Miriam's Schooling, and Other Papers (1890), Catherine Furze (2 vols, 1893), Clara Hopgood (1896), Pages from a Journal, with Other Papers (1900), and John Bunyan (1905).

Hale White died in Groombridge on 14 March 1913 at the age of 81. One of his obituaries stated that:

Mr White's novels have a poignant quality of sadness, in which, however, there is both nobility and beauty. He seems to be recording the revelation of a soul's experience, and in the simplicity and directness of his narrative, he is somewhat akin, to the great Russian novelists.

André Gide, in a letter dated 4 October 1915, thanked Arnold Bennett for recommending White's works. Gide so admired The Autobiography of Mark Rutherford and Mark Rutherford's Deliverance that he considered writing French translations. He stated that they had lifted him out of the 'slough of despond', a reference coined by Bunyan about whom White had written.

D. H. Lawrence wrote about White's work:

And I have always a greater respect for Mark Rutherford: I do think he is jolly good – so thorough, so sound, and so beautiful.

Claire Tomalin, the biographer of Charles Dickens and Thomas Hardy, wrote that White's novels:

draw directly on a private store of memories and emotions, and you sense quite strongly that he took up a mask in order to be nakedly confessional in a way he could not otherwise have managed.

George Orwell refers to Mark Rutheford's Deliverance as "one of the best novels in English" in his column As I Please.

Mark Rutherford School in Bedford is named after him and he has a blue commemorative plaque at 19 Park Hill in Carshalton. There is also a plaque above his birthplace in Bedford that was unveiled by his son, Sir William Hale-White. When he retired from the Admiralty in 1892, he lived in Hastings for a number of years where a memorial plaque commemorates him.

== Family ==
White's first wife, Harriet, died in 1891 of multiple sclerosis. Two of their children had died in infancy. In 1907, the widower White met aspiring novelist Dorothy Vernon Horace Smith, the daughter of Horace Smith who was a magistrate and minor poet. They fell in love and were married three and a half years later, but enjoyed only two years of married life before his death. At the time of her marriage to White, Dorothy was forty-five years his junior.

His eldest son by his first wife, Sir William Hale-White, was a distinguished doctor. His second son, Jack, married Agnes Hughes, one of Arthur Hughes's daughters. Arthur Hughes had himself produced a crayon drawing of Hale White in 1887. A third son became an engineer, and White's daughter Molly remained at home to care for her father.

== Selected publications ==
- The Autobiography of Mark Rutherford: Dissenting Minister, Trubner and Co., London, 1881
- Spinoza's Ethics, translated from the Latin, Trubner and Co., London, 1883
- Mark Rutherford's Deliverance, Trubner and Co., London, 1885
- The Revolution in Tanner's Lane, Trubner and Co., London, 1887
- Miriam's Schooling Kegan Paul, Trench, Trubner and Co., London, 1890
- Catharine Furze, T. Fisher Unwin, London, 1893
- Clara Hopgood, T. Fisher Unwin, London, 1896
- An Examination of the Charge of Apostasy against Wordsworth, Longman, 1898
- Pages from a Journal, with Other Papers, T. Fisher Unwin, London, 1900
- John Bunyan, Hodder & Stoughton, London, 1905
- More Pages From a Journal, Oxford University Press, 1910
- The Early Life of Mark Rutherford (W. Hale White), Oxford University Press, 1913
- The Last Pages from a Journal, Oxford University Press, 1915. Published posthumously and prefaced by his widow, Dorothy

== Selected work as editor or note contributor ==
- A Description of the Wordsworth and Coleridge Manuscripts in the Possession of Mr. T. Norton Longman, Longman, 1897. Notes by W. Hale White
- Johnson, Samuel. Selections from Dr. Samuel Johnson's Rambler, Clarendon Press, Oxford, 1907. Edited with Preface and Notes by W. Hale White
- Carlyle, Thomas. The Life of John Sterling, Oxford University Press, 1907. With an introduction by W. Hale White

== Quotes ==
Men should not be too curious in analysing and condemning any means which nature devises to save them from themselves, whether it be coins, old books, curiosities, butterflies, or fossils.

— Mark Rutherford, The Autobiography of Mark Rutherford

To die is easy when we are in perfect health. On a fine spring morning, out of doors, on the downs, mind and body sound and exhilarated, it would be nothing to lie down on the turf and pass away.

— Mark Rutherford, More Pages from a Journal
