= Guenther Podola =

German murderer (1929–1959)

Guenther Fritz Erwin Podola
- Podola in 1959
- Born: 8 February 1929; Berlin, Germany
- Died: 5 November 1959 (aged 30); Wandsworth Prison, London, United Kingdom
- Other name: Mike Colato
- Occupation: Thief
- Status: Executed by hanging
- Conviction: Capital murder
- Penalty: Death

Guenther Fritz Erwin Podola (8 February 1929 – 5 November 1959, alias Mike Colato) was a German-born petty thief, and the last man to be hanged in the UK for killing a police officer. His trial was controversial because of his defence of amnesia and the use of expert witnesses to determine whether his illness was real.

== Life ==
Podola was born in Berlin, Germany. He was a fanatical member of the Hitler Youth movement. Podola moved to Canada in August 1952. On 1 March 1957 he was sentenced to 10 days' imprisonment following a conviction for burglary in Montreal. Then on 26 March he was sentenced for another 11 counts of theft and burglary and imprisoned for 2 years. On 25 July 1958 Podola was released and deported back to West Germany.

== London ==
Podola moved to London on 21 May 1959. He assumed the alias of Mike Colato and pretended to be a gangster. He broke into the house of an American model, Verne Schiffmann in Roland Gardens, and stole jewellery and furs worth £2,000. He offered to return her possessions for £500, but she notified the police who attempted to arrest Podola on 12 July 1959 in Kensington. Podola shot one of the officers, Detective Sergeant Raymond Purdy, through the heart with a Radom 9mm semi-automatic pistol, after he ran into a house at 105 Onslow Square. He was later apprehended. He claimed that he was beaten up by the police, and, as a result, lost his memory of events. The police claimed that he was merely hit on the head when they broke down the door to his hotel room.

== Trial ==
The start of the trial was delayed for nine days while a jury heard evidence of whether Podola was medically fit to stand trial. After 3 1/2 hours of deliberation, they decided he was. A fresh jury was called to hear the trial itself which commenced on 18 July 1959. When asked for his plea, he replied: "I do not remember the crime for which I stand accused ... I am unable to answer the charges." He was defended by Frederick Lawton QC. Neurologist Michael Ashby gave evidence as an expert medical witness at his trial, as did psychiatrist Archibald Leigh, who claimed Podola was feigning his illness.

The jury took 38 minutes to find Podola guilty of murder, and he was sentenced to death by the trial judge, Mr Justice Edmund Davies. He later confessed his guilt. The Home Secretary, Rab Butler, under a little-known and little-used power, referred the case to the Court of Criminal Appeal, which upheld the conviction. The Attorney-General's refusal of leave to appeal to the House of Lords brought the case to a close in a fresh outburst of public controversy. Podola was hanged at Wandsworth Prison at 9:45 a.m. on 5 November 1959. He was buried in the prison graveyard (grave 59). His execution took place five years before the last execution of any criminal and six years before the suspension and later abolition of the death penalty.
