= Nolle prosequi =

Legal term

Nolle prosequi, (Note: /ˌnɒli ˈprɒsɪkwaɪ, ˌnoʊli-/ NOL-ee PROSS-ih-kwy, NOH-lee -. US also /- ˈproʊsɪ-, -kwi/ - PROH-sih, -kwee.) abbreviated nol or nolle pros, is legal Latin meaning "to be unwilling to pursue". It is a type of prosecutorial discretion in common law, used for prosecutors' declarations that they are voluntarily ending a criminal case before trial or before a verdict is rendered; it is a kind of motion to dismiss and contrasts with an involuntary dismissal.

== Application in United States law ==
Nolle prosequi as a declaration is most often used in criminal cases, but in jurisdictions making use of nolle prosequi in civil lawsuits, it is used by a plaintiff that voluntarily drops its claims. In civil cases, a retraxit or a motion for voluntary dismissal may be made by a plaintiff instead of a declaration of nolle prosequi, depending upon the custom and rules of a given jurisdiction.

=== Decision-maker ===
Nolle prosequi as a declaration can be made by a prosecutor in a criminal case either before or during trial, resulting in the prosecutor declining to further pursue the case against a defendant. Courts seldom challenge applications for nolle prosequi. In the United States, judges will usually sign a dismissal order prepared by the prosecution or make a docket entry indicating the disposition of the case to be nolle prosse after a declaration or motion by the prosecution.

In criminal cases in the United States, it has been held improper for a court to enter an order of nolle prosequi on its own, without a motion by the prosecutor, but as to sentencing discrepancies involved in a sentence recommendation, a trial judge is authorized to reject an underlying guilty plea based upon concerns of fairness and justice or because it is presented after the plea cutoff date. The notes to Rule 48 of the US Federal Rules of Criminal Procedure (FRCRP) draw attention to the effect of the rule as contrasting with common law. Rule 48 now mandates that prosecutors seek leave of the court before they dismiss a case via filing a nolle prosequi.

=== Reason ===
The declaration may be made because the charges cannot be proved because vital witnesses have become unavailable or uncooperative, the evidence is too weak to carry the burden of proof, the evidence is fatally flawed in light of the claims that are brought, the prosecutor becomes doubtful that the defendant is guilty, the defendant's innocence is proven, or the defendant has died. It has also been used when a federal criminal charge is brought up against a defendant when the prosecutor on a state charge for the same offense no longer wishes to pursue the case. Usually, that happens when the state prosecutor is content with the sentence on the federal charge and has no need to go any further with the original case.

=== Timing ===
In criminal cases, nolle prosequi declarations are made generally after an indictment as long as adjudication on the merits has not occurred or, in some jurisdictions, as long as a trial has not commenced. In civil cases, nolle prosequi declarations are made either before the trial begins or before a judgment on the merits is rendered, depending on the rules of the jurisdiction.

=== Legal effect ===
The entry of a nolle prosequi is not an acquittal. Since the principle of double jeopardy therefore does not apply, the defendant may later be indicted on the same charge again.

=== Application in civil cases ===
In civil cases, a nolle prosequi or voluntary dismissal may be entered as to one of several counts or claims, or as to one of several defendants, or both. In any jurisdiction, whether a motion for voluntary dismissal or a declaration of nolle prosequi is used, federal and state rules of civil procedure generally govern when, how, and why claims may be voluntarily dismissed and apply different rules to different types of claims and to whether a court may give leave to dismiss a matter with or without prejudice.

=== Similarity to a declination of prosecution ===
Nolle prosequi is similar to a declination of prosecution, which is an agreement not to prosecute made before any charges are brought or suit has been filed. A declination of prosecution may be made by an attorney or may be made as an agreement between the aggrieved party and the claimant.

In contrast, nolle prosequi is usually made after a decision to prosecute has already been made. A declination of prosecution may be made for many reasons, such as weak evidence or a conflict of interest.

== Application and legal effect in English law ==
The power of entering a nolle prosequi is now rarely used, mostly in cases where a defendant is permanently physically or mentally unfit to appear in court, or when an ordinary member of the public has brought private criminal proceedings which the Attorney General considers it is not in the public interest to continue. In practice, where a prosecution is not to be taken forward due to flaws identified in the evidence or the prosecution no longer being in the public interest, the prosecutor will generally offer no evidence and the court will acquit the defendant.

In the past, a nolle prosequi was also used to protect a person who was given immunity from prosecution. A nolle prosequi acts as an indefinite adjournment to the case, not an acquittal. While terminating the proceedings, it does not bar the defendant from being indicted again, but there is no known case of this happening in the century before 1957, or since.

However, in the Al-Yamamah arms deal, the Director of the Serious Fraud Office was pressured by the Attorney General to terminate an investigation into a claim that BAE Systems had bribed influential persons in Saudi Arabia to secure a profitable defence contract. Although initial pressure from BAE on the grounds of economic damage and the disruption of friendly relations with Saudi Arabia was resisted both by the Director and the Attorney General, further pressure from the Prime Minister, under pressure from the Saudi government which threatened to end co-operation against terrorism, resulted in the Director agreeing to halt the investigation. The Director's decision was challenged by several public interest organisations, and their challenge succeeded in the Divisional Court but failed in the House of Lords on the basis that the Director would have known that the Attorney General could stop any prosecution agreed to by the Director by entering a nolle prosequi, and so his decision not to prosecute was reasonable and lawful.

=== Decision-maker and timing ===
Only the attorney general can enter a nolle prosequi, acting in the public interest. The attorney general is not answerable to the courts but to Parliament for how this power is exercised. It can be entered at any stage after an indictment has been signed and before a Crown Court judgment is made. A nolle prosequi will usually be requested from the attorney general by the defence but an application can also be made by the prosecution.

=== Text ===
The text of a writ of nolle prosequi in England and Wales is as follows:

THE KING

V

AB

Let a nolle prosequi be entered in my name in the case of AB, whose proceedings at [court name] on a charge of [offence (indictment number)] currently stands adjourned, in order to discharge all further proceedings relating to AB therein AND FOR SO DOING THIS WILL BE YOUR WARRANT.

HIS MAJESTY'S ATTORNEY GENERAL
Dated this day of 20XX

Historically, nolle prosequi was done by way of a Royal Warrant, the main difference being that a Royal Warrant was from the Sovereign directing the Attorney General to do something; whereas a writ of nolle prosequi was done by the Attorney General himself.

== Nolle prosequi in other jurisdictions ==
=== Canada ===
The equivalent power in Canada is a Crown-directed stay of charges. This causes the prosecution to be suspended for a period of one year before an outright dismissal; in practice stayed prosecutions are almost never recommenced.

=== Ireland ===
The power of entering a nolle prosequi in the Republic of Ireland rests with the Director of Public Prosecutions, and its use is normally in cases where there are problems with the evidence that would make it difficult for the case to proceed. The director may in theory pursue the prosecution later, but this rarely, if ever, happens. As the accused enjoys the presumption of innocence that all accused people enjoy until they are convicted, an entry of a nolle prosequi is equated with innocence. This power is quite widely used: about one-quarter of the indictments for rape in 2013 were ended by entry of a nolle prosequi.

=== Australia ===
Although there are differences in practice between the different states and territories, the attorney-general, solicitor-general or designated law officer in each may enter a nolle prosequi, with the effects that the indictment is not proceeded with and the accused person is discharged. Although the general practice is not to revive the proceedings, this may be done if important new evidence comes to light or where it is in the interests of justice to do so. It is not uncommon for a nolle prosequi to be entered because the evidence available to the prosecution is often not reviewed by senior prosecuting counsel, and found to be inadequate a few days before the trial date, or a witness refuses to testify.

Attempts by the prosecution to enter a nolle prosequi in order to avoid a trial which has started from reaching its conclusion, for example, where a jury may have signalled their likely verdict, where the case has gone badly for the prosecution or where the prosecutor has proceeded without an unavailable witness, have been regarded by the Australian courts as an abuse of process, as the prosecution may hope to reinstate the charges before a different jury or with the missing witness. This rule applies even if entering the nolle prosequi was not challenged when it was done. A number of other cases have been brought before the Australian courts, claiming that the reinstatement of charges after entry of a nolle prosequi is an abuse of process in other circumstances. None has succeeded, as the relevant circumstances did not constitute abuse, but the appellate court stated that there could be case where making a charge following the entering of a nolle could be oppressive and so an abuse of the court process.

=== India ===
In India this power is guided by Section 321 of Criminal Procedure Code which enables the public prosecutor or the assistant public prosecutor to withdraw from the prosecution of any person either generally or in respect of any one or more of the offences for which he is tried. For doing so, consent of the court is necessary.

=== Nigeria ===
An attorney-general is the chief law officer both of the Federation of Nigeria and of each Nigerian state, and is also a government minister there. Under the 1999 Constitution of Nigeria, the federal attorney-general has powers to institute or to take over and continue any criminal proceedings, and to discontinue them at any stage before a final judgement is delivered. The last power gives statutory authority to the practice of nolle prosequi, which has existed in Nigeria since the colonial era. It is not necessary for the attorney-general to ask for the consent of the court hearing the case, as was confirmed by the Federal Appeal Court in 1981. During the Second Nigerian Republic of 1979–1983, the state attorneys-general also had the power to issue a nolle prosequi, and abused this power in a few notorious cases, but this power is now only available to the federal attorney-general.

=== Ghana ===
The Attorney-General of Ghana has statutory power to issue a nolle prosequi under the Ghanaian Criminal Procedure Code of 1960, which acts to discontinue any criminal proceedings before a final judgement is made. A nolle prosequi was issued in several cases in 2001, when criminal libel cases brought against several journalists by one political party when in power were discontinued after a change of government. A number of cases have been brought on whether there are any restrictions on the attorney-general's discretion when issuing a nolle prosequi. These have concluded that nolle prosequi terminates a case in favour of the accused, without preventing new proceedings being issued later, and that the attorney general is answerable neither to the court in which the case was discontinued nor to any appellate court. However, these cases predate the 1992 Constitution of Ghana, which gives the Supreme Court oversight of any discretionary power vested in any person, although no case has been brought against any Attorney-General of Ghana for failure to use his discretion fairly, despite claims of political bias in the use of nolle prosequi.

=== South Africa ===
In South Africa, the National Prosecuting Authority (NPA) is responsible for bringing criminal prosecutions on behalf of the state. In cases where the NPA decides not to proceed with a prosecution, a private individual with a direct interest may in terms of Section 7 of the Criminal Procedure Act bring a private criminal prosecution against an individual. The private prosecutor must first apply for a nolle prosequi from the Director of Public Prosecutions (to confirm that the State does not intend to proceed with a trial), and bring the private prosecution within three months.

== Notable cases and other references ==
- The prosecution of Jefferson Davis for treason was dropped in 1868 after a declaration of general amnesty by President Andrew Johnson.
- The trial of the prime suspect for the 1902 Peasenhall murder in Suffolk in England was stopped by the Attorney General after two juries failed to reach a verdict.
- In 1924, Connecticut prosecutor Homer Stille Cummings dismissed charges against Harold Israel, a vagrant accused of murdering a popular priest in Bridgeport, Connecticut. Cummings demolished the evidence his own office had compiled against Israel in a 90-minute courtroom presentation. The case became the basis of the 1947 film Boomerang!
- In 1925, prosecutors elected to dismiss murder charges against the remaining ten defendants in the case of People vs. Ossian Sweet. It involved a black family that had defended its home against a white mob. They were defended by attorney Clarence Darrow, who was retained by the National Association for the Advancement of Colored People. The trial was presided over by Detroit Recorder's Court Judge Frank Murphy, who went on to become an Associate Justice of the Supreme Court of the United States. After an initial mistrial, Henry Sweet (Ossian's brother, who admitted he fired the shot) was acquitted by a jury on grounds of self-defense; the dismissals of the charges against the ten remaining defendants followed.
- In 1957, John Bodkin Adams, who worked in Eastbourne, England, was tried for the murder of an elderly widow, Edith Alice Morrell and indicted, but not tried for the murder of another widow, Gertrude Hullett. When he was found not guilty of killing the former, Attorney-General Sir Reginald Manningham-Buller controversially entered a nolle prosequi regarding the latter charge. The trial judge, Mr Justice Devlin, in his post-trial book commented: "The use of nolle prosequi to conceal the deficiencies of the prosecution was an abuse of process, which left an innocent man under the suspicion that there might have been something in the talk of mass murder after all."
- The Bertie Wooster character in the Jeeves novels by P. G. Wodehouse frequently enters a nolle prosequi when refusing to do something another character is asking him to do.
- In 1982, a prosecution concerning the play The Romans in Britain by Howard Brenton collapsed after it was demonstrated that what a witness had thought was an erect penis shown on stage during a male rape scene was in fact an actor's thumb. The case had been brought at the urging of the morality campaigner Mary Whitehouse, who had not seen the play; it was ended with a nolle prosequi.
- In 2004, rape charges against basketball player Kobe Bryant were dropped after the complainant refused to testify.
- In 2011, as a result of his death, charges against Osama bin Laden were dropped with the filing of a nolle prosequi in a Manhattan federal court by the U.S. Department of Justice.
- In 2019, subsequent to the Boston straight pride parade, a justice of the Massachusetts Supreme Judicial Court held that a notice of nolle prosequi could not be denied by a judge. Notice of nolle prosequi was found to be within the prosecutor's right to exercise judgment and manage limited resources. "[The trial court judge's] effort to do so violated the Commonwealth's constitutional rights."
- While on trial for corruption in September 2022, former South African president Jacob Zuma brought a private prosecution against the state prosecutor in his corruption trial, Billy Downer, and a journalist covering the case, Karyn Maughan. Zuma accused Downer of leaking private information to Maughan, a charge which both denied as they said the information was in the public domain. Zuma received a nolle prosequi as the Director of Public Prosecutions did not believe an offence had been committed. Both Downer and Maughan applied to High Court for the case to be dismissed before trial. In December 2022, Zuma relied on the same nolle prosequi to bring a private prosecution against his successor Cyril Ramaphosa, accusing him of being an accessory after the fact to Downer and Maughan's alleged actions. The status of this nolle prosequi was contested as there was a dispute whether a nolle prosqui obtained in one case could be applied to another. In January 2023, the Johannesburg High Court stayed the prosecution of Ramaphosa until a later date when a court could consider the validity of the nolle prosequi and other issues raised by Ramaphosa.

== See also ==
- Confession of error: When used by the Solicitor General of the United States, it has the same effect as a nolle prosequi, but may be used in civil suits as well.
- Deferred prosecution
- Diversion program
- Opportunity principle: in Dutch law, this is a generalized (principalized) form of nolle prosequi.
- Plea bargain
- Scopes trial
- Non-prosecution of Eric Adams

== External resources ==
- U.S. Federal Rules of Criminal Procedure, Rule 48.
- "Nolle Prosequi" . Encyclopædia Britannica. Vol. 19 (11th ed.). 1911. p. 734.
