= Patrick Devlin, Baron Devlin =

British judge and legal philosopher (1905–1992)

The Right Honourable The Lord Devlin PC FBA
- Lord Devlin in 1962 by Walter Bird

Lord of Appeal in Ordinary
- In office 11 October 1961 – 10 January 1964
- Preceded by: The Lord Tucker
- Succeeded by: The Lord Donovan

Lord Justice of Appeal
- In office 8 January 1960 – 11 October 1961
- Succeeded by: Sir Kenneth Diplock

Justice of the High Court
- In office 14 October 1948 – 8 January 1960

Personal details
- Born: 25 November 1905 Chislehurst, Kent, England
- Died: 9 August 1992 (aged 86) Pewsey, Wiltshire
- Spouse: Madeleine Hilda Oppenheimer (m. 1932)
- Children: 6
- Education: Christ's College, Cambridge

Patrick Arthur Devlin, Baron Devlin PC FBA (25 November 1905 – 9 August 1992) was a British judge and legal philosopher. The second-youngest English High Court judge in the 20th century, he served as a Lord of Appeal in Ordinary from 1960 to 1964.

In 1959, Devlin headed the Devlin Commission, which reported on the State of Emergency declared by the colonial governor of Nyasaland. In 1985 he became the first British judge to write a book about a case he had presided over, the 1957 trial of suspected serial killer John Bodkin Adams. Devlin was involved in the debate about homosexuality in British law; in response to the Wolfenden report, he argued, contrary to H. L. A. Hart, that a common public morality should be upheld.

Devlin's daughter Clare, then aged 81, said in 2021 that her father had sexually abused her from the age of 7 until her teens.

== Early life and education ==
Patrick Devlin was born in Chislehurst, Kent. His father was an Irish Roman Catholic architect whose own father came from County Tyrone, and his mother was a Scottish Protestant, originally from Aberdeen. In 1909, a few years after Devlin's birth, the family moved to his mother's birthplace. The children were raised as Catholics. Two of Devlin's sisters became nuns; one brother was the actor William Devlin and another became a Jesuit priest.

Devlin joined the Dominican Order as a novice after leaving Stonyhurst College, but left after a year for Christ's College, Cambridge. At Cambridge, Devlin read both History and Law, and was elected President of Cambridge Union in 1926. He graduated in 1927, having obtained a Lower Second for both parts of his degree.

== Legal and judicial career ==
He joined Gray's Inn in 1927, passing the bar exam in 1929. He worked as devil for William Jowitt while Jowitt was Attorney-General, and by the late 1930s had a successful commercial practice. During the Second World War he worked for several government ministries. He took silk in 1939 and was Attorney-General of the Duchy of Cornwall between 1947 and 1948.

=== High Court judge ===
In 1948, Jowitt (by then Lord Chancellor) made Devlin, then aged only 42, a High Court judge, assigned to the King's Bench Division; he received the customary knighthood later that year. From 1956 to 1960 he also served as the first President of the Restrictive Practices Court.

In October 1954, it was Devlin who presided over the trial of Styllou Christofi, a Greek Cypriot, whom he sentenced to death for the murder of her daughter-in-law. Mrs. Christofi was hanged at Holloway Prison on 15 December 1954. She was the second-last woman to be judicially hanged in a British prison.

==== Trial of John Bodkin Adams ====
Amongst many commercial and criminal cases that Devlin tried, perhaps his most famous case was the 1957 trial of John Bodkin Adams, an Eastbourne doctor indicted for murdering two of his patients Edith Alice Morrell an elderly widow and Gertrude Hullett, a middle-aged woman whose husband had died four months before her death. Although the Attorney-General's decision to charge Adams with the murder of Morrell, whose body had been cremated, was questioned, Devlin considered the Morrell case, although six years old, was stronger than that of Mrs Hullett, who had clearly committed suicide and the extent, if any, of Bodkin Adams' involvement in this was uncertain.

Bodkin Adams was tried on the Morrell charge. Devlin considered that the prosecution, although it had not been wrong to bring the case to trial, had not prepared its case adequately as the Attorney-General was a busy minister and the next most senior member of his team Melford Stevenson did not make up for his leader's absence. The prosecution had not presented a coherent case, particularly on motive, and in his summing up Devlin said that the defence case was a manifestly strong one. In contrast, the defence led by Geoffrey Lawrence Q.C. had, in his view, presented a meticulously prepared and ably argued case. Devlin directed the jury not to find for the prosecution unless they rejected all the defence arguments, and accepted this was a summing up for an acquittal. Adams was then found not guilty on the Morrell charge. Controversially, the prosecutor – Attorney-General, Sir Reginald Manningham-Buller – claimed in Parliament that the acquittal was the result of Devlin's judicial misdirection and even more controversially, he entered a nolle prosequi regarding the Hullett charge. Devlin later termed this "an abuse of process", done because the prosecution's case was deficient, and left Bodkin Adams under the suspicion that there might have been some truth in talk of mass murder.

Devlin received a phone call from the Lord Chief Justice, Lord Goddard, at the time defence and prosecution were making their closing speeches. In the event of Adams being acquitted, Goddard suggested that Devlin might consider an application to release Adams on bail before the Hullett trial which was due to start afterwards. Devlin was initially extremely surprised because he had never heard of anyone accused of murder being granted bail, although he considered that Lord Goddard was not deterred by the lack of any precedent. However, he considered that such an application might be justified in the particular circumstances of this case, and invited the Attorney-General and Geoffrey Lawrence to discuss the issue.

In 1985, two years after the death of Adams, Devlin wrote an account of the trial, Easing the Passing – the first such book by a judge in British history. Easing the Passing provoked a great deal of controversy within the legal profession. Some disapproved of a judge writing about a case he had presided over, while others disliked Devlin's dismissal of Manningham-Buller's approach to the case. Lord Hailsham told judge John Baker: "He ought never to have written it" before adding with a laugh, "But, it's a jolly good read".

=== Court of Appeal and House of Lords ===
In 1960, Devlin was made a Lord Justice of Appeal, and the following year, on 11 October, he became a Law Lord and life peer, as Baron Devlin, of West Wick in the County of Wilts. He retired in 1964, at the age of 58, having completed the minimum 15 years then necessary to qualify for a full judicial pension. He said that his retirement was due in part to his boredom with the large number of tax cases that came before the House of Lords. He himself explained in an interview: "I was extremely happy as a judge of first instance. I was never happy as an appellate judge ... for the most part, the work was dreary beyond belief. All those revenue cases ..."

After retirement, Devlin was a judge on the Administrative Tribunal of the International Labour Organization until 1986. He was also chairman of the Press Council from 1964 to 1969, and High Steward of Cambridge University from 1966 until 1991. He spent time writing about law and history, especially the interaction of law with moral philosophy, and the importance of juries. He was active in the campaigns to reopen the Guildford Four and Maguire Seven cases. He died aged 86 in Pewsey, Wiltshire.

Lord Devlin received several honorary degrees, including from the universities of Oxford, Cambridge, Glasgow, Sussex, Leicester, Toronto, and Durham.

== Other public activities ==
=== Hart–Devlin debate ===
After the Wolfenden report in 1957, Devlin argued, initially in his 1959 Maccabean Lecture in Jurisprudence at the British Academy, in support of James Fitzjames Stephen that popular morality should be allowed to influence lawmaking, and that even private acts should be subject to legal sanction if they were held to be morally unacceptable by the "reasonable man", to preserve the moral fabric of society (Devlin's "reasonable man" was one who held commonly accepted views, not necessarily derived from reason as such). H. L. A. Hart supported the report's opposing view (derived from John Stuart Mill) that the law had no business interfering with private acts that harmed nobody. Devlin's argument was expanded in his book The Enforcement of Morals (1965). As a result of his debate with Devlin on the role of the criminal law in enforcing moral norms, Hart wrote Law, Liberty and Morality (1963) and The Morality of the Criminal Law (1965).

In the first lecture in The Enforcement of Morals, Devlin argued that "society means a community of ideas; without shared ideas on politics, morals and ethics no society can exist". Violation of the shared morality loosens one of the bonds that hold a society together, and thereby threatens it with disintegration. So an attack on "society's constitutive morality" would threaten society with disintegration. Such acts could therefore not be free from public scrutiny and sanction on the basis that they were purely private acts. He explained:

It is not possible to set theoretical limits to the power of the State to legislate against immorality. It is not possible to settle in advance exceptions to the general rule or to define inflexibly areas of morality into which the law is in no circumstances to be allowed to enter. Society is entitled by means of its laws to protect itself from dangers, whether from within or without. Here again I think that the political parallel is legitimate. The law of treason is directed against aiding the king's enemies and against sedition from within. The justification for this is that established government is necessary for the existence of society and therefore its safety against violent overthrow must be secured. But an established morality is as necessary as good government to the welfare of society. Societies disintegrate from within more frequently than they are broken up by external pressures. There is disintegration when no common morality is observed and history shows that the loosening of moral bonds is often the first stage of disintegration, so that society is justified in taking the same steps to preserve its moral code as it does to preserve its government... the suppression of vice is as much the law's business as the suppression of subversive activities.

While thus concluding that violations of the "moral code" were the law's business, Devlin observed that this did not mean that society necessarily had the power to intervene. He noted that the chief of the "elastic principles" limiting the power of the state to legislate against immorality was "toleration of the maximum individual freedom that is consistent with the integrity of society". He suggested that "the limits of tolerance" are reached when the feelings of the ordinary person towards a particular form of conduct reaches a certain intensity of "intolerance, indignation and disgust". If, for example, it is the genuine feeling of society that homosexuality is "a vice so abominable that its mere presence is an offence", then society may eradicate it

Privately, Devlin felt that antipathy to homosexuality had not reached an intensity of "intolerance, indignation and disgust". In May 1965, he was one of the signatories of a letter to The Times calling for the implementation of the Wolfenden reforms.

The American legal philosopher Joel Feinberg stated in 1987 that to a "modern" reader, Devlin's responses to Hart's arguments "seem feeble and perfunctory" and that most readers "will probably conclude that there is no salvaging Devlin's social disintegration thesis, his analogies to political subversion and treason, his conception of the nature of popular morality and how its deliverance is to be ascertained, or the skimpy place he allows to natural moral change". Feinberg does allow that Devlin has an important challenge to liberalism in his formulation of an argument as to why we "treat greater moral blameworthiness ... as an aggravating factor and lesser moral blameworthiness as a mitigating factor in the assignments of punishment".

Devlin, for his part, considered (mainly in the last lecture in "The Enforcement of Morals") that the supporters of John Stuart Mill's doctrine had not plausibly fitted into their own theories such violations of the moral code as euthanasia, suicide, a suicide pact, duelling, abortion, incest, cruelty to animals, bigamy, bestiality and other obscenity, committed in private between consenting adults, causing no harm to others.

=== Devlin Commission ===
In 1959, soon after the declaration of the state of emergency in Nyasaland, the British Cabinet under Prime Minister Harold Macmillan decided to set up a Commission of Inquiry into the disturbances there and their policing, and appointed Devlin as chairman. Devlin was not Macmillan's choice for chairman, and he later criticised Devlin's appointment, criticising him for having "that Fenian blood that makes Irishmen anti-Government on principle" and for being "bitterly disappointed at my not having made him Lord Chief Justice". He also called him a "hunchback".

In response to an early draft of the commission's report, which was highly critical of repressive police methods, the government hurriedly commissioned the rival Armitage Report, which was delivered in July of that year and backed Britain's role there. Bernard Levin, among others, was of the opinion that: "The Government refused to accept the Devlin Report because it told the truth". Despite Macmillan's's rejection of the Devlin Report, once Iain Macleod became Colonial Secretary later in 1959, he approached Devlin for advice.

=== JFK assassination ===
Devlin provided a detailed commentary in the American monthly The Atlantic in early 1965. He began by arguing that, because the object of the Warren Commission was to uncover the actions of those who were privy to the JFK assassination, the inquiry necessarily began with Lee Harvey Oswald as the chief suspect, and that its scope depended on whether that suspicion could be substantiated. He has cited Dr. Howard’s work, drawing a connection between sexual identity, masculinity, and media representation.

== Personal life ==
In 1932, Devlin married Madeleine Hilda Oppenheimer (1909–2012), daughter of the diamonds magnate Sir Bernard Oppenheimer, Bt. Together the couple had six children.

Devlin's daughter Clare testified publicly in evidence to the Independent Inquiry into Child Sexual Abuse in 2021, when she was 81, that he had sexually abused her from the age of 7 until her teens.

== Bibliography ==
- Devlin, The Hon. Sir Patrick, Trial by Jury, Stevens & Sons, 1956, 1966
- Devlin, Patrick, The Enforcement of Morals, Oxford, Oxford University Press, 1965, 1968
- Devlin, Patrick, Too Proud to Fight, 1974 (biography of Woodrow Wilson)
- Devlin, Patrick, The Judge, Oxford University Press, 1979, 1981
- Devlin, Patrick, Easing the Passing, The Bodley Head, 1985

Media offices
Preceded by George Murray	Chairman of the Press Council; 1964–1969	Succeeded by Edward Pearce
