= Medical Defence Union =

Legal organisation for healthcare professionals

- Type: Private limited company
- Industry: Professional indemnity
- Founded: 23 October 1885; 140 years ago
- Headquarters: Canary Wharf, London, United Kingdom
- Key people: Dr Matthew Lee (Chief executive); Dr Paul Riordan-Eva (President)
- Number of employees: 420
- Website: themdu.com

The Medical Defence Union (MDU) is one of three major medical defence organisations (MDOs) in the United Kingdom, offering professional medical indemnity for clinical negligence claims and advice provided by medico-legal experts for its members. It is a mutual not for profit organisation.

The MDU was established in 1885 and was the first of its kind in the world. As of January 2022 it has around 200,000 members: doctors, nurses, dentists and other healthcare professionals. The Dental Defence Union (DDU) is the specialist dental division of the MDU.

== History ==
The Medical Defence Union was founded in 1885 following outrage in the medical community over the case of a Dr David Bradley who was wrongly convicted of a charge of assaulting a woman in his surgery. Dr Bradley spent eight months in prison before receiving a full pardon.

By late 1885, there was increasing recognition among the medical profession of the real risk doctors ran in their everyday practice and the poor resources at their disposal to defend themselves. The British Medical Association, for example, to which many of the profession belonged, was not permitted under its constitution to undertake individual medical defence.

In 1885, solicitors Mr Dauney and Mr Cridland, together with Mr Rideal, Mr Clements, Mr Leggatt, Mr Sinyanki and Mr Fitzgerald, signed a memorandum that established the aims and objectives of the newly registered company, the Medical Defence Union. They were the first executive board. The annual subscription cost for members was set at 10 shillings.

== Services ==
The MDU produces a member guide, to explain to members what they might expect:

- Professional indemnity against claims for clinical negligence
- Support and representation with disciplinary and regulatory investigations, coroner's inquests and criminal investigations into members' professional practice
- Medico-legal advice including out of hours emergency helpline 24 hours a day
- Help with responding to patient complaints
- Support when faced with media attention such as help with preparing media statements and responding to the media
- Risk management resources from case reports and online journals
- CPD-accredited education courses helping members reduce the risk of a complaint or claim, and improve their wellbeing and communication skills
- Free access to an app containing news, membership card and proof of membership
- Member discounts on books, courses, online revision resources

== Journals ==
The MDU produces three journals for members which are available on its website and in its member app – the MDU journal, the DDU journal and Student Notes.

== Lobbying ==
The MDU is active in influencing the medico-legal climate on behalf of members. In 2012 the MDU launched its campaign calling on the government to make compensation for injured patients fair and affordable. The campaign was launched in response to spiralling medical negligence bills which have quadrupled in the last decade. According to former chief executive, Dr Christine Tomkins, compensation claims in England are among the highest in the world and the consequence of this on general practice and the wider NHS is catastrophic. MDU also campaigned for state-backed indemnity for GPs in England which was introduced in April 2019 and they have called for healthcare professionals to be exempt from litigation related to the COVID-19 pandemic.

== Regulatory and legal information ==
The Medical Defence Union is authorised and regulated by the Financial Conduct Authority for insurance mediation and consumer credit activities only. The MDU is not an insurance company. The benefits of MDU membership are all discretionary and are subject to the Memorandum and Articles of Association.
