= Death of Edith Alice Morrell =

1950 suspected murder case in England

Edith Alice Morrell (20 June 1869 – 13 November 1950) was a resident of Eastbourne, East Sussex, England, and patient of Dr John Bodkin Adams. Although Adams was acquitted in 1957 of her murder, the question of Adams' role in Morrell's death excited considerable interest at the time and continues to do so. This is partly because of negative pre-trial publicity which remains in the public record, partly because of the several dramatic incidents in the trial and partly as Adams declined to give evidence in his own defence. The trial featured in headlines around the world and was described at the time as "one of the greatest murder trials of all time" and "murder trial of the century". It was also described by the trial judge as unique because "the act of murder" had "to be proved by expert evidence." The trial also established the legal doctrine of double effect, where a doctor giving treatment with the aim of relieving pain may, as an unintentional result, shorten life.

== Background ==
=== Origin of the enquiry ===
Edith Alice Morrell was a wealthy widow who suffered a brain thrombosis (a stroke) on 24 June 1948 while visiting her son in Cheshire. She was partially paralysed and was admitted to a hospital in Neston, Cheshire the following day. After returning to Eastbourne, she was under the care of Dr John Bodkin Adams for two years and four months from July 1948 until her death on 13 November 1950: as she had been attended by a doctor throughout her last illness and as the death was apparently not sudden, violent or unnatural, there was no requirement for an inquest and none was held. Adams, as her medical attendant, certified the cause of death as a "stroke" following a coma that had lasted two hours. Cullen records that, on the day of Mrs Morrell's death, Adams arranged for her cremation and that her ashes were scattered over the English Channel. However, Mrs Morrell had made various wills, and it was her son, Claude, as her sole executor who was obliged to carry out her wishes for her funeral arrangements, not Adams. Adams did complete the medical certificate required for the cremation form, answering "no" to the form's printed question "Have you, so far as you aware, any pecuniary interest in the death of the deceased?", which avoided the necessity of a post-mortem. As Adams was not a beneficiary of Mrs Morrell's final will, as amended by a codicil of 13 September 1950, this answer was in fact correct, although he may have believed he was a beneficiary, as he later told the police.

The Eastbourne police had received an anonymous call, later discovered to be from the music hall performer Leslie Henson who had been working in Dublin at the time, about the unexpected death of his friend Gertrude Hullett on 23 July 1956, while being treated by Adams. Mrs Hullet had been depressed since the death of her husband four months earlier and had been prescribed sodium barbitone and also sodium phenobarbitone to help her to sleep. In the months immediately after her husband's death in March 1956, Mrs Hullett had told Adams of her wish to commit suicide. Her daughter, a close friend (who was also her executor) and her two servants later told the police that they believed that she had taken her own life, and the friend added that he had found the letters in which she had contemplated suicide in April 1956, calling her death a "planned suicide".

No information about Mrs Hullett's possible suicidal intentions had reached Adams' colleague, Dr Harris, who was called after Mrs Hullett was found comatose. He diagnosed a cerebral haemorrhage as most likely cause of her death on hearing that she had complained of a headache and giddiness the previous evening. As the death was unexpected, an inquest was held into Mrs Hullett's death, which ended on 21 August. The inquest concluded that Mrs Hullett had committed suicide, but the coroner questioned Adams' treatment and said in his summing up that it was "extraordinary that the doctor, knowing the past history of the patient" did not "at once suspect barbiturate poisoning".

=== Police involvement ===
Two features of Adams' way of practicing medicine had attracted attention among doctors, nurses and others in Eastbourne: his lavish use of the opiate drugs, heroin and morphia, and his asking wealthy patients for legacies. It was rumoured that the two were not unconnected, and that someone whose duty it was to keep his patients alive should not have a pecuniary interest in their deaths. The circumstances surrounding Mrs Hullett's death, in particular his apparent attempt to disguise that its cause was barbiturate poisoning and his wish to clear a substantial cheque she had given him shortly before her death as rapidly as possible together with these rumours, prompted the Eastbourne police to involve the Metropolitan Police in the investigation.

Instead of having to find a suspect for a known crime, the senior Metropolitan Police officer, Detective Superintendent Herbert Hannam, had a known suspect in Adams but wished to link him to more serious crimes than forging prescriptions, making false statements and mishandling drugs. Devlin suggests that Hannam became fixated on the idea that Adams had murdered many elderly patients for legacies, regarding his receiving a legacy as grounds for suspicion, although Adams was generally only a minor beneficiary in his patient's wills. Hannam's team investigated the wills of 132 of Adams' former patients dating between 1946 and 1956 where he had benefited from a legacy, and prepared a short list with around a dozen names for submission to the prosecuting authorities. The list included Mrs Morrell, Mrs Hullett and two other cases in which evidence had been taken on oath, these being among the cases where Hannam considered he had collected enough evidence for a prosecution. Devlin considered that Mrs Morrell's case, which was chosen by the Attorney-General for prosecution, looked the strongest of Hannam's preferred cases, despite it being six years old, although he noted that some others believed that the Hullet case was stronger.

== The evidence ==
=== Context ===
Murder is a criminal offence under the common law of England and Wales, defined as "the unlawful killing of a reasonable person in being under the King or Queen's peace with malice aforethought express or implied", and matters outside this definition are not murder. Devlin told the jury that, even if they decided that Mrs Morrell did not die a natural death but was killed, there had also to be the intention of killing. He pointed out in his account of the Morrell trial that prosecution could only draw inferences about the intention of an accused person, whereas the defence had the advantage that only the accused could say what had really been in his mind.

The prosecution case, based on the police investigation and outlined in the opening speech of the Attorney-General Sir Reginald Manningham-Buller, was that Adams either administered or instructed others to administer drugs that killed Mrs Morrell with the intention of killing her, and that these drugs were unnecessary as she was not suffering pain and had been semi-comatose for some time before her death. The prosecution added that the likely motive for the killing was he had decided that it was time for Mrs Morrell to die, as he feared her altering her will to his disadvantage. In strict law, the prosecution did not need to show a motive but, if none were advanced, the offence had to be proved by demonstrating beyond doubt how the killing was carried out. Throughout the trial, the prosecution maintained that the motive was a mercenary one, and it did not rely on the possible alternative of euthanasia.

Not only did the alleged manner in which Mrs Morrell met her death have to be proved by expert evidence, the police evidence offered at the trial depended for its accuracy on two statements made by Adams while not under caution in apparently friendly conversation with Hannam. Adams' first statement, that he had administered almost all the dangerous opiate drugs he prescribed for Mrs Morrell himself and that virtually none were left unused at her death, was critical to the prosecution's case on method, but was later contradicted by other evidence. Devlin considers that this admission was made in response to Hannam searching the doctor's house and surgery on 24 November 1956 and at the same time presenting Adams with a list of drugs prescribed for Mrs Morrell between 8 and 12 November 1950, the latter being the day before she died. Had Adams not said that all the drugs had been used, he could have been accused of illicitly hoarding them. Adams' second statement that he had inherited certain items under Mrs Morrell's will, the basis for the case on motive, was also incorrect.

=== Medical evidence ===
After Mrs Morrell had suffered a stroke and was partly paralysed, she was admitted to a cottage hospital in Neston, Cheshire on 25 June 1948. Cullen, whose account is based on the Scotland Yard case files, stated that Adams was already her doctor, that he arrived in Cheshire on 26 June, and on the following day prescribed morphia for the pain. Adams, she claimed, also made special arrangements to take Mrs Morrell back to Eastbourne and gradually increased the dose of morphia and added heroin until she was addicted. However, it was established during the trial that the morphia injections Mrs Morrell received for the nine days she spent in hospital to ease pain and symptoms of "cerebral irritation" and to help her sleep were prescribed by a Doctor Turner of that hospital, not by Adams. On her return to Eastbourne, Mrs Morrell was first cared for at the Esperance Nursing Home before returning home. The Attorney-General's opening speech also stated that Mrs Morrell was transferred to Eastbourne on 5 July 1948, only then becoming one of Adams' patients, and that he first prescribed morphine on 9 July 1948, adding heroin on 21 July. Rather than a gradually increasing dose, between July 1949 and the end of October 1950, the regular dose given was a quarter grain of morphia and one-third grain of heroin.

Four of the nurses that had attended Mrs Morrell had given statements to the police in August and November 1956. Two of these, nurses Stronach and Randall, had suggested to the police that Adams had increased the frequency of injections and the amount of each injection throughout the period they had nursed Mrs Morrell, and that many of the injections Adams gave were of drugs that he took from his bag, which he prepared himself rather than asking the nurses to prepare them, and that they were unaware of their contents. These two nurses repeated these allegations when questioned near the start of the trial by Manningham-Buller, but they were forced to admit under cross examination that it was they and the other two nurses that usually made up the injections to be administered both by them and by Adams, that they had recorded that relatively few injections were brought in already made up by Adams, and also that they had recorded their nature on at least some occasions. Another nurse recalled that these were said to be vitamin injections, and it was also clear that the amounts of opiates injected were constant until September 1950, when another doctor first increased the dosage.

Although Dr Douthwaite, a medical expert witness for the prosecution, claimed that addiction from such doses must have been inevitable, there was no evidence that Mrs Morrell had developed a craving for or addiction to the drugs prescribed. Dr Douthwaite had been a member of the prosecution team since December 1957 when, together with the pathologist Dr Francis Camps, he had assured the Attorney General, Melford Stevenson and the Director of Public Prosecutions that the amounts of opiates prescribed for Mrs Morrell would have been fatal beyond doubt had they been injected, and he also gave evidence to this effect in the Committal hearing. Devlin commented that, having assured the prosecution of the soundness of his opinion, Douthwaite was determined to stand by it in the trial of Dr Adams.

At the time Mrs Morrell left hospital after her stroke, her prognosis was for a life expectation of six months, but she survived for 28 months and, under cross-examination, Dr Douthwaite accepted that it would have been impossible to restore a woman of around 80 years old to her pre-stroke condition, and that the best that could be done was to make her comfortable and help her to sleep. She remained in tolerable health until August 1950 when she began to decline. Dr Douthwaite also accepted that, by the start of November 1950, Mrs Morrell was dying and, had he seen her in October that year, he would only have expected her to survive for a few weeks.

The dosage of opiates was increased from the end of August 1950, but this was initially the action of Adams' partner, Dr Harris. On 9 October 1950 when, after receiving an injection, Mrs Morrell became drowsy and semi-comatose, the nurse that gave it considered that this and other symptoms might have indicated a stroke, and Adams diagnosed it as such. When she revived, she had difficulty speaking and was confused. Although Dr Douthwaite interpreted these symptoms as arising from excessive drug use, both he and Dr Ashby, the other medical expert for the prosecution, agreed that the symptoms were also compatible with this diagnosis of a further stroke. Dr Harman, the defence's medical expert witness, regarded it as a slight stroke as might be expected from her age, having previously had a major stroke and her arteriosclerosis. Cullen quotes a pathologist who reviewed the Morrells case in the 2000s as concluding that the incident of 9 October was not a stroke, partly on the basis of the lack of slurred speech, although the court heard that Mrs Morrell had difficulty speaking after the episode.

The prosecution's opening statement claimed that, at some time not more than two weeks before her death, the amount of opiates given to Mrs Morrell dramatically increased with the intent of ending her life. The Attorney General concentrated on the period from 8 and 12 November 1950 in which he said that Adams had issued prescriptions for 40½ grains of morphia (2624 mg) and 39 grains of heroin (2527 mg), 79½ grains of opiates in total (although Devlin quotes 41 grains of morphia, 37¾ grains of heroin and 78¾ grains in total). One grain under the apothecaries' system of weights is approximately 64.8 milligrams (mg) The respective single-dose lethal or LD-50 figures are in the wide ranges of between 375 and 3750 mg for morphine and 75–375 mg for heroin based on a person of 75 kg.)

Manningham-Buller initially argued that all 79½ grains of these drugs were injected into Mrs Morrell, an amount which was sufficient to kill her despite any tolerance she may have developed, and which could only have been intended to kill. Adams was accused of murdering Mrs Morell by one of two methods, singly or in combination. The first was that, as a result of the amounts of opiates given since January 1950, she was already dying by November that year. The second, the immediate cause of death, was said to be two large injections of an unknown, but presumed lethal, substance prepared by Adams and injected on his instructions into a supposedly unconscious Mrs Morrell on the night of 12 to 13 November 1950, the second an hour before her death. However, on the second day of the trial, the defence produced nurses' notebooks, which showed that smaller quantities of drugs were given to the patient than the prosecution, basing its calculations on Adams' prescriptions, had thought. These recorded that 10½ grains of morphia and 16 grains of heroin were injected in the period, although the prosecution claimed this was an incomplete record. The notebooks also stated that Mrs Morrell was conscious until shortly before her death, and the two injections made the night of 12 to 13 November 1950 were recorded as being of paraldehyde, described as a safe soporific.

The leading Defence counsel Sir Frederick Geoffrey Lawrence, QC asked for a list of all prescriptions for the whole period in which Adams had cared for Mrs Morrell, not just of the dangerous drugs for ten and a half months in 1950 presented by the prosecution. The earlier list showed Adams had prescribed a total of 1,629½ grains of barbiturates; 1,928 grains of Sedormid; 164_{^{11}/_{12}} grains of morphia and 139½ grains of heroin. Lawrence was able to use the complete list, together with the results of his cross examination of the nurses and the prosecution expert witnesses and examination-in-chief of the defence medical expert to describe the decline of an old lady during which Adams had made her comfortable to the best of his ability although using substantial (but not necessarily lethal) amounts of opiate drugs, until her decline accelerated towards a natural death from old age, possibly related to a second stroke. Lawrence also secured an admission from Dr Douthwaite that, in his examination-in-chief, his evidence on symptoms related to possible withdrawal symptoms was in response to instances selected by the Attorney-General that might not have been representative.

In response to the defence's production of the nurses' notebooks, Dr Douthwaite, who had initially suggested 8 November 1950 as the day on which an intent to kill could be first deduced, changed this to 1 November. This was because Adams had completely withdrawn morphia injections on 1 November, later reintroducing the drug on the evening of 5 November, which Dr Douthwaite interpreted as a plan to reduce Mrs Morrell's tolerance to morphia, before it was brought back in increasing doses. His new theory was that, rather than a single injection being lethal, all injections of morphia after its reintroduction on 5 November were potentially lethal, and could only have been intended to be lethal, through a process of accumulation. This was because a moribund patient such as Mrs Morrell could not excrete the build-up of opiates. Dr Douthwaite also claimed that the second, larger, paraldehyde injection on 13 November brought about Mrs Morrell's death more quickly than the opiates alone would have done. Dr Douthwaite had previously accepted the defence argument that the withdrawal of morphia was Adams experimenting with variations in drugging, and in cross-examination, Lawrence suggested that his new idea was not based on generally accepted ideas. When questioned by Devlin, Dr Douthwaite accepted that it would be essential to his accumulation theory that Adams knew that opiates would accumulate, but that a doctor with Adams' anaesthetist's qualifications should have known this. Dr Douthwaite also admitted in cross-examination that his evidence at the committal hearing was given without knowledge of her treatment in Neston, was based on the medication Mrs Morrell had received from January 1950 only, and on the incorrect assumption that she had been in a coma for the last three or four days of her life.

Dr Douthwaite's new theory was not accepted by his colleague, Dr Ashby, who did not consider then the withdrawal of morphia sinister and also accepted Mrs Morrell may have been in pain or considerable discomfort through arthritis exacerbated by being bedridden, rather than pain-free, as Manningham-Buller had claimed. Dr Ashby also said under cross-examination that he was not prepared to say whether Adams' instructions to the nurses were of a murderous nature. Dr Harman, for the defence, also disagreed with Dr Douthwaite's theories on accumulation, the withdrawal and reintroduction of morphia and the effects of paraldehyde. The Attorney-General continued to focus on 8 November 1950 as the critical date and on Adams' unguarded admissions that he had used almost all the drugs he had prescribed as showing the nurses' records were incomplete. Devlin commented that, by this point, a conviction seemed to him unlikely because the medical evidence had been inconclusive and the motive, the acceleration of a paltry legacy, ludicrous. A guilty verdict would have indicated that the jury had been unable to resist the prejudicial pre-trial publicity.

=== Possible motive ===
The prosecution claimed that Adams killed Mrs Morrell because he feared she would alter her will to his disadvantage, although the only firm, non-contingent legacy he was ever awarded was a chest of silver cutlery worth £276. This was found in Adams' house, still wrapped in tissue paper in 1956, some six years after Mrs Morrell's death. Adams believed that he had been promised Mrs Morrell's Rolls-Royce and possibly other items, and the prosecution continued to claim that this belief, rather than the actual contents of the wills, was proof of his motive.

Mrs Morrell left a gross estate of £157,000 and made eight cash bequests of between £300 and £1,000 to her household, all greater in value than the silver cutlery that Adams eventually received, and six charitable donations of £100 to £1,000. Cullen claims that in some of the wills she made, Adams was bequeathed large sums of money and her Rolls-Royce Silver Ghost. This was said to be worth £1,500, although it was 19 years old. Cullen's statements on legacies appear incorrect as, in Mrs Morrell's will of 5 August 1950, Adams was only awarded the silver cutlery outright, with a contingent right to the car and a Jacobean court cupboard in the unlikely event that Mrs Morrell's son predeceased her. A codicil of 13 September 1950 cut Adams out of her will completely. Despite the last codicil, Mrs Morrell's son gave Adams the aged Rolls-Royce and the chest of silver cutlery.

=== Summing up and verdict ===
Devlin's summing up involved one legal direction which established the double effect principle, that where restoring a patient to health is no longer possible, a doctor may lawfully give treatment with the aim of relieving pain and suffering which, as an unintentional result, shortens life. The second legal direction was that the jury should not conclude that any more drugs were administered to Mrs Morrell than shown in the nurses' notebooks. Devlin's reasoning was that Adams' admission to the police that he had administered all of his last prescription was part of a longer admission that they were administered because Mrs Morrell was in terrible agony: if she was in agony, or Adams thought she was, even mistakenly, there would be no guilty intent and no murder. The prosecution had to make use of the whole admission, including the pain that Adams had said Mrs Morrell was suffering, or none of it. Further, he advised the jury that, if their deliberations they considered the discrepancy between the amounts prescribed and the amounts administered as shown in the nurses' notebooks, and wondered if there were a channel by which they were improperly disappearing, they should recall that the drugs were not securely stored and that two of the nurses had lied in the witness box about whether they were securely locked up.

He advised the jury that in Mrs Morrell's case there were three essential points to decide:

"Members of the jury there are three points, the Crown must convince you that she did not die from natural causes, second you must be convinced that there was an act of killing, and thirdly, if there was such an act, was it with the intent of killing?"

Devlin also indicated the main defence argument was that the whole case against Dr. Adams was mere suspicion and that, "...the case for the defence seems to me to be a manifestly strong one". He noted that the majority of those that had followed the case in the Times Law Reports expected an acquittal. The jury returned a Not Guilty verdict after deliberating for only forty-six minutes.

== Double effect ==
Lawrence and Dr Harman had stated that Mrs Morrell had died as natural a death as was possible, eased by necessary drugs, although Adams' instruction to the nurses to give sufficient medication to "keep her under" might suggest some hastening of that event. The court did not ignore the suggestion that Adams had hastened Mrs Morrell's death, and Devlin clarified for the jury and medical profession how far the law allowed the orthodox doctor to go in easing the passing of the dying. Mahar regards Adam's statements to Hannam on his treatment of Mrs Morrell as a reflection of his views on end-of-life care: Adams never denied giving his patients large doses of opiates, but denied murder. Although Adams' use of opiates was extreme, other doctors also used them to ease the passing of the dying, and Dr. Douthwaite for the prosecution accepted that a physician might knowingly give fatal doses of pain-relieving drugs to a terminally ill patient, adding it was not his business to say whether it was murder. Devlin's directions to the jury confirmed that whether or not Adam's treatment of Mrs Morrell was designed to give her comfort was a medical issue and not a legal one.

Between the 1930s and 1960s, the medical profession failed to prioritise treatments designed to relieve the suffering of dying patients. Doctors were aware that hastening a patient's death was illegal, and few were prepared to advocate the use of opiates in palliative care openly, but a 1948 article observed that 'purely medical treatment' for the dying could 'almost be written in one word: morphine' and a British Medical Association meeting heard about the use of heroin to induce euphoria and oblivion and relieve pain. Adams' successful and lucrative medical practice, despite his limited competence, may be explained by the care, including end-of-life care, he gave his patients. This included a lavish use of heroin and morphia that may have constituted mercy killing, but he probably cared for his patients in the way he thought best. An editorial in a medical journal following the case suggested that the publicity it caused might hamper medical discretion, claiming the use of opiates in terminal cases was essential.

Devlin's formulation of the double effect principle has been approved by the House of Lords and generally by many other legal and medical commentators, as it is in line with the legal doctrine of causation, that the disease which was beyond treatment was the true cause of death. After the Adams trial, the Director of Public Prosecutions stated that he agreed with Devlin's direction to the jury on this point. Devlin clarified the principle in a lecture in 1962, saying that a medical treatment designed to relieve the pains of death was undoubtedly a proper treatment. However, several professionals in biomedical law have suggested that Devlin's proposition that a doctor whose primary intention is to relieve pain, even if life is incidentally shortened, is not guilty of murder provides a special defence in law for doctors only, and may be an example of the reluctance of courts to convict doctors. In a contrary view, Devlin himself argued that this was not a special defence for doctors, because the underlying disease, and not medical treatment, was the true cause of death, although a minority of critics have argued that, if a treatment hastens death, that treatment is the immediate cause of death, while accepting the principle of double effect on the basis on the basis that a doctor might have no guilty intention.

More recently, the double effect principle figured in two British murder trials, both of were decided in line with Devlin's 1962 clarification of the principle. In 1990, Dr Cox, a rheumatologist was convicted of the murder of a terminally ill patient who had begged him to kill her. After pain killers had proved ineffective, he injected her with twice the lethal dose of potassium chloride and she died within minutes. Cox claimed that he had intended to relieve suffering, however, as potassium chloride had no analgesic properties, injecting it could not have been regarded as a treatment to alleviate pain. In the same year, Dr Lodwig gave a terminal cancer patient an injection of lignocaine and potassium chloride which proved rapidly fatal. However, as lignocaine is a pain-killer and as it was claimed that using potassium chloride with other pain killers could accelerate their analgesic effect, it could be argued that their combination could be considered as a medical treatment. Although Dr Lodwig was charged with murder, the prosecution offered no evidence at his trial.

== Apportioning blame ==
No-one involved in the case had anything but praise for Lawrence's highly professional defence, and criticism of Devlin was limited to Manningham-Buller's claim in parliament that Devlin had misdirected the jury, by telling them to disregard any possible injections not recorded in the nurses' notebooks. However, various parties to the case blamed each other for the prosecution's failure to secure a conviction, on the assumption that Adams should have been convicted. The apparent fairness of the trial is often discussed in terms of this supposed failure, rather than in terms of the generally prejudicial pretrial press coverage and the prosecution introducing probably inadmissible evidence in the committal hearings. Although Devlin thought that Lawrence's concerns that Adams would not receive a fair trial were overstated, another legal writer has questioned whether the legal system of 1957 would have been capable of giving Adams a fair trial, if the lost nurses' notebooks had not come into the hands of the defence.

The responsibilities of those involved in the investigation and prosecution of the case need to be considered. At the time of the Adams case in 1957, the police's role was to investigate reports of crimes, determine if one had been committed and arrest a suspect. Police practice was to make a decision on whether there was a case to prosecute early in the inquiry, and then to find evidence to support a prosecution. It was then, as now, the job of the Director of Public Prosecutions to review the police dossier, to decide whether it was appropriate to prosecute and to appoint counsel to conduct the prosecution. It was also then normal for the Director to refer very serious cases to the Attorney-General or Solicitor-General, a practice that no longer exists. However, for most of the 20th century including 1957, the Director of Public Prosecutions by convention limited consideration of the guilt of the accused based on the evidence collected by the police to applying the so-called fifty per cent rule, to confirm there was a reasonable chance of a conviction, and did not extend to questioning that evidence, as is the case in more recent times. It was not the function of prosecution counsel to decide on guilt or innocence but to plead their brief.

=== Police investigation ===
At an early stage in the investigation, Hannam believed he had found Adams' modus operandi: that he first made his victims drug addicts, then influenced them to change their wills in his favour and finally gave them a lethal dose of opiates. Hannam's report on his investigation of October 1956 includes his strong suspicion of narcotic poisoning in several cases and Hannam confided to a reporter at this time that he was convinced that Adams was a serial killer who had killed fourteen people.

Between August and October 1956, Hannam collected a significant number of witness statements, mainly from the nurses and relatives of Adams' deceased former patients who claimed that these had been heavily drugged by Adams, were injected with unknown substances and had become comatose or unresponsive. By mid October 1956, Hannam had drafted his initial report for his Chief Superintendent. The Chief Superintendent was initially dismissive of the case Hannam presented, considering it was speculative, based on rumour and could not be proved; the Commander of 'C' Division agreed and the Director of Public Prosecutions asked Hannam to obtain more evidence. In January 1957, Hannam obtained further statements from Nurse Stronach and Nurse Randal, nurses in the Morrell case which were more specific, and more damaging to Adams, claiming in particular that they were generally unaware of what he was injecting.

The statements gathered both before and after Hannam's initial report have often been quoted in support of Adams' guilt, but in the Morrell case the nurses' own notebooks showed that the testimony in their statements were at best misremembered, at worst untrue. In the course of cross-examination, one nurse was forced to confront the complete disparity between her witness statement describing a semi-conscious woman receiving unknown injections and an entirely different account of a fully awake woman with a healthy appetite receiving injections whose contents were recorded, as shown by her notebook. A second nurse was told that her claim not to remember a conversation of the previous day did not fit with her statement claiming to remember events six years before, and a third effectively repudiated her witness statement in favour of her notebooks. Devlin noted that the witness statements were taken by Hannam and his team and used to prepare the brief, and that doing so accurately may have been beyond Hannam's powers.

Adams told the police that, to use his own term, he was in the practice of "easing the passing", something probably fairly common in the medical practice, but not discussed outside it in 1957. Devlin considered that, if Adams genuinely held the honest belief that he was easing suffering, this would not constitute murder. However, Hannam had already made up his mind, preferring the more dramatic interpretation of drugging patients into submission for monetary gain. During Adams' trial, the theory behind the case prepared by the police was thrown into confusion by the nurse's notebooks, and it was beyond the capability of the prosecution counsel to make a calm reappraisal of the question of guilt while the trial continued, so they ignored euthanasia as an alternative. Matters were not improved when the evidence of the expert witnesses was conflicting and, in the case of Dr Douthwaite, self-contradictory. Once the police had presented their case dossier, no-one, whether Director of Public Prosecutions, counsel for the prosecution or expert witnesses, felt it their duty to decide on whether Adams committed the exact crime he was accused of or to reassess the evidence rationally. The Attorney-General can be criticised for the way he presented the case against Adams, but not for its evidential basis, a police matter.

After a later review of the completed case file by the Director of Public Prosecutions, Hannam and Hewett met the Director, the Attorney General, Melford Stevenson, the pathologist Dr Francis Camps and Dr Douthwaite on 18 December 1956. After Drs Camps and Douthwaite had assured the Attorney General and the two other lawyers present that the amounts of opiates prescribed for Mrs Morrell were fatal beyond doubt, Manningham-Buller instructed the police to arrest Adams. Dr Douthwaite apparently accepted Hannam's theory, as he stated in evidence-in-chief, that morphia and heroine would have turned Mrs Morrell into an addict and given Adams complete ascendancy over her, and any anger she had shown was a withdrawal symptom, not a sign of independence. Under cross examination he was confronted with evidence that two doctors besides Adams who had seen Mrs Morrell had also prescribed opiates, whereas Dr Douthwaite had never examined her.

Devlin criticises Hannam and his team for overlooking the nurses' notebooks and not establishing whether or not the opiate drugs were kept securely. As the question of how the notebooks came into the defence's hands is disputed, the first criticism may be misplaced, but he does suggest that the investigation was carried out hastily.

The Metropolitan Police conducted an internal investigation into Hannam's conduct during his investigation, and also studied the relationship between Hannam and the press in depth. The results were never made public, but a year later Hannam's police career ended, and he was later employed in a private security agency.

=== Prosecution ===
Rodney Hallworth records the criticism made in the 1980s by Charles Hewett, Hannam's Detective Sergeant in 1956, of the selection of the Morrell case to prosecute. Cullen describes it as the weakest of the four cases selected by Hannam, and implies the decision was solely Manningham-Buller's. Robins, who consulted the same police files in the National Archives as Cullen did, as well as material not seen by Cullen, reports that the decision was made when all the prosecution team and police were present, and only after Dr Camps, a pathologist, and Dr Douthwaite, a recognised authority on opiates, had assured the Attorney General and two other lawyers present that the amounts of opiates prescribed for Mrs Morrell would undoubtedly have been fatal. Dr Douthwaite also initially endorsed Hannam's theory that morphia and heroin would have turned Mrs Morrell into an addict and given Adams complete ascendancy over her.

Hewett's quoted view that there was no evidence to present before a jury, as Mrs Morrell's body had been cremated shows a misunderstanding of the principle of corpus delicti, and his assertion that traces of drugs found in exhumed remains of two other patients of Adams made better cases against Adams lacks confirmation. The advanced state of decomposition of the first corpse prevented the establishment either a definite cause of death or the presence of drugs, and the examination of the second concluded the causes of death were coronary thrombosis and bronchopneumonia, and the small amounts of morphine and barbiturates found were insufficient to draw any firm conclusion. Devlin regarded none of the cases mentioned by Hallworth as equally strong as the Morrell case, despite it being six years old, that the exhumations and subsequent post-mortems yielded nothing of interest but provoked further press rumours and, in an investigation initially into Mrs Hullett's death covering a ten-year period, the police were unable to find a better case than the Morrell one.

An alternative, and more valid, criticism of the prosecution than Hewett's is that it prepared and presented its case badly. Its case relied heavily on police evidence and the testimony of expert witnesses, neither of which had been thoroughly tested in the pretrial period. This caused the prosecution embarrassment when the nurses' notebooks were produced, over the destruction of the case based on prescriptions and when Dr Douthwaite's change of opinion while in the witness box. Melford Stevenson's conduct at the committal proceedings, which led to the public airing of probably inadmissible evidence that was dropped before the trial and created much sensational press coverage and the Attorney-General's failure to adapt his case to the evidence presented by the defence but to continue to rely on Adams' admissions did not show them to be well prepared and thoroughly professional.

=== Interference ===
The only contemporaneously recorded instance of an intervention, rather than interference, concerned Lord Goddard, the Lord Chief Justice who had proposed to Devlin that, in the event that Adams was acquitted in the Morrell case, he should be granted bail before the second charge, that of Mrs Hullett's death, was heard. What was apparently a concession to the defence has been plausibly suggested as a warning to the prosecution of strong judicial displeasure over the Attorney-General's plan to proceed with the second indictment. Devlin discussed this with Manningham-Buller only after the jury retired and, although only Devlin, both counsel and the Clerk of Court were present, accounts of this meeting circulated at the time. Lord Goddard had earlier expressed his unhappiness over the second indictment, which was against precedent. Devlin, who spoke to the Director of Public Prosecutions about the trial, excludes him from the list of those who were active in the prosecution and who firmly believed in Adams' guilt, and refers to a post-trial House of Commons debate of 1 May 1957 in which the Attorney General denied "malicious rumours" that the Director had disapproved of prosecution. As with Lord Goddard's intervention, this was known of in 1957.

At the time of the trial, it was believed that the police had overlooked the nurses' notebooks, which were later found by the defence team in Adams's surgery. This differs from the police records: in the list of exhibits for the Committal Hearing given to the DPP's office, the notes are mentioned. Cullen suggests that the Attorney General must therefore have known of their existence and according to her, this shows "that there was a will at the highest of levels to undermine the case against Dr Adams".

There is no documentary evidence and no first-hand accounts in support of such interference. In roughly contemporaneous issues that government ministers would have wished to have hushed-up, firstly, the clandestine meetings of French and British officials with Israeli representatives during the Suez Crisis that were not officially documented, but were disclosed by Anthony Nutting, who took part, and the existence of the secret Protocol of Sèvres was disclosed in a biography of Anthony Eden twenty years before the documents were officially declassified in 2006. Lady Dorothy Macmillan's affair from the 1930s onwards with Robert Boothby, who may have fathered her fourth child, was known in their circle, if not reported in the press or Macmillan's official biography.

== Published accounts ==
A great many newspaper and journal articles and book sections or chapters, but fewer book length accounts, have been published about Adams and his trial. There have been three peaks of output, in 1956 and 1957, mainly before the trial, in the mid 1980s after Adams' death and before and after 2000, following the discovery of Harold Shipman's activities. The great majority represent Adams as a serial murderer, but few are based on their author investigating the evidence rather than recycling previous accounts. Of those more detailed accounts published before 2003, only one represents Adams as an undoubted serial killer.

=== Pre-2003 ===
None of Adams, Manningham-Buller, Lawrence, Hannam or Melford Stevenson published detailed accounts of the investigation and trial. Manningham-Buller complained in a parliamentary debate soon after the verdict that Devlin had wrongly rejected his submission that Adams' admission that he had used virtually all the prescriptions supplied should have been accepted, believing that the acquittal was due to judicial misdirection. Melford Stevenson was reported by Hallworth to have criticised the right to silence in the 1980s as having enabled Adams to escape punishment, saying "I firmly believe justice is not served by the present law. It should be possible for the prosecution to directly examine an accused...." Melford Stevenson was previously criticised in the Court of Appeal for directing in 1964 that a jury might draw an inference of guilt from a defendant's silence in another case.

The only detailed account published before the deaths of all but Melford Stevenson by someone who had attended the Adams trial and witnessed the demeanor of the participants was by Sybille Bedford. Her narrative account of the trial includes a verbatim record of the important speeches and verbal exchanges. She treats the trial process as fallible, and although accepting the correctness of the verdict, expresses disappointment that Adams' silence left a gap in the narrative of the trial. This regret that Adams did not speak is echoed in Devlin's more legalistic comment that a "not guilty" verdict does not usually mean the accused has established their innocence, but that there is doubt about guilt. Adams had been accused of three murders, indicted on two counts and had a trial and been found not guilty of one of these, but by widely publicised innuendo, he had been implicated in many more. The only way that Adams could have challenged these suspicions would have been to give evidence to explain his actions, and to accept being cross-examined.

Two journalists also published accounts of the investigation and trial. Percy Hoskins of the Daily Express was one of the few journalists prepared to apply the presumption of innocence to Adams and to criticise the prejudicial gossip other newspapers published, amounting to trial by newspaper before the actual trial. Hoskins, who interviewed Adams before, and at length after, the trial, celebrates Lawrence's forensic skill and sincerity, and considered the verdict to be correct on the evidence presented. Rodney Hallworth's account is based mainly on police information, including conversations with Hannam before and at the time of the trial in 1956 and 1957, and repeats allegations published then, with additional reportage from the 1980s, mainly provided by Charles Hewett, Hannam's Detective Sergeant in 1956. Hewitt is quoted as blaming the Attorney General for prosecuting the Morrell indictment instead of other charges which Hewett claims were stronger, and for failing to secure Adams' conviction, while also condemning Adams for avoiding cross-examination. Hallworth himself was convinced that Adams was guilty of several murders and escaped justice because of the Attorney General's mishandling of the case.

=== Post-2003 ===
In 2003, permission was given to access the files of the police investigation, and three authors have published accounts which used this material. The first, Cullen, makes no criticism of the police case and seeks to demonstrate that Adams was a murderer who probably had more victims than Dr. Harold Shipman. The second, Robins, who consulted the same police files, but also Devlin's trial papers, records the internal criticisms of Hannam's methods, as does Mahar, the final author. The main use that Cullen and Robins make of the police files relates to the witness statements obtained in other cases that the police investigated. Neither comments on the wide discrepancies between such witness statements in the Morrell case and the nurses notebooks, except for Robin's comment that the Attorney General could have made more of the evidence of Dr Harris that some of his visits to her were not recorded. Mahar's main concern was to explore the disconnection between the ideas of doctors and lawyers on end-of-life palliative care before the Adams case.

== Summary ==
Mrs Morrell's death may be plausibly linked to Nurse Randall's impromptu comment that Mrs Morrell had told her that Adams had promised her she would not suffer at the end and to Adams' admissions of 26 November and 19 December 1956 that Mrs Morrell was dying, that she was in terrible agony, that she wanted to die, and that easing the passing of a dying person was not wicked. The medical experts for both defence and prosecution acknowledged that Mrs Morrell was dying by November 1950 and that a second stroke was a possible cause, although the prosecution experts preferred the lengthy use of opiates as the most likely cause. From the date of the suspected second stroke, the daily injections of opiates increased, and on 9 November, the nurses were told to give Mrs Morrell heroin injections whenever necessary, hourly if need be, to keep her from becoming restless, but by the last 24 hours of her life, this was insufficient to give her comfort. By the time Nurse Randall gave the last two injections, she considered Mrs Morrell was on the verge of death. The content of those last injections of 12 to 13 November 1950 is disputed, but it seems probable that they were the immediate cause of her death.

In line with Devlin's legal direction on the double effect principle, as Mrs Morrell was dying, restoring her to health was no longer possible, so Adams could lawfully give her treatment to relieve pain and suffering even if that shortened her life. Although this might cover treatment from the start of November 1950 up to the last 24 hours of her life, it might have left the last two injections in doubt at the time of his trial. However, Devlin's 1962 clarification of the principle, that a medical treatment designed to relieve the pains of death was a proper treatment, would apply to these final injections also.

== Sources ==
- F. Beckett, (2006). "MacMillan". London, Haus Publishing.
- S. Bedford, (1958). "The Best We Can Do". London, Penguin. ISBN 0-14011-557-9.
- The British Medical Journal (1957). "Trial of Dr. J. Bodkin Adams". No. 5021 (March. 30, 1957) pp. 771–773.
- The British Medical Journal (1957). "Trial of Dr. J. Bodkin Adams: Expert Evidence". No. 5022 (6 Apr 1957) pp. 828–834.
- The British Medical Journal (1957). "Trial of Dr. J. Bodkin Adams: Judges Summing-up". No. 5024 (20 Apr 1957) pp. 954–955.
- L. Blom-Cooper Q.C., and T. Morris, (2004). "With Malice Aforethought": A Study of the Crime and Punishment for Homicide. Oxford, Hart Publishing. ISBN 978-1-84113-485-7.
- K. Dolin, (2002). "The Case of Dr. John Bodkin Adams: A 'Notable' Trial and its Narratives", in Real: Yearbook of Research in English and American Literature, Vol. 18.
- P. Cullen, (2006). "A Stranger in Blood": The Case Files on Dr John Bodkin Adams. London, Elliott & Thompson. ISBN 1-90402-719-9.
- P. Devlin, (1985). "Easing the passing": The trial of Doctor John Bodkin Adams. London, The Bodley Head.ISBN 0-57113-993-0.
- R. Hallworth and M. Williams, (1983). "Where there's a will..." The sensational life of Dr John Bodkin Adams. Jersey, Capstan Press. ISBN 0-94679-700-5.
- P. Hoskins, (1984). "Two men were acquitted": The trial and acquittal of Doctor John Bodkin Adams. London, Secker & Warburg ISBN 0-43620-161-5.
- D. J. McBarnet, (1981). Conviction: Law, the State and the Construction of Justice. London, Palgrave.ISBN 978-0-33325-536-0.
- C. Mahar, (2012). "Easing the Passing": R v Adams and Terminal Care in Post-war Britain. Social History of Medicine Vol. 28, No. 1.
- A. Nutting, (1967). "No End of a Lesson": Story of Suez. London, Constable. ISBN 978-0-09452-430-9.
- M. Otlowski,(2004). "Voluntary Euthanasia and the Common Law". Oxford University Press. ISBN 0-19829-868-4.
- H. Prins, (2008). Coke v. Bumble – comments on some aspects of unlawful killing and its disposal. Medicine, Science and the Law, Vol 48. No, 1.
- J. Robins, (2013). "The Curious Habits of Dr Adams": A 1950s Murder Mystery. London, John Murray.ISBN 978-1-84854-470-3.
- R. Rhodes James, (1986). "Anthony Eden". London, Weidenfeld & Nicolson. ISBN 978-0-09452-430-9.
- A. W. B. Simpson, (1986). "The Trial of Dr. John Bodkin Adams". Michigan Law Review, Vol. 84, No. 4/5.
- G. Williams (2007). "Intention and Causation in Medical Non-Killing The impact of criminal law concepts on euthanasia and assisted suicide". London, Routledge-Cavendish.
