= Death of Gertrude Hullett =

British woman possibly murdered by John Bodkin Adams

Gertrude "Bobby" Hullett (1906 – 23 July 1956), a resident of Eastbourne, East Sussex, England, was a patient of Dr John Bodkin Adams, who was indicted for her murder but not brought to trial for it. Adams was tried in 1957 for the murder of Edith Alice Morrell, and the prosecution intended to proceed with the Hullett indictment as a second prosecution that could follow the Morrell case in certain circumstances, although it did not bring the case to trial following the verdict in the Morrell trial.

The Morrell trial featured in headlines around the world and was described at the time as "one of the greatest murder trials of all time" and "murder trial of the century". However, the Hullett charge was dropped by the Attorney General after Adams was acquitted of murdering Mrs Morrell through a legal device that was later described by the trial judge as "an abuse of process", used to conceal the deficiencies of the prosecution case.

== Husband's death ==
On 14 March 1956, Mrs Hullett's husband Alfred John (Jack) Hullett died at age 71 and left Adams, who had treated him for some years, £500 in his will out of an estate of £94,644. In November 1955, Jack Hullett had been diagnosed by Adams with a bowel obstruction that was probably cancerous, and likely to be fatal, as was later confirmed by a consultant surgeon who operated on Hullett. Something went wrong in the initial operation and Hullett was left in considerable pain, despite a second operation. Hullett's pain continued after his release from hospital, so Adams prescribed high doses of opiate painkillers and barbiturates. In March 1956, Hullett was examined by a heart specialist, who considered that Hullett had been suffering from a heart condition from childhood, and that it was getting worse. Considering his deteriorating heart condition and the likelihood that the cancer would return, this specialist expected that Hullett would die within the following few months, and that he might die at any time. On 13 March, he had severe chest pains consistent with a heart attack, a diagnosis supported by the nurse that was present, who also recalled that Adams had given him an injection she believed was a highly concentrated form of morphine at 10.30pm. Hullett died eight hours later.

Shortly after Hullett's death, Adams went to a chemist's shop to get a 10cc hypodermic morphine solution (which contained 5 grains of morphine) in the name of Mr Hullett, and asked for the prescription to be back-dated to the previous day. When the police investigated the case, they presumed that this was a ruse to cover up that Adams had given Mr Hullett morphine which was assumed to be from his own private supplies. However, the police suspicion that Adams had injected Hullett with a lethal dose of 5 grains of morphine at 10.30pm on 13 March was disproved at the committal proceedings when the prosecution's medical expert witness admitted in cross examination that, as Mr Hullett had received a morphine injection about eight hours before his death but had woken and talked to a nurse half an hour before his death, the injection could not have been as much as 5 grains and the death was probably from coronary thrombosis, as Adams had certified.

== Her treatment ==
Gertrude Hullett, 50, became depressed after Jack's death, and Adams prescribed sodium barbitone and sodium phenobarbitone for her. Several of her friends and her household staff later told the police that she appeared to be drugged, and claimed that they had urged her to leave Eastbourne and Adams' care. Cullen reports that, over a period of 80 days, 1,512 grains of the former and 6¼ grains of the latter were prescribed, and she called this a large dose. However, Adams told the Coroner's inquest that it was his practice to give Mrs Hullett two 7½ grain sleeping tablets daily at first, which experts later confirmed was a normal dose, and that he later reduced this to two 6 grain, then to two 5 grain, tablets. In the months immediately after her husband's death in March 1956, Mrs Hullett had told Adams of her wish to commit suicide, and letters found after her death show that she had seriously contemplated suicide in April 1956. Her friends who saw her in the days before her death described her mental state then as being more cheerful and natural than before, one likening her to "a person who has come to a decision about something". Mrs Hullett's daughter, a close friend and two servants later stated to the police that they believed that Mrs Hullett had taken her own life, the friend that had found the letters in which she had contemplated suicide calling it a "planned suicide". Her friend, actor and film director Leslie Henson, who anonymously contacted the police about the death, was working in Dublin around the time of Mrs Hullett's death.

On 17 July 1956, Mrs Hullett wrote out a cheque for Adams in the amount of £1,000; to pay for an MG car which her husband had promised to buy him. Adams' treatment of this cheque has raised speculation: he paid the cheque into his account the next day, and on being told that it would clear by the 21st, asked for it to be specially cleared, so that it would arrive in his account the following day. His bank account at the time was not low on funds, it contained £12,069. Furthermore, special clearance was usually given in cases where a cheque might bounce, yet Mrs Hullett was one of the richest residents in Eastbourne. If she had died before the cheque cleared through, it could have been stopped by her executors, although they would have required due cause to do so.

On 19 July, Mrs Hullett is thought to have taken an overdose, and was found the next morning in a coma. Adams was unavailable and a colleague, Dr Harris, attended her until Adams arrived later in the day. Despite her possible suicidal tendencies, Dr Harris diagnosed a cerebral haemorrhage as most likely cause of her death on hearing that she had complained of a headache and giddiness the previous evening. As Dr Harris was also told that Mrs Hullett had been prescribed sleeping pills, he searched for an empty bottle, but found none. Adams arrived later and Harris asked about a possible barbiturate overdose, which Adams said was impossible, and he did not mention to his colleague during their discussion that Mrs Hullett had suffered from depression. The two doctors decided a cerebral hemorrhage was most likely, due partly to contracted pupils. This, however, is could also be a symptom of morphine or barbiturate poisoning. Moreover, her breathing was shallow, typical of an overdose-induced coma.

On 21 July, a pathologist by the name of Dr Shera was called in to take a spinal fluid sample, and immediately asked if her stomach contents should be examined in case of narcotic poisoning, but Adams and Harris both opposed this. After Shera left, Adams visited another colleague, Dr Cook, at the Princess Alice Hospital in Eastbourne and asked about the treatment for barbiturate poisoning. He was told to give doses of 10 cc of a relatively new antidote Megimide every five minutes, and was given 100 cc to use. The recommended dose in the instructions was 100 cc to 200 cc. Dr Cook also told him to put Hullett on an intravenous drip. Adams did not follow these suggestions.

The next morning, at 8:30 a.m., Adams called the coroner to make an appointment for a private post-mortem. The coroner asked when the patient had died and Adams said she had not yet. Dr Harris visited again that day and Adams still made no mention of potential barbiturate poisoning. When Harris left, Adams administered a single injection of 10 cc of the Megimide. Mrs Hullett developed broncho-pneumonia and on the 23rd at 6:00 a.m., Adams gave Mrs Hullett oxygen. She died at 7:23 a.m. on the 23rd. The results of a urine sample taken on the 21st were received after Mrs Hullett's death, on the 24th. It showed she had 115 grains of sodium barbitone in her body, twice the fatal dose. Hullett's friend, Leslie Henson, knew that Mrs Hullett's husband had died four months earlier and that the two both saw Adams as their doctor. He telephoned the Eastbourne police anonymously to warn them of the fears he and his wife had, which was one of the reasons that an investigation was started. Henson, who was in Dublin when Mrs Hullett died, claimed that she was turning into a drug addict, and that the pills she had been prescribed had changed her personality and caused her death. However, the coroner who had, in that official capacity, called the Eastbourne Chief Constable earlier was the more immediate cause of the police investigation.

Later, before Adams' trial in 1957, the Director of Public Prosecutions's office compiled a table of patients who had been treated with Megimide and Daptazole for barbiturate poisoning between May 1955 and July 1956 at Saint Mary's Hospital in Eastbourne, where Adams had worked one day a week as an anaesthetist. Six of those patients had been treated in the first half of 1956, before Hullett's death. All but one had been put on a drip, and several had taken a higher dose than Mrs Hullett. It was presumed by the DPP, therefore, that Adams would have heard of these cases and the use of Megimide.

== Will ==
In a will dated 14 July, Mrs Hullett had left Adams her 1954 Rolls-Royce Silver Dawn, worth at least £2,900. Adams changed the car's distinctive vanity registration (AJH532) on 8 December and then sold it on the 13th. He was arrested six days later on 19 December.

== Inquest ==
As Mrs Hullett's death was unexpected, an inquest was opened on 23 July and adjourned pending a post-mortem: after the hearing was resumed, it ended on 21 August. The coroner asked Adams why there had been no intravenous drip, to which Adams answered, "She wasn't perspiring. She had lost no fluids." A nurse, however, described Mrs Hullett as "sweating a good deal" from the 20th till her death. When asked if he read the instructions for the Megimide, Adams answered, "No, I didn't." The coroner also described the use of oxygen as "a mere gesture". In his summing up, the coroner then said that it was "extraordinary that the doctor, knowing the past history of the patient" did not "at once suspect barbiturate poisoning". He described Adams's 10 cc dose of Megimide as another "mere gesture".

The inquest concluded that Mrs Hullett committed suicide: in Cullen's opinion, the inquest should have been adjourned until the police investigation had been concluded. However, the coroner had asked Superintendent Hannam in open court whether the police wished him to adjourn the inquest, to which Hannam replied that he had no application to make. In his summing up, the coroner offered the jury four possible verdicts: an accidental overdose, suicide either with or without Mrs Hullett having a disturbed mind or an open verdict. He advised them that there was no evidence that anyone administered the overdose to her and did not encourage a finding that it was accidental, pointing them toward a suicide verdict. Although Cullen claims that the jury were directed not to find that Mrs Hullett died as a result of Adams's criminal negligence, it is more correct to say that the coroner discouraged this finding without making any direction, saying that they could only be concerned with negligence so gross that it fell just short of murder, not an error of judgement or carelessness.

== Trial ==
Adams was prosecuted for the murder of Edith Alice Morrell and found not guilty in 1957. Although the Attorney General Sir Reginald Manningham-Buller, had filed a second indictment in the case of Mrs Hullett, contrary to the normal rule in 1957 that only a single murder indictment should be filed,

Adams was never tried for this but, at the committal hearing, Melford Stevenson, who led the crown's case there, put the case that Adams either administered a fatal dose of barbiturates to Mrs Hullett or gave her a fatal dose to take herself, which was murder. He had made the explicit claim that Adam's instructions to specially clear Mrs Hullett's cheque two days before her death showed that he knew she would be die very soon; as Mrs Morrell was wealthy and Adams had ample cash in his bank accounts, there was no other reason for his wanting special clearing. However, Devlin questioned how this could transform a case that seemed obviously to be suicide into one of murder. Stevenson also made reference to the deaths of Mrs Hullett and her husband as evidence of critical similarities to the death of Mrs Morrell. Devlin considered the police case that there were similarities in deaths of Mrs Morrell and Mrs Hullett was not well founded, as the claimed similarities were not sufficiently distinctive. Had the police found two recent cases similar to Mrs Hullett's, where a patient had died of an overdose of sleeping pills prescribed by Adams, that might have shown system, but the police had found no such cases.

After Adams' acquittal in the Morrell case, the expectation was that the Attorney General would offer no evidence in the case and the judge would direct the jury to return a not guilty verdict. To general surprise, Manningham-Buller, entered a plea of nolle prosequi in the Hullett case. The presiding judge Patrick Devlin said that nolle prosequi had never before been used to prevent an accused person from being acquitted, and described it as "an abuse of process" which left Adams under the suspicion that there might have been something in the talk of mass murder.

== Sources ==
- Cullen, Pamela V. (2006). A Stranger in Blood: The Case Files on Dr John Bodkin Adams. London: Elliott & Thompson. ISBN 1-904027-19-9.
- Devlin, Patrick (1985). Easing the passing: The trial of Doctor John Bodkin Adams. The Bodley Head. ISBN 0-571-13993-0.
- Robins, Jane (2013). The Curious Habits of Dr Adams: A 1950s Murder Mystery. London: John Murray. ISBN 978-1-84854-470-3.
