= Francis Camps =

British pathologist

Francis Edward Camps (28 June 1905 – 8 July 1972) was an English pathologist notable for his work on the cases of serial killer John Christie and suspected serial killer John Bodkin Adams.

== Early life and training ==
Camps was born in Teddington, Middlesex, the son of Percy William Leopold Camps (1878–1956), a general practitioner and surgeon. Camps was educated at Marlborough College, followed by a medical degree at Guy's Hospital. He went on to postgraduate studies at the Liverpool School of Tropical Medicine and the Neuchâtel University, Switzerland.

== Career ==
In 1935, Camps decided to specialise in pathology, and took up the post of pathologist at the Chelmsford and Essex Hospital. He was professor of Forensic Medicine at the London Hospital Medical College since 1963 (Reader 1954–63). President of the International Association of Forensic Scientists, 1963–66. Honorary Consultant to the Army in Forensic Medicine after 1964. He was a Past-President of the British Association and Secretary General, British Academy of Forensic Sciences. Professor Camps was the author of many papers on forensic medicine, and of Practical Forensic Medicine.

== Medico-legal work ==
He worked on, amongst others, the John Bodkin Adams case in 1956 where he identified 163 suspicious deaths and was an expert witness in the trial the following year. However, Adams was acquitted of murdering one of his patients, owing to lack of evidence of motive, among other uncertainties.

== 10 Rillington Place ==
Camps gave evidence during the trial of John Christie in 1953, having produced a detailed and comprehensive report on the many bodies found at 10 Rillington Place. The bodies were well preserved and so much relevant information could be gleaned from their condition. His report showed a consistent pattern of attack by Christie, most of the intact victims having been sexually molested and strangled. Beryl and Geraldine Evans had alone been strangled, and their bodies were exhumed to be re-examined for Christie's trial.

The skeletal remains of Christie's older victims buried in the back garden at Rillington Place (a human thigh bone visibly propped up a small fence) provided less information, although it proved possible to identify the women involved. There could be little doubt that Christie had murdered them all, that Timothy Evans was innocent, and that he had been wrongly executed, although it took many years to establish the truth of the matter. The forensic and witness evidence pointed to a serious miscarriage of justice, although it was contested by a series of lawyers and politicians well after the events.

However, several authors, such as Ludovic Kennedy, pointed out the many contradictions and errors in the Crown's case, and the innocence of Evans is now widely accepted, both by public, experts and by the Crown itself. The case was the most prominent of a series of miscarriages which ultimately led to the abolition of capital punishment for murder in England, Wales and Scotland in 1965.

== Other cases ==
He reported on numerous deaths from carbon monoxide poisoning, accounting for nearly half of all suicides in Britain in the 1950s when coal gas was widely available in many homes until in the 1960s it was progressively replaced by the less toxic natural gas: the suicide rate in Britain fell by almost a third and has not risen since.

His analysis of the problem of identifying the gas in bodies after death was published posthumously in his autobiography, together with other of his cases such as the Rhyl mummy and the Colchester taxi cab murder. In the same book, he also examined the forensic evidence involving Jack the Ripper.

== Death ==
Camps died in 1972 from a perforated gastric ulcer, for which he refused to have surgery performed.

== Tribute ==
The author Earl Stanley Gardner dedicated one of his novels, The Case of the Duplicate Daughter, to Camps in appreciation of his professional acumen. A short dedication note by the author can be found at the beginning of the novel.

== Bibliography ==
- Practical Forensic Medicine, Francis E Camps, Hutchinson (1971).
- Camps on crime, Francis E Camps, David & Charles (1973).
- Francis Camps: famous case histories of the celebrated pathologist by Jackson, Robert; London, 1975
- Camps, F. E. (1953). Medical & Scientific Investigations in the Christie Case. Medical Publications.

== See also ==
- Sir Bernard Spilsbury
- Keith Simpson
- Pathology
- List of pathologists
