= Merthyr Vale =

Merthyr Vale: Welsh: Ynysowen
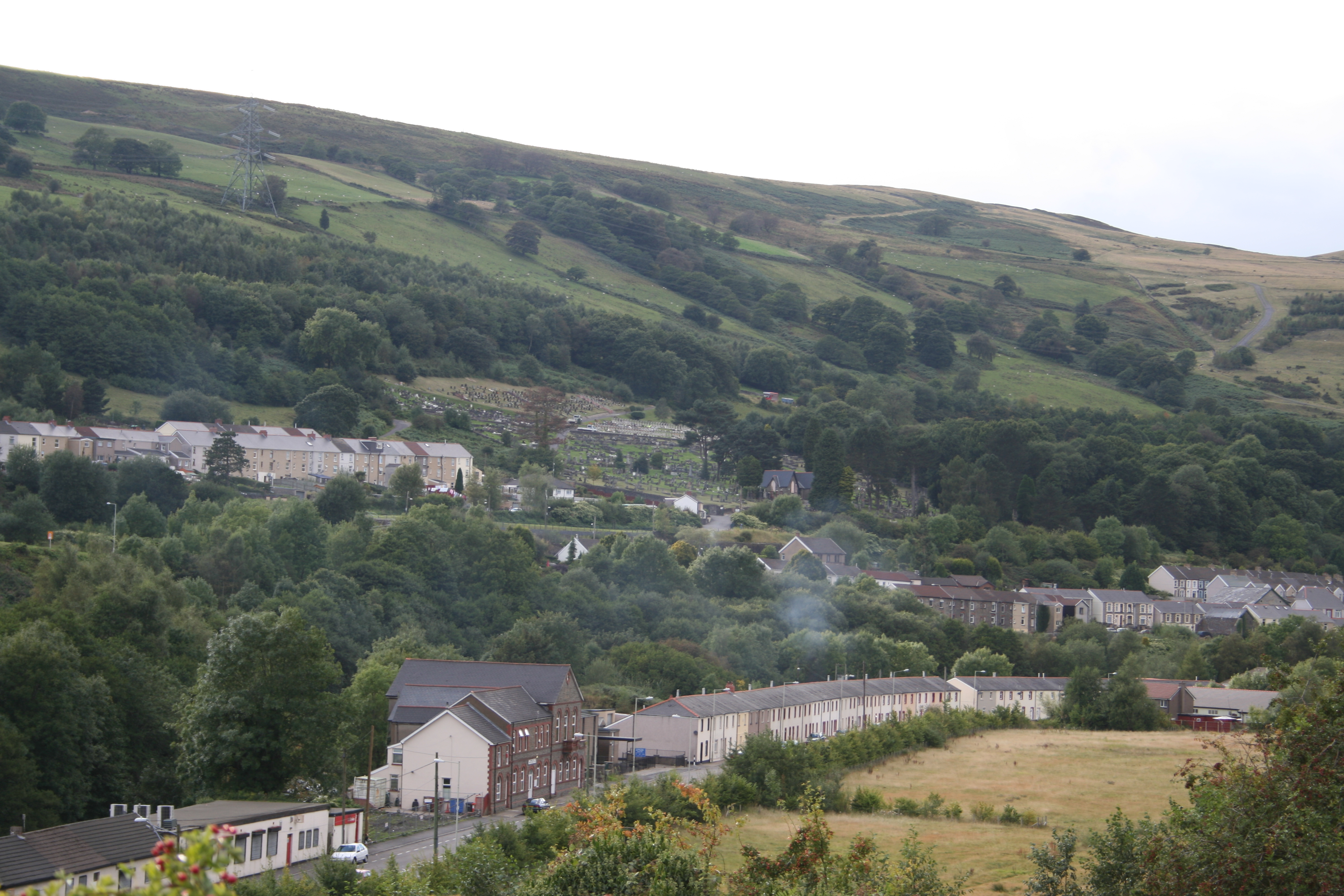

- Location within Merthyr Tydfil
- Population: 3,831 (2011)
- Community: Merthyr Vale
- Principal area: Merthyr Tydfil
- Preserved county: Mid Glamorgan
- Country: Wales
- Sovereign state: United Kingdom
- Post town: Merthyr Tydfil
- Postcode district: CF48
- Dialling code: 01443
- Police: South Wales
- Fire: South Wales
- Ambulance: Welsh
- UK Parliament: Merthyr Tydfil and Aberdare
- Senedd Cymru – Welsh Parliament: Merthyr Tydfil and Rhymney
- List of places UK Wales Merthyr Tydfil 51.69111°N 3.33960°W Map of the community

Merthyr Vale (Welsh: Ynysowen or Ynyswen) is a linear village and community in the Welsh county borough of Merthyr Tydfil. Lying on the A4054 road it is on the east bank of the River Taff.

The community includes the villages of Aberfan on the opposite side of the Taff, Mount Pleasant and the village of Merthyr Vale itself.

== History ==
The area was referred to and written as Ynys Owen as early as 1630, noting that the narrow valley was heavily wooded, with various traditional longhouse (tyddyn) farms marking out the rural territories. Ynys Owen, which translates from Welsh to English as Owain's riverside meadow, has been claimed by some possibly to commemorate Owain Glyndŵr, whose followers were involved in an uprising around 1400.

There had been small scale coal extraction at Danyderi and Perthygleision, but in 1869 John Nixon (mining engineer) started development of the Taff Colliery, later to be known as the Merthyr Vale Colliery. The village immediately grew up around the shaft development, as did the later communities of Aberfan, Nixonville and Mount Pleasant. Completed in 1875, when the first commercial coal was brought up, there was a celebration called in the local Windsor Hotel.

As the colliery was not the first developed in the area, and as colliery developers and owners were known to generally restrict spending on surrounding communities in which they housed their workers, Merthyr Tydfil council insisted on Merthyr Vale being developed with both adequate sanitation, as well as community infrastructure. Resultant planning regulations stipulated that the parish had effective sanitary and water supplies from the beginning.

== Village churches, schools, social buildings ==
For the religious faiths chapels and churches for: Zion, Baptist, Calfaria, Welsh Baptist Bethel, Wesleyan Methodist, Disgwylfa, Calvinist Methodist and Trinity, Presbyterian denominations.
The local parish church of St Mary the Virgin, was built alongside the river Taff next to the Colliery in 1926. It was a time of austerity, coinciding with the General Strike. Despite the deprivations of the time, and having very little money, a small group of parishioners encouraged by the Reverend Evans made plans with the help of the colliery engineer. They were fortunate to acquire the dressed stones from an old disused pump house at Pontyrhun Bridge in Troedyrhiw owned by the Glamorganshire Canal. But they would have to dismantle and transport it themselves. A church in Aberdare offered the people of Merthyr Vale a pulpit. Finally, after much backbreaking work and many willing helpers in the community, the church was finally consecrated on Saturday 11 December 1926 by Joshua Pritchard Hughes, Bishop of Llandaff. The Church was demolished in 1967 due to subsidence in the colliery and a new Anglican Church of St Mary and Holy Innocents was built in Nixonville in 1970.

In 1908 the first Roman Catholic church dedicated to St Benedict was officially opened by John Hedley (bishop), an attractive stone building, the entrance of which was later surrounded by a fine avenue of trees. In 1926 a new parish priest, Fr Arthur Jordan arrived and confronted with the task of building a new church because the original had been condemned due to subsidence. The new St Benedict's, was purchased with the help of the Powell Dyffryn Colliery, and officially opened on 18 December 1932, by Francis Mostyn (archbishop of Cardiff). Before these churches were built the growing Catholic community attended Mass in Mountain Ash and in St Mary's, Merthyr Tydfil. Both journeys involved a walk of several miles. From 1892, Merthyr Vale was served by a Benedictine priest from St. Mary's, Merthyr Tydfil who said Mass, at first, in 26 Taff Street and later at the Rechabite Hall Crescent Street.

Zion and Calfaria merged in 1974 to form the modern Baptist Church at Nixonville, which contains the first fibre-glass baptistry built in Wales.

The former Merthyr Vale School was built in 1879, while the Mount Pleasant School dates from 1912, it was closed in 2010. Merthyr Vale railway station opened in 1883. The Gordon Lennox Constitutional Club was built in 1901, by the proprietor of the Brown-Lennox Engineering Company in Pontypridd, also the President of the East Glamorgan Conservative.

The village developed sufficiently to create The Merthyr Vale Silver Prize Band - which won the Gwent Eisteddfod in 1905 and 1905, under conductor G. H. Thomas.

== World War Two ==
On 8 June 1940 1,600 evacuees arrived by train at Merthyr Tydfil from Deal and Folkestone in Kent. These were young children, clutching dolls and gas masks, accompanied by their teachers, welcomed by the civic dignitaries. Later the same evening about 210 children from Deal arrived at the Gordon-Lennox Hall, Merthyr Vale. The local police Inspector was in charge and together with the village clergy, St John Ambulance Brigade, and teachers from local schools were tasked with placing the children in their new homes.

Then on 7 July 1941, while on a training exercise from No. 53 Operational Training Unit, two Royal Canadian Air Force Supermarine Spitfires collided over the village. The first aircraft (X4024) of Sgt Gerald Fenwick Manuel (R/69888), 25, from Halifax, Nova Scotia, crashed into the home of the Cox family, at 1 South View Terrace (close to Mount Pleasant School) claiming the lives of Doreen Cox, 33, and her two daughters Phyllis, 14, and Doreen, 3. Husband James Cox, who was a shift worker at a munitions factory and was asleep in the house at the time of the crash, was thrown to safety; their three boys, Donald, Thomas and Len, were out playing. Neighbours tried to rescue the family - who had just returned from a shopping trip - but the heat from the fire was too intense.
The second aircraft (X4607) of Sgt Lois "Curly" Goldberg (R/56185), 27, from Montreal, crashed into a field in Mount Pleasant, Treharris.
The bodies of Sgt Manuel and the deceased family members were buried two days later in Ffrwd Cemetery, Merthyr Tydfil, while the body of Sgt Goldberg was interred in the Jewish cemetery at Cefn-coed-y-cymmer.

== 21st century ==
The Coventry Playground was built in 1972 on the site of the old Merthyr Vale School, with the monies collected by the people of Coventry. The playground was officially opened by the mayor of Coventry but closed to children many years ago and now is Coventry Gardens, a small housing estate with 11 bungalows.

Following the 1941 air crashes, in 2007 a mural was painted by local school children and unveiled by the Canadian High Commissioner shortly afterwards on the same site, while there is an ongoing campaign by the Cox family for a permanent memorial.

In 2009, 100 homes in two streets of Merthyr Vale were demolished to make way for a redevelopment on the site of the old Merthyr Vale Colliery. It was to include 230 new homes, a new school, two shops, a restaurant and offices. After the first phase of the project – Ynysowen primary school – was completed, the school received its first pupils in 2010. Project Riverside was being jointly funded by the Welsh Government and Merthyr Tydfil County Borough Council, who were to invest £8.2 million in the scheme.

== Mount View ==
Mount View, which translates from English to Welsh as Trem Y Mynydd, is a small village within Merthyr Vale, located at the bottom of Mount Pleasant

== In culture ==
The village appears in Richard Fleischer's 1971 film, a British crime drama 10 Rillington Place starring Richard Attenborough and John Hurt. As Timothy Evans (Hurt) comes back to Wales, various scenes then shot inside the main village are seen. The locations include: Merthyr Vale Station, Coronation Place Aberfan, and Cardiff. The film dramatises the case of British serial killer John Christie (murderer), who committed many of his crimes in the titular Notting Hill (London) terraced house, and the miscarriage of justice involving his neighbour Timothy Evans, played by John Hurt who won a BAFTA Award nomination for Best Supporting Actor for his portrayal. Timothy Evans was a Welshman born in Merthyr Tydfil wrongfully convicted and hanged for the murder of his wife and infant daughter at their residence at 10 Rillington Place in January 1950; after new evidence emerged, he was granted a posthumous pardon.

== Notable people ==
- Idloes Owen (1894–1954), founder of the Welsh National Opera, was born in Merthyr Vale, 30 Crescent Street.
- Trefor Jenkins (1932–2025), human geneticist and medical ethicist in South Africa, was born in Merthyr Vale.
- Anthony Windham Jones (1879–1959) although born in Llanelli died in Merthyr Vale, a Welsh international rugby union half back who played club rugby for Cardiff and Mountain Ash.
