= Malcolm Morris =

English barrister

Malcolm John Morris
- Born: 1913; Bromley, Kent
- Died: October 1972 (aged 58–59); Bullingdon, Oxfordshire
- Occupation: Barrister
- Spouse: Betty Rene Russ

Malcolm John Morris QC (1913–October 1972) was an English barrister. He was involved in many high-profile cases, such as the prosecutions of suspected serial killer John Bodkin Adams and pop star Mick Jagger, and the defence of Timothy Evans.

== Career ==
Morris was called to the bar by the Inner Temple in 1937. He was known for his particularly beautiful speaking voice which he used to great effect with juries. In 1950 Morris, aided by Evelyn Russell, defended Timothy Evans, a poorly educated van driver who was charged with the murder of his baby. Evans was the neighbour of serial killer John Christie, and kept insisting it was Christie who did it. Morris thought it unlikely that they would succeed in pinning it on the neighbour but Evans told him that this was what had happened and this was what he wanted to say. Morris accepted the instructions as he was obliged to do and prepared his case with professional care but not with any deep personal conviction. He also told Evans that if that was to be his defence he would have to go into the witness box and give evidence about it on oath. Evans told him he was perfectly willing to do so. The atmosphere in court was very favourable to Christie who was the main witness for the Crown and Evans's testimony was summarily dismissed by the prosecution and the judge Mr Justice Lewis who was seriously ill and died a few weeks after the trial. Evans was found guilty after the jury were out for just over forty minutes and hanged but it is now generally accepted by the public, experts and the Crown itself that Christie murdered Beryl and Geraldine Evans. Evans was one of the first recognised victims of a miscarriage of justice. The case was important for leading to the abolition of capital punishment in the UK in 1965.

In 1957 Morris was junior prosecutor in Attorney General Reginald Manningham-Buller's team that prosecuted suspected serial killer Dr John Bodkin Adams. Adams was accused of killing Edith Alice Morrell but was acquitted. He was thought, however, by Home Office pathologist Francis Camps to have killed 163 of his wealthy patients. Historian Pamela Cullen has claimed that the case against Adams was hindered by a lack of care and attention on the part of the prosecution and by meddling from the government of the time, who for political reasons did not want a doctor to be hanged for murder - the sentence that a conviction would have received. She has claimed that vital evidence was handed to the defence in order for the prosecution to pretend to be caught unprepared during the trial. Two years later in 1959, Morris was promoted to Queen's Counsel.

In 1965 he was made a Master of the Bench. Two years later in 1967 Morris prosecuted Mick Jagger and Keith Richards on possession of illegal drugs charges. The case highlighted the differences in British society between the generations, such as when Morris asked Richards whether he would agree that, "in the ordinary course of events, you would expect a young woman to be embarrassed if she had nothing on but a fur rug in the presence of eight men, two of whom were hangers-on and another a Moroccan servant?" Richards replied "Not at all". Morris pressed him, "You regard that, do you, as quite normal?", to which the answer came, "We are not old men [...] We’re not worried about petty morals." Morris won the case and both defendants received relatively harsh sentences, but Jagger's 3-month sentence was later reduced on appeal to a 12-month probation, and Richards' 12-month imprisonment was overturned completely. In Christopher Sandford's biography of Jagger, the pair's lawyer Michael Havers claimed he was told by Morris before the appeal that Morris had had "direct instructions" from above not to oppose the appeal. The sentences had attracted a lot of criticism in the press.

In 1971 Morris defended armed robber John McVicar, on trial for escaping from prison while already serving a 23-year sentence. 3 more years were added onto the sentence, but McVicar was glad that it hadn't been upgraded to a life sentence. A chapter ("Plea") in McVicar's autobiography McVicar by Himself is written as a letter to Morris, persuading Morris to believe in his client's worth. At the time, Morris was already in poor health.

== Personal life ==
Morris was born in Bromley, Kent. He married Betty Rene Russ in July 1949, who worked for MI5 and MI6. They had two children, Rupert (born 9 December 1951) and Laura (born 31 August 1953).

Morris died in Bullingdon, Oxfordshire in October 1972, aged 59.

== In popular culture ==
Morris was played by Robert Hardy in 10 Rillington Place, a 1971 film based on the Evans/Christie case.
