= Brabin =

Brabin is the surname of the following people:

- Charles Brabin (1882–1957), American film director and screenwriter
- Daniel Brabin (1913–1975), judge of the High Court of England and Wales
- Gary Brabin (born 1970), English football player and manager
- Tracy Brabin (born 1961), British politician, actress, and television writer
