= 10 Rillington Place =

1971 British film by Richard Fleischer

- British theatrical release poster
- Directed by: Richard Fleischer
- Screenplay by: Clive Exton
- Based on: Ten Rillington Place by Ludovic Kennedy
- Produced by: Leslie Linder; Martin Ransohoff
- Starring: Richard Attenborough; Judy Geeson; John Hurt
- Cinematography: Denys Coop
- Edited by: Ernest Walter
- Music by: John Dankworth
- Production companies: Filmways Pictures; Genesis Productions
- Distributed by: Columbia Pictures
- Release date: 28 January 1971
- Running time: 111 minutes
- Country: United Kingdom
- Language: English

10 Rillington Place is a 1971 British crime drama horror film (Note: Numerous sources describe the film as a hybrid of a crime drama as well as a horror film.) directed by Richard Fleischer and starring Richard Attenborough, Judy Geeson, and John Hurt. The film dramatises the case of British serial killer John Christie, who committed many of his crimes in the London terraced house of the title, and the miscarriage of justice involving his neighbour Timothy Evans. It was adapted by Clive Exton from the 1961 nonfiction book Ten Rillington Place by Ludovic Kennedy (who also acted as technical advisor to the production) and produced by Leslie Linder and Martin Ransohoff.

Previous attempts at making a film based on Christie's crimes were blocked by the British Board of Film Classification until clearance was ultimately given to Linder and director Fleischer in 1970. Principal photography began in the spring of 1970 on location in London. While most of the location shooting occurred in a flat near the actual site of the crimes, Attenborough did film a scene inside 10 Rillington Place, which was demolished shortly after the film was completed.

Distributed by Columbia Pictures, 10 Rillington Place premiered in London on 28 January 1971, and received mixed reviews from film critics, although it has since undergone critical reappraisal. Hurt was nominated for a BAFTA Award for Best Supporting Actor for his portrayal of Evans.

== Plot ==
In 1944, John Christie murders an acquaintance called Muriel Eady. He lures her to his West London flat at 10 Rillington Place by promising to cure her bronchitis with a "special mixture", then incapacitates her with town gas, strangles her with a piece of rope, and (it is implied) has sex with her corpse. He buries her in his flat block's communal garden, and whilst digging the grave he accidentally uncovers Ruth Fuerst, one of his previous victims.

In 1949, Tim Evans and his wife Beryl move into 10 Rillington Place with their infant daughter Geraldine. Beryl is pregnant again and attempts a medical abortion. When she informs Tim, they have a violent argument, which Christie breaks up. Soon after, Christie offers to help Beryl terminate the pregnancy. He pretends to read a medical textbook one day in an effort to convince Tim of his expertise. Tim is essentially illiterate and cannot tell that Christie is lying. The Evanses agree to let Christie perform the procedure.

Christie occupies his wife, Ethel, by sending her to his place of work with some paperwork. He grabs his killing tools, makes a cup of tea, and heads upstairs to Beryl. He is interrupted by a couple of builders who arrive to renovate the outbuilding. He lets them in, and when he sees they are well-occupied, pours a new cup of tea and heads back upstairs. Beryl has a violent reaction to the gas, and Christie punches her in the face to knock her out. He then strangles and sexually assaults her.

When Tim returns, Christie tells him that Beryl died of complications from the procedure. Tim wants to go to the police, but Christie convinces him that he will be seen as an accessory. Christie suggests that Tim leave town that night, while Christie disposes of Beryl's body. He promises that he will place the baby in the care of a childless couple from East Acton. Tim reluctantly agrees, and leaves the house in the middle of the night. Christie then strangles Geraldine with a tie.

Tim hides out with his aunt and uncle Con and Vi Lynch in Merthyr Tydfil, pretending he is in town on business. He claims that Beryl and the baby are visiting her family in Brighton. The Lynches send a letter to Beryl's father, who sends a telegram in response to say that he has not seen Beryl in months. When confronted by his relatives, Tim pretends Beryl ran away with a rich man and then visits the local police station. He confesses to disposing of Beryl's body in the sewer after the botched abortion. Three London police officers lift the manhole, but do not find Beryl's body. A search of 10 Rillington Place eventually uncovers the bodies of Beryl and the baby in the washroom, where Christie hid them.

When Tim is brought back to London, he is charged with the murders of his wife and daughter. In shock, and despondent over the news, he confesses to both crimes, though he is guilty of neither. During his trial, Christie is a key witness. Tim's defence attacks Christie's credibility by revealing that he has a history of theft and violence. Nevertheless, Tim is found guilty and is hanged.

Two years after the trial, Ethel begins to fear her husband, and informs Christie she will move out to stay with relatives. When he begs her not to leave him, Ethel implies that he should be in prison. Christie murders her that night and hides her body under the floorboards in their front room. Later, he meets a woman suffering from a migraine in a café. He pretends to be an ex-doctor and promises her a cure. He is next seen putting fresh wallpaper on a wall in his kitchen; it is implied that he has hidden the woman's body in the space behind the wall.

In 1953, Christie is living in a dosshouse. Meanwhile, new tenant Beresford Brown is moving into the Christies' flat. There is an awful smell in the kitchen and Brown peels off the wallpaper to find a space behind the wall, where he finds three of Christie's victims. Soon afterwards, Christie is noticed by a police officer in Putney and arrested. The film ends with an intertitle explaining that Christie was hanged and Tim was posthumously pardoned and reinterred in consecrated ground.

== Cast ==
- Richard Attenborough as John Christie
- Judy Geeson as Beryl Evans
- John Hurt as Timothy Evans
- Pat Heywood as Ethel Christie
- Isobel Black as Alice
- Robert Hardy as Malcolm Morris
- Geoffrey Chater as Christmas Humphreys
- André Morell as Wilfrid Lewis
- Sam Kydd as furniture dealer
- Jimmy Gardner as Con Lynch
- Gabrielle Daye as Vi Lynch
- Rudolph Walker as Beresford Brown
- Phyllis MacMahon as Muriel Eady
- Edwin Brown as hangman
- Reg Lye as tramp

== Production ==
=== Development ===
The British Board of Film Classification had blocked the making of a film based on the murders committed by John Christie for over ten years. The film was developed initially by screenwriter Sean Graham, alongside producer Leslie Linder and American director Richard Fleischer, who had previously directed the crime film The Boston Strangler (1968). Graham eventually dropped out of the project after he felt that Fleischer was flouting his "sensitive" approach to the material, with Fleischer stating that he wanted to make a hard-edged "horror film to end all horror films... [Fleischer] wants to go for it. There is no censorship any more in America." Commenting on his aesthetic approach, Fleischer said: "Show too much and you run the risk of gratuitous sensationalism; show too little and falsify the nature of the murderer. After all, it's easy to feel compassion for Christie or the Boston Strangler if you never see what they actually did."

The film was ultimately produced by Linder and Martin Ransohoff.

=== Basis ===
The film relies on the same argument advanced by Ludovic Kennedy that Timothy Evans was innocent of the murders and was framed by Christie. That argument was accepted by the Crown and Evans was officially pardoned by Home Secretary Roy Jenkins in 1966. The case is one of the first major miscarriages of justice known to have occurred in the immediate postwar period. Most of the script, narrative and character development of it was drawn up in the 1960s.

In 1954, the year after Christie's execution, Rillington Place in Notting Hill, West London, was renamed Ruston Close, but number 10 continued to be occupied. In 1958, a Mr. King moved into the flat the Christies had occupied. King is reported to have said he was often woken in the night sensing an oppressive, dark energy of a woman in the room; he bought incense in an attempt to cleanse number 10.

Producer Leslie Linder called the movie "an anti capital punishment film" and was not worried by polls that said the majority of British people wanted to bring hanging back. Richard Fleischer said "The film we are making is basically a very exciting suspense-drama about characters who fascinate and elements that horrify. We shall make no attempt to analyse Christie to try to explain why he became a psychotic strangler. We shall just let the facts speak for themselves."

=== Casting ===
Richard Attenborough, who played Christie in the film, spoke of his reluctance to accept the role: "I do not like playing the part, but I accepted it at once without seeing the script. I have never felt so totally involved in any part as this. It is a most devastating statement on capital punishment." Attenborough was offered the lead by Leslie Linder while preparing his film Young Winston. Attenborough wrote "It's difficult to describe Leslie Linder. As Johnny Redway's ex-partner, he was an agent, and he was also a restaurateur: at the same time he was an impresario, a film producer, a keep-fit fiend, and a man bursting with creative ideas." Attenborough was attracted by the role in part because there was a push to reintroduce the death penalty. John Hurt called his part as Tim Evans "the best role I'd done".

=== Filming ===
Filming began May 1970. In the 2016 documentary Being Beryl on the Indicator Blu-ray release, actress Judy Geeson revealed that the family living at number 10 in 1970 were too afraid to move out temporarily in fear of not being allowed back, so exterior scenes and window shots were filmed at the nearby number 7. Only Attenborough filmed inside no.10 (the scene where London police officers lift the manhole in the street and Christie is seen looking out of the bay window).

Interior sets were used at Shepperton Studios in London. The house and street were demolished shortly after the film was completed and the area redeveloped beyond all recognition. A small communal garden occupies a spot directly in front of the former number 10 location, whilst flats built in the late 1970s cover its exact location, (the apartments were built on where the kitchen, wash house and back garden of number 10 once stood). Residents living there have often reported problems with the electrics going wrong.

Filming also took place in the village of Merthyr Vale, the real life hometown of Timothy Evans. The pub scenes were filmed at the Victoria Hotel on Burdett Road in East London. The pub was subsequently demolished as part of the redevelopment of the area in 1972–1973.

Hangman Albert Pierrepoint, who had hanged both Evans and Christie, served as an uncredited technical advisor on the film to ensure the authenticity of the hanging scene. Hitherto, judicial hangings had been portrayed as long, drawn-out procedures in which a tearful, repentant condemned man or woman would be slowly led to a gallows and invited to say their last words; now, for the first time, the public saw the reality in which a hanging was actually carried out in silence in a matter of a few seconds.

== Release ==
Following a sneak preview in Harrow on 13 November 1970, 10 Rillington Place had its world premiere on 28 January 1971, distributed by Columbia Pictures. The film received an X certificate in the United Kingdom. The film premiered in the United States on 12 May 1971, opening in New York City.

=== Home media ===
RCA/Columbia Pictures Home Video released a VHS in the United Kingdom in late 1982, following with a United States release in 1986.

In 2010, Sony Pictures Home Entertainment made the film available on DVD on-demand through their Sony Screen Classics By Request online store.Twilight Time released a limited edition Blu-ray in the United States on 15 March 2016. In the United Kingdom, Indicator Films released a Blu-ray and DVD set on 28 November 2016.

== Reception ==
=== Critical response ===
10 Rillington Place opened to mixed reviews from British film critics. The Monthly Film Bulletin wrote: "10 Rillington Place focuses exclusively on Christie and Evans; and its schizophrenic approach (sober documentation side by side with confected suspense) affects the overall style rather than the construction. Clive Exton's screenplay – based on Ludovic Kennedy's book – is neat and believable ...but Fleischer's direction is rather less discreet. ...Attenborough's Christie is the work of a clever actor subduing his natural ebullience, but it remains essentially actorish – and worse, borrows most of its mannerisms from an earlier Attenborough performance, the henpecked psychopath of Séance on a Wet Afternoon. By contrast, Hurt makes Evans pathetically red-eyed and hangdog, and compels total belief; his breakdown on discovering Beryl's death is done with sufficient intensity to make his later surrender and false confession completely plausible as an attempt to give his misery some definition. It is a performance that only emphasises how much better the film could have been without the Victorian trappings."

Critic Derek Malcolm described the film as "methodical reconstruction of one of the most macabre murder cases of the century," ultimately feeling that it failed to function for purposes of entertainment or serious analysis.

Variety's critic wrote: "Richard Fleischer has turned out an authenticated documentary-feature which is an absorbing and disturbing picture. But the film has the serious flaw of not even attempting to probe the reasons that turned a man into a monstrous pervert." Praise went to John Hurt for his "remarkably subtle and fascinating performance as the bewildered young man who plays into the hands of both the murderer and the police."

Vincent Canby of The New York Times described 10 Rillington Place as "a solemn, earnest polemic of a movie, one with very little vulgar suspense ... The problem with the film is very much the problem with the actual case, which involved small, unimaginative people."

On the review aggregator website Rotten Tomatoes, 64% of 14 critics' reviews are positive.

=== Accolades ===
John Hurt received a nomination for the BAFTA Award for Best Supporting Actor at the 25th British Academy Film Awards.

=== Legacy ===
In a 2009 review, J. Hoberman of The Village Voice wrote: "More highly regarded these days than when it was released in 1971, Richard Fleischer's 10 Rillington Place is a grimly efficient treatment of a once-notorious case".

The same year, Keith Uhlich of Time Out gave the film a 5-star review and described it as an "underseen gem". In 2023, Jack Hawkins of /Film wrote that 10 Rillington Place had "barely a flaw of note" and listed it among the most underrated films of the 1970s.

In an interview with Robert K. Elder in his book The Best Film You've Never Seen, director Sean Durkin states that 10 Rillington Place "depicts this story the way that a piece of journalism might, as opposed to worrying about preconceived notions of what a film should achieve." Phil Hardy of the British Film Institute observed Attenborough had the ability of "getting into the flesh of the paranoid and the distressed", describing the film as a "detailed account of life under the shadow of World War II [which] is powerful and compelling".

BBC Culture film critic Andrew Male said of the film: "I think 10 Rillington Place is a masterpiece that I have no desire to ever revisit. I think it's so effective in conjuring up an atmosphere of evil and malaise that I find it far scarier than any so-called horror film I've ever seen."

== Sources ==
- Attenborough, Richard (1982). In Search of Gandhi. New Century. pp. 146–147. ISBN 978-0-832-90237-6.
- Elder, Robert K. (2013). The Best Film You've Never Seen: 35 Directors Champion the Forgotten Or Critically Savaged Movies They Love. Chicago, Illinois: Chicago Review Press. ISBN 978-1-61374-929-6.
- Fenton, Harvey; Flint, David (2001). Ten Years of Terror: British Horror Films of the 1970s. London, England: FAB Press. ISBN 978-1-903-25408-0.
- Hardy, Phil (1997). The BFI Companion to Crime. Berkeley, California: University of California Press. ISBN 978-0-520-21538-2.
- Russell, William B. (2009). Teaching Social Issues with Film. Charlotte, North Carolina: IAP. ISBN 978-1-60752-117-4.
- Snelson, Tim (2023). "'The Horror Film to End All Horror Films': 10 Rillington Place and the British Censors' Shifting Policy on True Crime". In Etienne, Anne; Halligan, Benjamin; Weedman, Christopher (eds.). Adult Themes: British Cinema and the X Certificate in the Long 1960s. New York City, New York: Bloomsbury USA. pp. 199–216. ISBN 978-1-501-37528-6.
- Weismann, Brad (2023). Horror Unmasked: A History of Terror from Nosferatu to Nope. New York City, New York: Quarto Publishing Group. ISBN 978-0-760-37679-9.
