= Phyllis MacMahon =

Irish actress (1935–2026)

Phyllis MacMahon (11 August 1935 – 10 September 2026) was an Irish actress. She is known for her work in films such as 10 Rillington Place (1971) in which she played Muriel Eady, the first woman murdered in the film by Richard Attenborough's John Christie, Leo the Last (1970), I Don't Want to Be Born (1975), The Magdalene Sisters (2002) and Shaun of the Dead (2004). She also played an Irish nurse in John Mackenzie's Made (1972). She typically played nuns, prostitutes or old aunts.

McMahon was born on 11 August 1935, and died at a nursing home in Dublin, on 10 September 2026, at the age of 91.

== Filmography ==
Year	Title	Role	Notes
1970	Leo the Last	Blonde Whore	
1971	10 Rillington Place	Muriel Eady	
1972	Made	Irish Nurse	
1975	I Don't Want to Be Born	Nun	
2002	The Magdalene Sisters	Sister Augusta	
2004	Shaun of the Dead	Bernie	
2006	Peppermint	Nan	
2009	Eamon	Grand Aunt	
2017	Phantom Thread	Tippy	
