= St Patrick's Roman Catholic Cemetery =

Cemetery in London, England

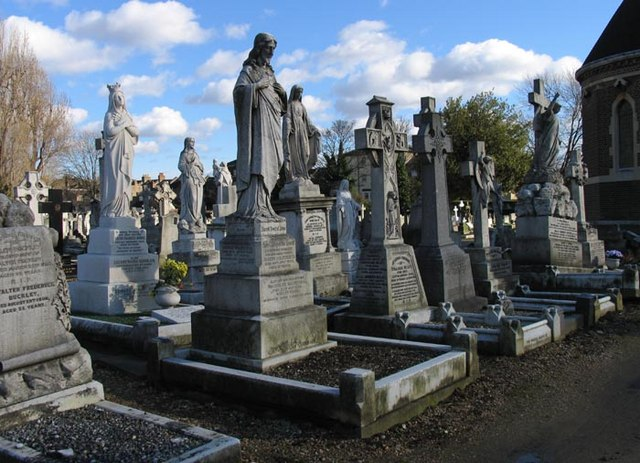
- St Patrick's Roman Catholic cemetery
- Interactive map of St Patrick's Roman Catholic Cemetery

Details
- Established: 1861
- Location: Langthorne Road, Waltham Forest, London, E11 4HL
- Country: England
- Coordinates: 51.5570°N 0.0011°W
- Type: Roman Catholic
- Owned by: Secular Clergy Common Fund
- Size: 43 acres (17 ha)
- No. of graves: 170,000+

St Patrick's Roman Catholic Cemetery is a cemetery located in Waltham Forest, London. The cemetery is crossed by tarmac roadways and paths, with trees planted throughout including mature oak, poplar, Lombardy poplar, plane and sycamore. There are a number of fine monuments, including the striking modernist Ferrari mausoleum. It dates from 1965, and commemorates Lucia Ferrari, "Mamma adorabile".

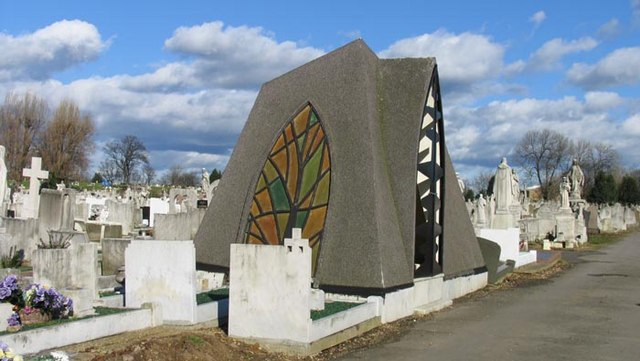
Ferrari mausoleum

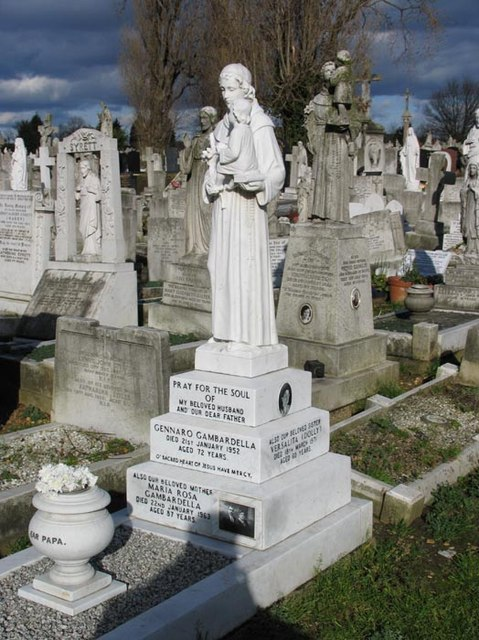

== History ==
It was opened in 1868 in response to the growing demand arising from population growth for consecrated burial space by the Catholic community in East London. It is one of only two Roman Catholic cemeteries in London (the other being a sister cemetery in West London, St Mary's Catholic Cemetery, Kensal Green).

The population of London grew and grew during the 19th century, as did the city's physical footprint. Places that were once small villages surrounded by fields were swallowed up by the growing metropolis, with rows of terraced homes replacing the open spaces. Some of these Victorian homes can be seen in the streets around St Patrick's cemetery – both Leyton and Leytonstone were among those places, that grew up as suburbs after the arrival of the railways made it easier for people to commute into central London for work. Nearby Hackney saw its population rise from 38,000 in 1861 to a staggering 125,000 only ten years later. It catered for the sizeable Irish and Italian communities who lived in London in the 19th century and their descendants, as well as Catholics from other parts of Britain who moved to London to seek work.

There is a section for graves of Lithuanians.

The cemetery buildings, including its yellow brick Gothic mortuary chapel, were designed by the Roman Catholic architect Samuel J Nicholl. By the early 1980s 168,000 burials are recorded as having taken place at St Patrick's.

== Notable burials ==
- Donald Calthrop (1888–1940), actor
- Walter James Croot (1875–1897), bantamweight championship boxer
- Timothy Evans (1924–1950), wrongly convicted of the murder of his wife and daughter (reburial 1965, previously buried at HMP Pentonville).
- Stephen Lewis (1926–2015), actor
- Mary Jane Kelly (1863–1888), final victim of Jack the Ripper
- Patrick Mullane VC (1858–1919), Second Anglo-Afghan War Victoria Cross recipient
- Four Franciscan nuns drowned in the 1875 wreck of the SS Deutschland

== War graves ==
The war memorial consists of a raised platform with rows of white headstones hedged to the rear, with a white stone monument in the front. There are 147 Commonwealth burials of the 1914–1918 war here, those whose graves are not marked by headstones are commemorated on Special Memorial headstones erected in a row within the main War Plot. There are 134 Commonwealth burials of the 1939–1945 war here, those whose graves are not marked by headstones are commemorated on a Screen Wall Memorial in the main War Plot. There are also 2 Foreign National war burials and 3 non war service burials.
