= Justine Hardy =

British journalist and author (born 1966)

- Born: 1 April 1966 (age 60)
- Parent(s): Robert Hardy and Sally Pearson

Justine Hardy (born April 1966) is a British journalist, author, and integrated trauma therapist who has spent most of her adult life in India. She has been a journalist in South Asia, including Kashmir, where she established Healing Kashmir to help people overcome the trauma of the Insurgency in Jammu and Kashmir that began in 1989.

== Early life and education ==
She was born in London, raised in Oxfordshire, and educated in England. Hardy is the daughter of Robert Hardy, a noted actor, and actress Sally Pearson, whose parents were actress Dame Gladys Cooper and Sir Neville Pearson. In 1978, she won the Partridge Essay Contest at her school in Banbury, Oxfordshire. She attended Tudor Hall School, Banbury.

Hardy has been a residential INSPIRE fellow at Tufts University’s Institute of Global Leadership. In 2011, she received an internship to the Oslo Scholars Program.

== Career ==
=== Journalist and presenter ===
Hardy has reported on South Asia for over 25 years since about 1990. She has written much about her experiences in Kashmir, which has been the site of conflict since the 1947 partition between India and Pakistan, which resulted in the first First Kashmir War. Since 1989, there has been conflict in the region, with fighters backed by China, Iran, and the United States.

She has written for an Indian newspaper and contributed to Financial Times, The Times, Vanity Fair, Traveler, and National Review. She became a regular contributor to Traveller magazine in 2015. She has written about female activists within Islam, peace, and the mental health crisis in Kashmir. Other subjects include social topics, book reviews, and travel.

In 1996, she began working as a documentary presenter for Channel 4 on the series Urban Jungle. She was a presenter on Travel TV for four years. She has also been involved in several BBC programs about India, and was also a co-presenter on a BBC series about Eastern philosophy in the West.

She is on the advisory board of Women's Voices Now, which advocates women's rights through film.

=== Author ===
Hardy wrote The Ochre Border: A Journey through the Tibetan Frontierlands in 1995, which is an account of Hardy's journey to a remote valley on the Indo-Tibetan border in the Himalayas. Four years later, Scoop-Wallah (1999) recounts Hardy's stint as a reporter for a Delhi newspaper. (Note: Scoop-Wallah was short-listed for the Thomas Cook Travel Book Award in 2000.) Goat: A Story of Kashmir and Notting Hill (2000) contemplates the route taken by the goat hair gathered in Tibet to fashionable London, where it is sold in the form of shawls. She wrote Bollywood Boy in 2002, which is a study of the Indian film business, Bollywood. Geographical says, "In this, her best book yet, she captures the glitz of Bollywood while laying bare the more sinister side of a business enmeshed with the underworld, using as her central ploy the year-long tracking down of Hrithik Roshan, Bollywood's brightest new star, for an interview."

The Wonder House (2005), Hardy's first novel, is a family chronicle set against the background of the Kashmir conflict. It takes place in October 1999 and the protagonist is a secular, older woman, Gracie Singh. While Library Journal praised the plot twist, they felt that the characters were "bland" and the pacing of the story was slow. (Note: The Wonder House was short-listed for the Author’s Club prize for best first novel in 2006. The Guardian described it as “partly an elegy to Nehruvian secularism in India and to Kashmir...always poised, often engrossing, and sometimes perceptive and moving.”)

The Valley of Mist (2009) tells the story of the conflict in Kashmir through the story of the people in Kashmir, where she has lived for several years. (Note: The Valley of Mist was a runner-up for the Dayton Literary Peace Prize in 2010.) She spent time with the Dars in 1997 and much of her experience with the Muslim family over two decades in the city is part of the book. Kenneth McClane, a Cornell professor and judge for the Dayton prize, called the book “magnificent” and compared it to the works of Anton Chekhov and James Baldwin. Booklist wrote that the book's "intimate and dramatic chronicle clarifies and humanizes Kashmir's torments, which are of grave global consequence." Library Journal wrote that "Hardy's account contributes to our understanding of the tragedy of cross-cultural conflicts, if not its solutions."

Hardy's books have been translated into nine languages.

=== Aid projects ===
Following the October 2005 Kashmir earthquake, she worked to rebuild schools, a medical center, and homes with a local non-governmental organization (NGO). Hardy has been involved in several aid projects, including the Kashmir Welfare Trust. She also directs the Development Research and Action Group, which establishes schools in the Delhi slums. She has worked for over two decades with The New Bridge Foundation, which seeks to rehabilitate criminal offenders.

=== Healing Kashmir ===
In 2010, Hardy founded Healing Kashmir, a mental health program to provide a comprehensive treatment plan to help patients overcome "the debilitating mental health situation in the region." Médecins Sans Frontières (MSF), along with the Institute of Mental Health and Neurosciences (IMHANS) and Kashmir University's Department of Psychology conducted a mental health survey of Kashmir, the first comprehensive study of the country. Performed in 399 villages between October and December 2015, it found that a majority of people have experienced or witnessed conflict-related trauma and nearly 1.8 million adults or 45% of adults in Kashmir suffer from mental distress. In the Kashmir Valley, about 7.7 million people, or one in five adults, have significant PTSD symptoms and about 2.48 million meet the diagnostic criteria for PTSD.

The country's health system is overwhelmed by the increasing number of patients. There are not enough government mental health resources and clinicians might have just a couple of minutes to spend with each person. The traditional mental health approach in the country is to medicate patients—with high doses of sedatives, tranquilizers, or antidepressants—that do not address the underlying issues that bring relief over the long term. In many cases, the medicine caused side effects that were worse than the diagnosed disorder. Many people commit suicide. Further, the culture there does not support openly discussing mental health issues.

Hardy brought in therapists and implemented treatment plans that include use of alternative and conventional treatments, including counseling, homeopathic medicine, and several forms of hands-on healing therapies. Healing Kashmir, sees patients in the clinical environment—in its main office in Burzalla, Srinagar or in hospitals in six areas—and in villages. The charity also conducts awareness and training programs in universities and colleges and for child development workers. Hardy said, "the gradual breakdown of the stigma associated with mental illness is one of our biggest accomplishments." It was registered as a nongovernmental organization in the United Kingdom and India in 2009, and it is headquartered in Baghat Burzalla, Srinagar.
