= Michael Eddowes =

British lawyer and author (1903–1993)

Michael Henry Beaumont Eddowes (8 October 1903 – 28 December 1993) was a British lawyer, author, and investigator, best known for his involvement in the Profumo affair and for his conspiracy theory involving Lee Harvey Oswald.

== Early life ==
Eddowes was born in Derby, Derbyshire, to solicitor Charles Randolph Beaumont Eddowes and Florence Greenfield Eddowes. He came from a family of barristers and built a large law practice specializing in divorce.

== Timothy Evans ==
Eddowes' first case to gain attention involved Timothy Evans, who was hanged in 1950 for the murder of his daughter. Eddowes wrote a book on this case called The Man On Your Conscience in which he argued that the real culprit was John Christie, an English serial killer. It was because of Eddowes' efforts and those of others, such as Ludovic Kennedy and Sydney Silverman, that the case was reinvestigated and Evans was issued a posthumous pardon. The outcry over this case helped to lead to the abolition of the death penalty in the United Kingdom. Many years later, his son John published a book which argued against his father's claims that Evans had been innocent.

== Profumo affair ==
Eddowes was connected with the John Profumo scandal of 1963. Eddowes was a confidante of Stephen Ward, a society osteopath, who introduced him to Christine Keeler in October 1962. According to Keeler, he was interested in her but too old for her tastes. In January 1963, Keeler approached Eddowes for legal advice following a domestic incident with her ex-boyfriend, who had fired shots at Ward's home. Eddowes grew suspicious upon discovering she was also involved with Soviet naval attaché Yevgeny Ivanov and reported what he learned to Scotland Yard. In The Trial of Christine Keeler, a 2019–20 BBC One miniseries, he is portrayed by Anton Lesser

== The Oswald File ==
In 1975, Eddowes authored The Oswald File, in which he claimed that a Soviet imposter took the place of Lee Harvey Oswald when Oswald was in the Soviet Union, came to the United States where he assassinated United States president John F. Kennedy, and was subsequently buried in Oswald's grave. Eddowes asserted there were differences between Oswald and the autopsy performed by Earl Rose. He mentioned that Oswald was 5 ft 11 in (180 cm) in height according to his U.S. Marine Corps records, and that the Dallas pathologists said the assassin they autopsied was 5 ft 9 in (175 cm). In his book, Eddowes cites several times after Oswald's return from the Soviet Union when he gave his height as 5 ft 11 in if asked but when he was actually measured he was a few inches shorter. The corpse also had a large scar on the wrist; Eddowes stated that Oswald had no such scar. Eddowes argued that, as a child, Oswald had a mastoid operation that left him with a depression in the flesh behind one of his ears, as well as a dime sized hole in his skull, and that the corpse of the man Jack Ruby killed had no such depression or hole in the skull. Eddowes sought action in Texas courts and the body was exhumed in 1981. The body, in an advanced state of decomposition, proved to be Oswald. The exhumation was reported to have cost Eddowes between $8,000 and $15,000.

== Death ==
Eddowes died, aged 90, of a burst aneurysm on 28 December 1993 at his home in Felpham, West Sussex.
