= Patrick Mullane =

Recipient of the Victoria Cross

Patrick Mullane VC
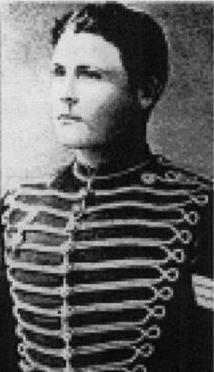
- Born: October 1858; Ahmednuggar (now Ahmednagar), Deccan, India
- Died: 20 November 1919 (aged 61); Plaistow, London, England
- Burial place: St Patrick's Roman Catholic Cemetery, Leytonstone
- Military career
- Allegiance: United Kingdom
- Branch: British Army
- Rank: Regimental Sergeant-Major
- Units: Royal Horse Artillery
- Conflicts: Second Anglo-Afghan War
- Awards: Victoria Cross

Patrick Mullane VC (October 1858 – 20 November 1919) was a recipient of the Victoria Cross, the highest and most prestigious award for gallantry in the face of the enemy that can be awarded to British and Commonwealth forces. He later achieved the rank of regimental sergeant-major.

== Early life ==
Mullane was born in Ahmednagar, Deccan, India, the son of Marguerite and Private Patrick Mullane, Royal Artillery.

== Award details ==
He was about 21 years old, and a sergeant in the Royal Horse Artillery, British Army during the Second Anglo-Afghan War when the following deed took place during the battle of Maiwand for which he was awarded the VC:

For conspicuous bravery during the action at Maiwand, on the 27th July, 1880, in endeavouring to save the life of Driver Pickwell Istead. This Non-Commissioned Officer, when the battery to which he belonged, was on the point of retiring, and the enemy were within ten or fifteen yards, unhesitatingly ran back about two yards and picking up Driver Istead, placed him on the limber, where, unfortunately, he died almost immediately. Again, during the retreat, Sergeant Mullane volunteered to procure water for the wounded, and succeeded in doing so by going into one of the villages in which so many men lost their lives.

== Sothebys near sale of the medal 1904 ==
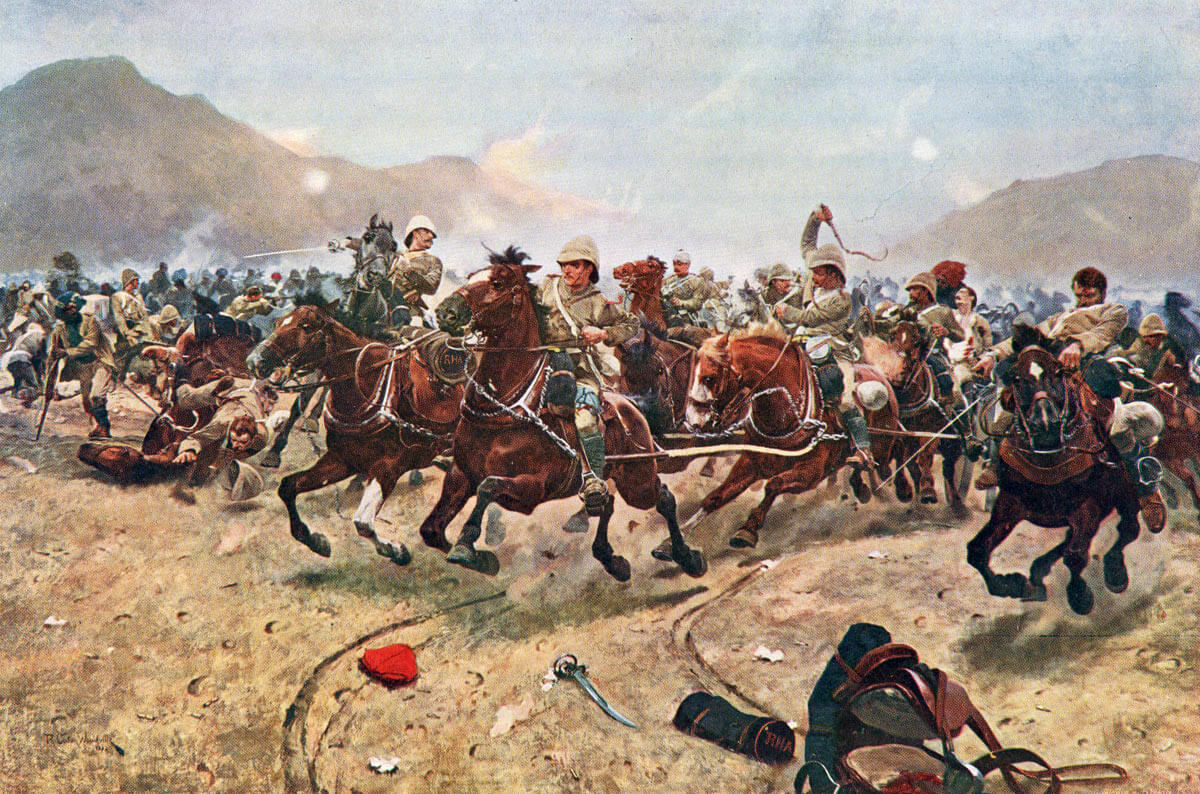
The artillery flee at the Battle of Maiwand

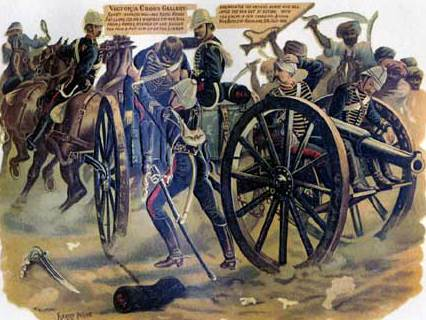
Patrick Mullane VC action

The Sotheby's auction house in London were about to auction the medal that had previously been sold by Patrick Mullane's relatives.

But on the morning of the sale in 1904 a giant of a man came to Sothebys in great tribulation. It [Mullane] was abroad and out of touch with the people. At once Tom Hodge, Sotheby's famous auctioneer, who died last year [1938] informed Capt. Buckingham [the then owner] who immediately restored the precious Cross to the tearful sergent. As Tom Hodge remarked to me: "This was the most chivalrous act in my experience."
