= Mount Pleasant, Merthyr Tydfil =

Village in Merthyr Tydfil, Wales

Coordinates: 51°40′45″N 3°20′05″W

Mount Pleasant is a small village in the south of Merthyr Tydfil County Borough, Wales. It lies about 1 km (2/3 mi) south of Merthyr Vale, along the A4054 road (the former route of the A470 to Cardiff) and between that road and the River Taff.

The village is also known as "The Black Lion" after the old signal box, controlling passenger and coal lines from Merthyr Vale Colliery to Cardiff on the Taff Vale Railway.

== History ==
The village of Mount Pleasant emerged in the late 19th century during the expansion of coal mining in the area. The Merthyr Vale Colliery, established between 1869 and 1875 by industrialist John Nixon, played a pivotal role in the development of nearby communities, including Mount Pleasant, Aberfan, and Merthyr Vale. These communities were constructed to house the growing workforce required for the colliery's operations. In 1876, the establishment of places of worship, such as Bethania Welsh Independent and Aberfan Calvinistic Methodist chapels, marked the growth of these settlements.

Mount Pleasant is colloquially known as "The Black Lion," a name derived from the old signal box that once controlled the passenger and coal lines from Merthyr Vale Colliery to Cardiff on the Taff Vale Railway. This railway was instrumental in transporting coal from the colliery to broader markets, facilitating the economic growth of the region.

On 7 July 1941, Mount Pleasant was the site of a tragic accident involving two Spitfire fighters from the Royal Canadian Air Force. During a training exercise, the aircraft collided mid-air, resulting in one crashing into a field and the other into a house at the end of South View in Mount Pleasant. The incident claimed the lives of five individuals, including both pilots and three civilians. A monument was later erected to honor the victims of this disaster.

Mount Pleasant School, established in 1912, served the educational needs of the village's children for nearly a century before its closure in 2010.
