= Robert Hardy =

British actor (1925–2017)

Robert Hardy CBE FSA
- Hardy as Cornelius Fudge in Harry Potter and the Order of the Phoenix (2007)
- Born: Timothy Sydney Robert Hardy; 29 October 1925; Cheltenham, Gloucestershire, England
- Died: 3 August 2017 (aged 91); Northwood, London, England
- Education: Magdalen College, Oxford
- Occupation: Actor
- Years active: 1949–2017
- Spouses: Elizabeth Fox (1952–1956) Sally Pearson (1961–1986)
- Robert Hardy's voice from the BBC programme Desert Island Discs, 20 November 2011.

Timothy Sydney Robert Hardy (29 October 1925 – 3 August 2017) was an English actor who had a long career in theatre, film and television. He began his career as a classical actor and later earned widespread recognition for roles such as Siegfried Farnon in the BBC television series All Creatures Great and Small, Cornelius Fudge in the Harry Potter film series, and Winston Churchill in several productions, beginning with the Southern Television series Winston Churchill: The Wilderness Years. He was nominated for the BAFTA for Best Actor for All Creatures Great and Small in 1980 and Winston Churchill: The Wilderness Years in 1982. Aside from acting, Hardy was an acknowledged expert on the medieval English longbow and wrote two books on the subject.

== Early life ==
Hardy was born in Cheltenham on 29 October 1925 to Henry Harrison Hardy, MBE, of Old Farm, Bishop's Cleeve, Tewkesbury, Gloucestershire, and Edith Jocelyn, daughter of Rev. Sydney Dugdale, rector of Whitchurch, Shropshire, a member of a landed gentry family of Wroxall Abbey, Wroxall, Warwickshire. Henry Hardy was the headmaster of Cheltenham College and later of Shrewsbury School, and a Major in the Rifle Brigade.

Hardy was educated at Rugby School and Magdalen College, Oxford, where his studies were interrupted by service in the Royal Air Force during World War II. He trained as a pilot, receiving part of his instruction in the British Flying Training School Program in Terrell, Texas. Although he visited Los Angeles when on leave from flight training at Terrell, his later acting career never gained a foothold in Hollywood. After service in the RAF, he returned to gain a BA (Hons) in English. On BBC Radio 4's Desert Island Discs, he described the degree he obtained as "shabby", although he treasured the time spent studying under C. S. Lewis and J. R. R. Tolkien.

== Career ==
Hardy began his career as a classical actor, and made an early Hollywood film appearance in a minor role opposite Glenn Ford in the 1958 war film Torpedo Run. In 1959, he appeared as The King of France in All's Well That Ends Well in April 1959, directed by Tyrone Guthrie at Stratford-upon-Avon, with Vanessa Redgrave and Diana Rigg indicated as supporting extras. He subsequently appeared as Sicinius opposite Laurence Olivier in Coriolanus at Stratford-upon-Avon, directed by Peter Hall. In this production, Ian Holm featured as a "Third Aufidious Servant", Vanessa Redgrave as Valeria, and Diana Rigg as a "Roman Citizen". Albert Finney featured as a "First Roman Citizen". Hardy then appeared in Shakespeare's Henry V on stage and in television's An Age of Kings (1960), and subsequently played Coriolanus in The Spread of the Eagle (BBC, 1963) and Sir Toby Belch for the BBC Television Shakespeare production of Twelfth Night in 1980. Over the years, Hardy played a range of parts on television and film. His first continuing role in a TV series was as businessman Alec Stewart in the award-winning oil company drama The Troubleshooters for the BBC, which he played from 1966 to 1970. He won further acclaim for his portrayal of the mentally-unhinged Abwehr Sgt. Gratz in LWT's 1969 war drama Manhunt. In 1975, Hardy portrayed Albert, Prince Consort in the award-winning 13-hour serial Edward the Seventh (known as Edward the King to the American audience), which he regarded as one of his best performances. "I thought I'd done a good job there, although I believe the Royal Family didn't like it all. There are always people who don't like what one does."

Hardy was seen as the irascible senior veterinary surgeon Siegfried Farnon in the long-running All Creatures Great and Small (1978–90), an adaptation of James Herriot's semi-autobiographical books. Hardy also made an appearance in the 1986–88 ITV comedy series Hot Metal, in which he played the dual roles of newspaper proprietor Twiggy Rathbone (who bore more than a passing resemblance to Rupert Murdoch) and his editor, Russell Spam. In 1993 Hardy appeared in an episode of Inspector Morse, playing Andrew Baydon in "Twilight of the Gods". In 1994, he played Arthur Brooke in the BBC production of Middlemarch. In 2002, he played the role of pompous and eccentric Professor Neddy Welch in a WTTV/WGBH Boston co-production of Lucky Jim, adapted from the novel by Kingsley Amis. It aired originally as part of the Masterpiece series on PBS in the U.S. and starred Stephen Tompkinson in the title role of Jim Dixon, a luckless lecturer at a provincial British university.

Hardy played both Winston Churchill and Franklin D. Roosevelt, each on more than one occasion. He played Churchill most notably in Winston Churchill: The Wilderness Years (1981), for which he was nominated for a BAFTA award, but also in The Sittaford Mystery, Bomber Harris and War and Remembrance. On 20 August 2010, he read Churchill's famous wartime address "Never was so much owed by so many to so few" at a ceremony to mark the 70th anniversary of the speech. He played Roosevelt in the BBC serial, Bertie and Elizabeth, and in the French TV mini-series, Le Grand Charles, about the life of Charles de Gaulle. He also played Robert Dudley, Earl of Leicester, in Elizabeth R and took the role of Sir John Middleton in the 1995 film version of Sense and Sensibility.

Hardy's big screen roles included Professor Krempe in Mary Shelley's Frankenstein and Minister for Magic Cornelius Fudge in the Harry Potter films.

Hardy's voice performance as Robin Hood in Tale Spinners For Children, an LP from the 1960s, is considered one of the best Robin Hood renditions. His voice was also the voice of D'Artagnan in The Three Musketeers and of Frédéric Chopin, in The Story of Chopin.

== Awards ==
Hardy was appointed a Commander of the Order of the British Empire (CBE) in the 1981 Birthday Honours.

== Personal life ==
Hardy's first marriage, in 1952, was to Elizabeth Fox, the daughter of Sir Lionel Fox; they had a son. This marriage ended in 1956. In 1961 he married Sally Pearson, the daughter of the baronet Sir Neville Pearson and Dame Gladys Cooper as well as a half-sister of John Buckmaster and a sister-in-law of Robert Morley. From this marriage, which ended in 1986, Hardy had two other children, one of whom is Justine Hardy, a journalist, activist and psychotherapist who founded Healing Kashmir.

Hardy was a close friend of actor Richard Burton, whom he met at Oxford University. He shared some memories of their wartime friendship and read extracts from Burton's newly published diaries at the Cheltenham Literature Festival in 2012.

While playing Henry V, Hardy developed an interest in medieval warfare, and in 1963 he wrote and presented an acclaimed television documentary on the subject of the Battle of Agincourt. He also wrote two books on the subject of the longbow, Longbow: A Social and Military History and The Great Warbow: From Hastings to the Mary Rose with Matthew Strickland. He was one of the experts consulted by the archaeologist responsible for raising the Mary Rose. He was Master of the Worshipful Company of Bowyers of the City of London from 1988 to 1990. In 1996 he was elected a Fellow of the Society of Antiquaries.

In February 2013, Hardy withdrew from his scheduled performance as Winston Churchill in Peter Morgan's play, The Audience, after suffering cracked ribs as the result of a fall.

Hardy died on 3 August 2017, aged 91, at Denville Hall, a home for retired actors.

== TV and filmography ==
=== Films ===
Year	Title	Role	Notes
1958	Torpedo Run	Lieutenant Redley	
1962	A Question of Fact	Colin Gardiner	with Ursula Jeans
1965	The Spy Who Came In from the Cold	Dick Carlton	
1967	How I Won the War	British General	
1967	Berserk!	Detective Supt. Brooks	
1971	10 Rillington Place	Malcolm Morris	
1972	Young Winston	Prep School Headmaster	
1972	Demons of the Mind	Zorn	
1973	Psychomania	Chief Inspector Hesseltine	
1973	Escape to Nowhere	Chief of M.I.5's assistant	
1973	Gawain and the Green Knight	Sir Bertilak	
1973	Yellow Dog	Alexander	
1973	Dark Places	Edward Foster/Andrew Marr	
1974	The Slap	Robert	
1975	The Secret Agent	Assistant Commissioner	
1984	The Shooting Party	Lord Bob Lilburn	
1987	Northanger Abbey	General Tilney	
1988	Paris by Night	Adam Gillvray	
1994	Mary Shelley's Frankenstein	Professor Krempe	
1995	A Feast at Midnight	Headmaster	
1995	Sense and Sensibility	Sir John Middleton	
1997	Mrs. Dalloway	Sir William Bradshaw	
1998	The Tichborne Claimant	Lord Rivers	
1998	The Barber of Siberia	Forsten	
1998	An Ideal Husband	Lord Caversham	
2002	Thunderpants	Doctor	
2002	Harry Potter and the Chamber of Secrets	Cornelius Fudge	
2002	The Gathering	The Bishop	
2004	Harry Potter and the Prisoner of Azkaban	Cornelius Fudge	
2004	Making Waves	Father Parry	
2005	Harry Potter and the Goblet of Fire	Cornelius Fudge	
2005	Lassie	Judge Murray	
2007	Harry Potter and the Order of the Phoenix	Cornelius Fudge	
2008	Framed	Provost	
2009	Old Harry	Old Harry	
2015	Joseph's Reel	Old Joseph	Short film
2017	Snapshot Wedding	Donald	
2017	In Familia	Ashton Leonard	

=== Television ===
- David Copperfield (1956) ... David Copperfield
- The Buccaneers (1957 TV serial)
- The Adventures of Sir Lancelot (TV series) (1957)
- The Veil, Boris Karloff TV series (1958) Vision of Crime, .....George Bosworth
- An Age of Kings (1960)
- The Spread of the Eagle (1963) .... Coriolanus
- The Troubleshooters (1966–1970)
- The Baron (1966), episode "A Memory of Evil"
- The Saint (1968), series 6, episode 4, "The Desperate Diplomat" .... Walter Faber
- Manhunt (1969) .... Abwehr Sgt. Graz
- Elizabeth R (1971) .... Robert Dudley
- The Stalls of Barchester (1971)... Dr. Haynes
- The Incredible Robert Baldick (1972) .... Sir Robert Baldick
- The Gathering Storm (1974) .... Joachim von Ribbentrop
- Edward the Seventh (1975) .... Albert, Prince Consort
- Upstairs, Downstairs (1975), series 5, episode 8, "Such A Lovely Man"
- The Duchess of Duke Street (1976) Episode: "A Lady of Virtue" ... George Duggan
- All Creatures Great and Small (1978–1980 and 1988–1990; entire series) .... Siegfried Farnon
- Play for Today (1979) Sir Malcolm Campbell
- Twelfth Night (1980)
- The Pied Piper of Hamelin (1981), narrator of BAFTA winning animation by Cosgrove Hall Films
- Winston Churchill: The Wilderness Years (1981), Winston Churchill
- The Zany Adventures of Robin Hood (1984) .... King Richard
- Jenny's War (1985) .... Klein
- Hot Metal (1986–1988) .... Terence "Twiggy" Rathbone
- Northanger Abbey (1987) .... General Tilney
- War and Remembrance (1988) .... Winston Churchill
- Bomber Harris (1989) .... Winston Churchill
- The Case-Book of Sherlock Holmes, episode "The Master Blackmailer" (1992) .... Charles Augustus Milverton
- Middlemarch (1994) .... Mr. Brooke
- Gulliver's Travels (1996) ....TV Mini-Series, Dr. Parnell
- Castle Ghosts of England, Scotland, Wales, and Ireland (1997) .... Host
- Inspector Morse (1993), series 7, episode 3, "Twilight of the Gods"
- Midsomer Murders (1999), series 2, episode 3, "Dead Man's Eleven" - Robert Cavendish
- The 10th Kingdom (2000) .... Chancellor Griswold
- The Lost World (2001) .... Professor Illingworth
- Foyle's War, "The German Woman" (2002) Series 1, Episode 1
- The Falklands Play (2002) .... Anthony Parsons (HM Ambassador to the UN)
- Lucky Jim (2003) .... Professor Neddy Welch
- Spooks (2003), second series, episode 4, "Blood and Money" .... Governor of the Bank of England
- Making Waves (2004)
- Agatha Christie's Marple, series 2, episode 4, "The Sittaford Mystery" (2006) .... Winston Churchill
- Little Dorrit (2008) .... Tite Barnacle
- Margaret (2009) .... Willie Whitelaw
- Lewis, series 4, episode 2, "Dark Matter" (2010)
- Churchill: 100 Days That Saved Britain (2015) .... Winston Churchill
