= Timothy Evans =

Welsh wrongfully executed man (1924–1950)

- Evans being escorted by police from Paddington Station to Notting Hill Police Station, December 1949
- Born: 20 November 1924; Merthyr Tydfil, Glamorgan, Wales
- Died: 9 March 1950 (aged 25); HMP Pentonville, London, England
- Resting place: St Patrick's Roman Catholic Cemetery, London, England
- Occupation: Lorry driver
- Known for: Wrongfully executed for the murder of his daughter
- Status: Executed (9 March 1950; 76 years ago); Pardoned (October 1966; 60 years ago); Partially exonerated (19 November 2004; 22 years ago)
- Conviction: Murder (pardoned)
- Penalty: Death

Timothy John Evans (20 November 1924 – 9 March 1950) was a Welsh lorry driver who was wrongfully executed for the murder of his wife Beryl and infant daughter Geraldine at their residence in Notting Hill, London. In January 1950, Evans was tried and convicted of the murder of his daughter, and on 9 March he was executed by hanging. During his trial, Evans accused his downstairs neighbour, John Christie, who was the chief prosecution witness in the case against him, of committing the murders.

Three years after Evans's execution, Christie was found to be a serial killer who had murdered several other women in the same house, including his own wife Ethel. Christie was himself sentenced to death, and while awaiting execution, he confessed to having murdered Mrs. Evans. An official inquiry concluded in 1966 that Christie had murdered Evans's daughter Geraldine, and Evans was granted a posthumous pardon. The High Court dismissed proceedings to officially quash Evans's murder conviction in 2004 on the grounds of the cost and resources that would be involved, but acknowledged that Evans did not murder his wife or his daughter, 54 years after his wrongful execution.

The revelation that the state had executed an innocent man generated much controversy, and is regarded as one of the most infamous miscarriages of justice in the United Kingdom. Along with those of Derek Bentley and Ruth Ellis, the case played a major role in the restriction of capital punishment in 1957, the introduction of diminished responsibility into English law and, eventually, the abolition of hanging for murder in 1965.

== Early life ==
Evans was a native of Merthyr Tydfil in Glamorgan, Wales. His father, Daniel, abandoned the family in April 1924 before Evans's birth. Evans had an older sister, Eileen, born in 1921 and a younger half-sister, Maureen, who was born in September 1929. Evans's mother remarried in September 1933. As a child, Evans had difficulty learning to speak and struggled at school. Following an accident when he was eight, Evans developed a tubercular verruca on his right foot that never completely healed and caused him to miss considerable amounts of time from school for treatments, further setting back his education. As a result, when he reached adulthood Evans possessed low literacy skills, often needing others to read lengthy documents to him, although he did possess some ability to read simple passages such as in comics, newspaper football reports and on his wages and receipts. He liked boxing and football, supporting Queens Park Rangers, as did Christie. He was also prone to inventing stories about himself to boost his self-esteem, a trait that continued into adulthood and interfered with his efforts to establish credibility when dealing with the police and courts.

In 1935, his mother and her second husband moved to London, and Evans worked as a painter and decorator while attending school. He returned to Merthyr Tydfil in 1937 and briefly worked in the coal mines but had to resign because of continuing problems with his foot. In 1939, he returned to London to live again with his mother, and in 1946 they moved to St Mark's Road, Notting Hill. This was just over two minutes' walk from 10 Rillington Place, his future residence after he married. Evans was fined 60 shillings at West London Magistrates' Court on 25 April 1946 for stealing a car, and driving without insurance or a licence.

== Married life ==
On 20 September 1947, Evans married Beryl Susanna Thorley, whom he had met in January 1947 on a blind date. The couple initially lived with Evans's family at St Mark's Road but after Beryl discovered she was pregnant in 1948 they moved into the top-floor flat at 10 Rillington Place in the Ladbroke Grove area of Notting Hill. Their neighbours in the ground-floor flat were the serial killer John Christie, then working as a post office clerk, and his wife, Ethel Christie. Timothy's and Beryl's daughter Geraldine was born on 10 October 1948.

The marriage was characterised by angry quarrels. Beryl was alleged to be a poor housekeeper and incapable of managing the family's finances, while Timothy misspent his wages on alcohol, and his heavy drinking at the time exacerbated his already short temper. The arguments between Timothy and Beryl were loud enough to be heard by the neighbours. The arguments were about Timothy lying to his wife, associating with other women, and the family's financial troubles. Multiple witnesses later testified that Timothy had a violent temper and beat his wife on multiple occasions. Lucy Endicott, a friend of Beryl, described how she once witnessed Timothy "‘set about her and began hitting her with his hand across the face and body." Timothy was also accused of having at least two affairs with other women.

In 1949, Beryl revealed to Timothy that she was pregnant with their second child. Since the family was already struggling financially, Beryl decided to have an abortion. After some initial reluctance, Evans agreed to this course of action.

== Events leading to Evans's arrest ==
Several weeks later, on 30 November 1949, Evans informed police at Merthyr Tydfil that his wife had died in unusual circumstances. His first confession was that he had accidentally killed her by giving her something in a bottle that a man had given him to abort the foetus; he had then disposed of her body in a sewer drain outside 10 Rillington Place. He told the police that after arranging for Geraldine to be looked after, he had gone to Wales. When police examined the drain outside the front of the building, however, they found nothing and, furthermore, discovered that the manhole cover required the combined strength of three officers to remove it.

When re-questioned, Evans changed his story and said that Christie had offered to perform an abortion on Beryl. Evans stated that he had left Christie out of his first statement in order to protect him (abortion being illegal in the UK at this time). After some deliberation between Evans and his wife, they had both agreed to take up Christie's offer. On 8 November, Evans had returned home from work to be informed by Christie that the abortion had not worked and that Beryl was dead. Christie had said that he would dispose of the body and would make arrangements for a couple from East Acton to look after Geraldine. He said that Evans should leave London for the meantime. On 14 November, Evans left for Wales to stay with relatives. Evans said he later returned to 10 Rillington Place to ask about Geraldine, but Christie had refused to let him see her.

In response to Evans's second statement, the police performed a preliminary search of 10 Rillington Place but did not uncover anything incriminating, despite the presence of a human thigh bone supporting a fence post in the tiny (about 16 by 14 feet (4.9 by 4.3 m)) garden. On a more thorough search on 2 December, the police found the body of Beryl Evans, wrapped in a tablecloth in the wash-house in the back garden. Access to the locked wash-house was only possible by using a knife kept by Mrs. Christie. Significantly, the body of Geraldine was also found alongside Beryl's body – Evans had not mentioned he had killed his daughter in either of his statements. Beryl and Geraldine had both been strangled.

Although they examined the garden, the police did not find traces of the skeletal remains of two prior victims of Christie, despite their shallow burial. Christie actually removed the skull of Miss Eady when his dog dug it up from the garden around this time, and he disposed of it in a bombed-out building nearby. This vital clue was ignored when the skull was then discovered by children playing in the ruins and handed in to police.

When Evans was shown the clothing taken from the bodies of his wife and child, he was also informed that both had been strangled. This was, according to Evans's statement, the first occasion in which he was informed that his baby daughter had been killed. He was asked whether he was responsible for their deaths. To this, Evans apparently responded, "Yes." He then apparently confessed to having strangled Beryl during an argument over debts and strangling Geraldine two days later, after which he left for Wales.

This confession, along with other contradictory statements Evans made during the police interrogation, has been cited as proof of his guilt. Several authors who have written about the case have argued that the police provided Evans with all the necessary details for him to make a plausible confession, which they may have in turn edited further while transcribing it. Furthermore, the police interrogated Evans over the course of late evening and early morning hours to his physical and emotional detriment, a man already in a highly emotional state. Evans later stated in court that he thought he would be subjected to violence by the police if he did not confess, and this fear along with the shock of discovering that both his wife and daughter had been strangled, likely induced him to make a false confession. The police investigation was marred by a lack of forensic expertise, with significant evidence overlooked.

The Psychology of Interrogations and Confessions (2003) states that some of the phraseology of the confession seemed more in line with language a police officer might use, rather than that used by an illiterate man, as Evans was. Evans was kept in solitary confinement for two days before being handed over to the London police. He did not know what was happening other than his wife's body had not been found in the drain as expected. At Notting Hill police station, he was shown his wife's and daughter's clothing, and the ligature which had been used to strangle his daughter. This book cites Ludovic Kennedy as a source for the conclusion that Evans felt tremendous guilt over not doing more to prevent the deaths of his wife and daughter, and particularly that his daughter's murder must have been a tremendous shock.

== Trial and execution ==
Evans was put on trial for the murder of his daughter on 11 January 1950 before Mr Justice Lewis and a jury. In accordance with legal practice at the time, the prosecution proceeded only with the single charge of murder, that concerning Geraldine. Beryl's murder, with which Evans was still formally charged, was not formally before the court, though evidence that he had murdered Beryl was used with the aim of establishing Evans's guilt of the murder of Geraldine. Evans, who was represented by Malcolm Morris, withdrew his confession during consultations with his solicitor and alleged that Christie was responsible for the murders in accordance with his second statement given to the police at Merthyr Tydfil. Although this allegation was dismissed by the court as "fantastic" and Evans's solicitors had also warned him that it was difficult to prove, Evans maintained this defence until his execution. It was subsequently found that his allegation was true.

Christie and his wife, Ethel, were key witnesses for the prosecution. Christie denied that he had offered to abort Beryl's unborn child and gave detailed evidence about the quarrels between Evans and his wife. The defence sought to show that Christie was the murderer, highlighting his past criminal record. Christie had previous convictions for several thefts and for malicious wounding. The latter case involved Christie striking a woman on the head with a cricket bat. But his apparent reform, and his service with the police as a special constable, may have impressed the jury. The defence also could not find a motive for which a respected person like Christie would murder two people, whereas the prosecution could use the explanation in Evans's confessions as Evans's motive. Unlike Christie, Evans had no previous convictions for violence, though he had been fined for theft and motoring offences. His conflicting statements undermined his credibility. Had the police conducted a thorough search of the garden and found the bones of two previous victims of Christie, the trial of Evans might not have occurred at all.

The case largely came down to Christie's word against Evans's and the course of the trial turned against Evans. The trial lasted only three days and much key evidence was omitted, or never shown to the jury. Evans was found guilty – the jury taking just 40 minutes to come to its decision. After a failed appeal held before the Lord Chief Justice, Lord Goddard; Mr Justice Sellers and Mr Justice Humphreys on 20 February, Evans was hanged on 9 March 1950 by Albert Pierrepoint, assisted by Syd Dernley at Pentonville Prison.

The safety of Evans's conviction was severely criticised when Christie's murders were discovered three years later. During interviews with police and psychiatrists prior to his execution, Christie admitted several times that he had been responsible for the murder of Beryl Evans. If these confessions were true, Evans's second statement detailing Christie's offer to abort Beryl's baby is likely to be the true version of events that took place at Rillington Place on 8 November 1949. Ludovic Kennedy provided one possible reconstruction of how the murder took place, surmising that an unsuspecting Beryl let Christie into her flat, expecting the abortion to be carried out, but was instead attacked and then strangled. Christie claimed to have possibly engaged in sexual intercourse with Beryl's body after her death (he claimed to be unable to remember the precise details) but her post-mortem had failed to uncover evidence of sexual intercourse. In his confessions to Beryl's death, Christie denied he had agreed to carry out an abortion on Beryl. He instead claimed to have strangled her while being intimate with her, or that she had wanted to commit suicide and he helped her do so.

One important fact was not brought up in Evans's trial: two workmen were willing to testify that there were no bodies in the wash-house when they worked there several days after Evans supposedly hid them. They stored their tools in the wash-room (a small outhouse measuring 54 by 52 inches (140 by 130 cm)) and cleaned it out completely when they finished their work on 11 November. Their evidence in itself would have raised doubts about the veracity of Evans's alleged confessions, but the workmen were not called to give evidence. Indeed, the police re-interviewed the workmen and forced them to change their evidence to fit the preconceived idea that Evans was the sole murderer. The murderer, Christie, would have hidden the bodies of Beryl and Geraldine in the temporarily vacant first-floor flat, and then moved them to the wash-house four days later when the workmen had finished.

== John Christie ==
Three years later, Christie vacated his premises at 10 Rillington Place and the landlord allowed an upstairs tenant, Beresford Brown, to use Christie's kitchen. Brown found the bodies of three women (Kathleen Maloney, Rita Nelson and Hectorina Maclennan) hidden in a papered-over kitchen pantry, a recess immediately next to the wash-house where Beryl and Geraldine Evans had been found. A further search of the building and grounds turned up three more bodies: Christie's wife, Ethel, under the floorboards of the front room; Ruth Fuerst, an Austrian nurse and munitions worker; and Muriel Eady, a former colleague of Christie, who were both buried in the right-hand side of the small back garden of the building. Christie had even used one of their thigh bones to prop up a trellis in the garden, which the police had missed in their earlier searches of the property.

Christie was arrested on 31 March 1953, and during the course of interrogation confessed four separate times to killing Beryl Evans, although he never admitted to killing Geraldine Evans. He confessed to murdering Fuerst and Eady, saying he had stored their bodies in the wash-room before burying them in shallow graves in the garden. It was in the same wash-room that the bodies of Beryl and Geraldine Evans had been found during the investigation into their murders. Christie was found guilty of murdering his wife and was hanged on 15 July 1953 by Albert Pierrepoint, the same hangman who had executed Evans at the same prison three years prior.

Because Christie's crimes raised doubts about Evans's guilt in the murders of his wife and daughter, the serving Home Secretary, David Maxwell-Fyfe, commissioned an inquiry to investigate the possibility of a miscarriage of justice. It was chaired by the Recorder of Portsmouth, John Scott Henderson, QC. The inquiry ran for one week and its findings upheld Evans's guilt in both murders with the explanation that Christie's confessions of murdering Beryl Evans were unreliable because they were made in the context of supporting his defence that he was insane. The conclusion was met with scepticism by the press and the public alike: if Christie's confessions were unreliable, why should those of Evans be acceptable? The inquiry ignored vital evidence and led to more questions in Parliament, especially from Geoffrey Bing, Reginald Paget, Sydney Silverman, Michael Foot and many other MPs. The controversy was to continue until it led eventually to the exculpation of Evans and a declaration of his innocence of the murder of both his wife and his daughter.

The murder of Beryl Evans was never a primary charge in the trials of either Evans or Christie. The former had been charged with the murder of his daughter and the latter with the murder of Mrs. Christie. Hence questions that went to the murder of Mrs. Evans were not those with which the trials were especially concerned. When Christie was later the subject of the Scott Henderson Inquiry, questions drafted by a solicitor representing Evans's mother were deemed not relevant and Scott Henderson retained the right of deciding if they could be asked.

== Campaign to overturn Evans's conviction ==
In 1955, David Astor, editor of The Observer, Ian Gilmour, editor of The Spectator, John Grigg, editor of The National and English Review, and Sir Lynton Andrews, editor of The Yorkshire Post, formed a delegation to petition the Home Secretary for a new inquiry because of their dissatisfaction with the conclusions of the Scott Henderson Inquiry. In the same year, barrister Michael Eddowes examined the case and wrote the book The Man on Your Conscience, which argued that Evans could not have been the killer on the basis that if he were, there were a number of extraordinary coincidences with his crimes and Christie's, most notably that two strangler murderers, who both used a ligature to kill their victims, had been living in the same property at the same time, unknown to each other.

The television journalist Ludovic Kennedy's book Ten Rillington Place criticised the police investigation and evidence submitted at the 1950 trial in which Evans was found guilty. This produced another Parliamentary debate in 1961 but still no second inquiry.

In 1965, Liberal Party politician Herbert Wolfe of Darlington, County Durham contacted Harold Evans, then editor of The Northern Echo. He and Kennedy formed the Timothy Evans Committee. The result of a prolonged campaign was that the Home Secretary, Sir Frank Soskice, ordered a new inquiry chaired by High Court judge Sir Daniel Brabin in 1965–66. Brabin found it was "more probable than not" that Evans murdered his wife and that he did not murder his daughter. This was contrary to the prosecution case in Evans's trial, which held that both murders had been committed by the same person as a single act. The victims' bodies had been found together in the same location and had been murdered in the same way by strangulation.

Brabin went to great lengths to prefer police evidence wherever possible and exonerate them of any misconduct, and he did not address the allegations made by Kennedy about the validity of several of the confessions allegedly made by Evans. He also did not consider the incompetence of the police in their searches of the garden at Rillington Place. The enquiry did little to settle the many issues which arose from the case, but, by exonerating Evans of killing his child, was crucial in subsequent events.

Since Evans had only been convicted of his daughter's murder, Roy Jenkins, Soskice's successor as Home Secretary, recommended a royal pardon for Evans, which was granted in October 1966. In 1965, Evans's remains were exhumed from Pentonville Prison and reburied in St Patrick's Roman Catholic Cemetery in Leytonstone, Greater London. The outcry over the Evans case contributed to the suspension and then abolition of capital punishment in the United Kingdom.

== Status of Evans's guilty verdict ==
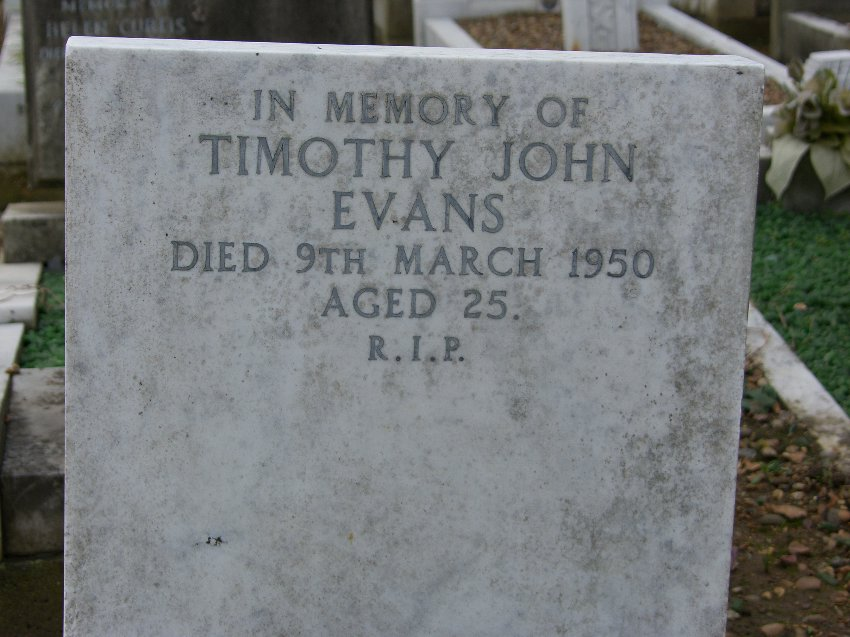
The grave of Evans

In January 2003, the Home Office awarded Evans's half-sister, Mary Westlake, and his sister, Eileen Ashby, ex gratia payments as compensation for the miscarriage of justice in Evans's trial. The independent assessor for the Home Office, Lord Brennan QC, accepted that "the conviction and execution of Timothy Evans for the murder of his child was wrongful and a miscarriage of justice" and that "there is no evidence to implicate Timothy Evans in the murder of his wife. She was most probably murdered by Christie." Lord Brennan believed that the Brabin Report's conclusion that Evans probably murdered his wife should be rejected given Christie's confessions and conviction.

On 16 November 2004, Westlake began an application for judicial review in the High Court, challenging a decision by the Criminal Cases Review Commission not to refer Evans's case to the Court of Appeal to have his conviction formally quashed. She argued that Evans's pardon had not formally expunged his conviction of murdering his daughter, and although the Brabin report had concluded that Evans probably did not kill his daughter, it had not declared him innocent. The report also contained the "devastating" conclusion that Evans had probably killed his wife. The request to refer the case was dismissed on 19 November 2004, with the judges saying that the cost and resources of quashing the conviction could not be justified, as there is no "tangible benefit" when "the convicted person has been executed and there are no other penalties ensuing", although they believe "Timothy Evans should indeed be regarded as having been innocent of the charge of which he was convicted."

== In media ==
- Ewan MacColl wrote the song "The Ballad of Tim Evans" (also known as "Go Down You Murderer") about the case. MacColl said in his autobiography that the song was used in many news programmes and documentaries, but that many broadcasters were uncomfortable with the last verse which reads "They sent Tim Evans to the drop for a crime he did not do / It was Christie was the murderer and the judge and jury too." In some recordings of the song, this is altered to: "It was Christie was the murderer and everybody knew / They sent Tim Evans to the drop for a crime he didn't do." The song was covered by the American folk singer Judy Collins. Irish folk singer Christy Moore also covered the song.
- The film 10 Rillington Place was released in the UK on 10 February 1971. It was directed by Richard Fleischer and starred Richard Attenborough as John Christie, Judy Geeson as Beryl Evans, John Hurt as Timothy Evans, and Pat Heywood as Ethel Christie.
- In the 2016 BBC dramatisation Rillington Place, Evans was portrayed by Nico Mirallegro.
- According to Yes Minister co-writer Antony Jay, the Evans case was part of the inspiration for the television satire because of Frank Soskice's refusal to reopen the case despite having himself appealed for an inquiry while in opposition.
- "The Ballad of Tim Evans" is used as background in a scene in A Bucket of Blood and performed by actor and musician Alex Hassilev.

== See also ==
- Forensic linguistics
- Francis Camps
- List of miscarriage of justice cases
- Mahmood Hussein Mattan, who was also wrongfully executed in the United Kingdom
- Philip Allen, Baron Allen of Abbeydale

== Bibliography ==
- Report of an inquiry into certain matters arising out of the deaths of Mrs. Beryl Evans and of Geraldine Evans and out of the conviction of Timothy John Evans of the murder of Geraldine Evans. Report by Mr. J. Scott Henderson, Q.C. Cmd. 8896. HMSO, July 1953.
- The case of Timothy John Evans. Supplementary Report by Mr. J. Scott Henderson, Q.C. Cmd. 8946. HMSO, September 1953.
- Michael Eddowes, The Man on Your Conscience: An Investigation of the Evans Murder Trial, Cassell and Co (1955).
- Jesse, F. Tennyson (1957). The Trials of Timothy John Evans and John Reginald Halliday Christie. Notable Trials series, William Hodge.
- Ludovic Kennedy (1961). Ten Rillington Place. London: Victor Gollancz Ltd.
- The case of Timothy John Evans. Report of an Inquiry by The Hon. Mr. Justice Brabin. Cmnd. 3101. HMSO, October 1966.
- Daniel Brabin (1999). Rillington Place. London: The Stationery Office. ISBN 978-0-11-702417-5.
- John Eddowes (1995). The Two Killers of Rillington Place. London: Warner Books. ISBN 978-0-7515-1285-4.
- Edward Marston (2007). John Christie. Surrey: The National Archives. ISBN 978-1-905615-16-2.
- Jonathan Oates (2012). John Christie of Rillington Place. Barnsley: Wharncliffe True Crime.
- Norman Morgan (2023). Build Up (2 volumes). Cirencester: Mereo Books.
