= Daniel Brabin =

English High Court judge

Sir Daniel James Brabin MC (14 August 1913 – 22 September 1975) was a judge of the High Court of England from 1962 until his death.

== Biography ==
Son of William Henry Brabin, and educated at the Douai School and Trinity Hall, Cambridge, he was a pupil of Lord Shawcross, and was called to the Bar from the Inner Temple in 1936, being appointed King's Counsel in 1951 and a bencher of the Inner Temple in 1960. Brabin served with the Royal Artillery during the Second World War, receiving a commission to second lieutenant from gunner on 11 May 1940, and was awarded the Military Cross in 1945. He was knighted in 1962.

== Notable cases ==
=== Timothy Evans murder case ===
He was appointed by Home Secretary Frank Soskice to conduct the inquiry into the Timothy Evans/John Christie murder miscarriage of justice case, which was conducted over the winter of 1965–66. Timothy Evans had been hanged in 1950 for the murder of his small child, Geraldine, after a trial in which his then neighbour in the same building, John Christie, testified against him. Three years later, Christie was found guilty of multiple murders of women in the same property, 10 Rillington Place, and he himself was tried for murder, found guilty and hanged. Before he died, he admitted to killing Beryl, the wife of Timothy Evans and mother of Geraldine, raising the possibility that he had also been responsible for murdering Geraldine and that Evans had been wrongfully executed.

Brabin found it was "more probable than not" that Evans murdered his wife and that he did not murder his daughter. This was contrary to the prosecution case in Evans's trial, which held that both murders had been committed by the same person as a single act. The victims' bodies had been found together in the same location and had been murdered in the same way by strangulation. Brabin went to great lengths to prefer police evidence wherever possible, and exonerate them of any police misconduct (such as possible threats of violence against Evans during his interrogation), and he failed to address the allegations made by Ludovic Kennedy about the validity of several of the confessions allegedly made by Evans. He never considered the incompetence of the police in their searches of the garden at 10 Rillington Place who failed to uncover the buried skeletal remains of two of Christie's previous victims, one of whose femurs he had used as a fence prop. Had these been discovered during the original criminal investigation, Evans almost certainly would not have been convicted and hanged as Christie would have been the prime suspect. The enquiry did little to settle the many issues which arose from the case, but, by exonerating Evans of killing his child, was crucial in subsequent events.

Since Evans had only been convicted of the murder of his daughter, Roy Jenkins, Soskice's successor as Home Secretary, recommended a royal pardon for Evans, which was granted in October 1966. In 1965 Evans' remains had been exhumed from Pentonville Prison and reburied in St Patrick's Roman Catholic Cemetery in Leytonstone, Greater London. The outcry over the Evans case contributed to the suspension and then abolition of capital punishment in the United Kingdom.

=== R v Commissioner of Metropolitan Police, ex parte Blackburn ===
Brabin ruled in R v Commissioner of Metropolitan Police, ex parte Blackburn on the duty of the Crown to prosecute. The case was described as follows: "A and B are alleged to have committed a crime. A is charged with the crime, convicted and sentenced. B is not charged. At the trial of A there is evidence which suggests that B may have committed or been a participant to the crime. Can the prosecution be compelled to prosecute B?" In 1968, the Court of Queen's Bench of Widgery CJ, Melford Stevenson and Brabin issued judgment that "to prosecute must indisputably be a matter of discretion", and that "No minister of the Crown can tell (the Commissioner) that he must, or must not, keep observation on this place or that; or that he must, or must not, prosecute this man or that one. Nor can any police authority tell him so. The responsibility for law enforcement lies on him. He is answerable to the law and to the law alone."

In 1972, this judgment was affirmed by the Court of Appeal, in a separate judgment against Blackburn on another matter. The original Blackburn case in 1968 dealt with Blackburn's allegations of an illegal London gambling establishment, whereas in Autumn 1972 he brought an action for mandamus for failure to arrest on pornography laws, which was later decided in the Court of Appeal.

The case was noted as recently as the 1998 decision of the Lords Regina v. Chief Constable of Sussex Ex Parte International Trader's Ferry Limited 1998 UKHL 40, concerning police protection for the customers of ITF, a company involved in the export of livestock through the port of Shoreham, during the early months of 1995 when animal rights protesters were trying to stop the trade.
