= Wilfrid Lewis =

British barrister and ecclesiastical lawyer

Sir Wilfrid Lewis OBE, DL

Justice of the High Court
- In office 1935–1950

Personal details
- Born: 9 February 1881
- Died: 15 March 1950 (aged 69)
- Education: Eton College; University College, Oxford

Sir Wilfrid Hubert Poyer Lewis (9 February 1881 – 15 March 1950) was a British barrister and ecclesiastical lawyer. He served as Junior Counsel to the Treasury (Common Law) (one of the British government's most senior lawyers) from 1930 to 1935. Then, from 1935 until his death, he was a Judge of the High Court of Justice. He presided over the trial of the alleged murderer Timothy Evans in January 1950, two months before his death.

== Life ==
Lewis was born on 9 February 1881 in London, England. He was the son of Arthur Griffith Poyer Lewis, a barrister, and Annie Wilhelmine, née Ellison. His grandfather was Richard Lewis, Bishop of Llandaff. He was educated at Eton College and University College, Oxford, where he took a Third in Modern History.

After reading in the chambers of John Simon and John Sankey, he was called to the Bar by the Inner Temple in 1908, and began practising at Cardiff. During World War I, he was commissioned into the Glamorgan Yeomanry, and served as aide-de-camp to Sir Charles Fergusson in France. He was twice mentioned in dispatches and appointed OBE.

After the war, he joined the chambers of Thomas Inskip in London, gaining a large practice. In 1930, he was appointed Junior Counsel to the Treasury (Common Law) (commonly known as the 'Treasury Devil'). In 1935, in succession to Mr Justice Avory, Lewis was appointed a Justice of the High Court, assigned to the King's Bench Division, and received the customary knighthood. At Caernarfon, he heard the case of the burning of the aerodrome at Penyberth in September 1936 by Saunders Lewis and two other prominent members of Plaid Cymru, the Fire in Llŷn or Tân yn Llŷn. The jury failed to agree on a verdict.
