= John Christie (serial killer) =

English serial killer (1899–1953)

- Born: John Reginald Halliday Christie; 8 April 1899; Boothtown, West Riding of Yorkshire, England
- Died: 15 July 1953 (aged 54); HM Prison Pentonville, London, England
- Cause of death: Execution by hanging
- Resting place: HM Prison Pentonville, London, England
- Other names: The Rillington Place Strangler, The Monster of Rillington Place
- Known for: Serial murders, framing Timothy Evans
- Conviction: Murder
- Penalty: Death

Details
- Victims: 8+
- Span of crimes: 24 August 1943 – 6 March 1953
- Country: England
- Date apprehended: 31 March 1953

John Reginald Halliday Christie (8 April 1899 – 15 July 1953) was an English serial killer and serial rapist active during the 1940s and early 1950s. He murdered at least eight people—including his wife Ethel—by strangling them inside his flat at 10 Rillington Place, Notting Hill, London. The bodies of three of his victims were found in a wallpaper-covered kitchen alcove soon after he had moved out of Rillington Place during March 1953. The remains of two more victims were discovered in the garden, and his wife's body was found beneath the floorboards in the front room. Christie was convicted of and hanged for his wife's murder.

Two of Christie's victims were Beryl Evans and her baby daughter Geraldine, who, along with Beryl's husband Timothy Evans, were tenants at 10 Rillington Place during 1948–49. Timothy Evans was charged with both murders, found guilty of the murder of his daughter and hanged in 1950. Christie was a major prosecution witness; when his own crimes were discovered three years later, serious doubts were raised about the integrity of Timothy Evans' conviction. Christie subsequently admitted killing Beryl but not Geraldine. It is now generally accepted that Christie murdered both victims and that police mishandling of the original inquiry allowed Christie to escape detection and commit a further four murders. In 2004 the High Court acknowledged that Timothy Evans did not murder either his wife or his child.

== Early life ==
John Christie was born on 8 April 1899 in Chester Road, Boothtown, near Halifax in the West Riding of Yorkshire, the sixth of seven children. He had a troubled relationship with his father, carpet designer Ernest John Christie, an austere and uncommunicative man who displayed little emotion towards his children and would punish them for trivial offences. Christie was also alternately coddled and bullied by his mother and older sisters. On 24 March 1911, Christie's grandfather David Halliday died aged 75 in Christie's house after a long illness. Christie later said that seeing his grandfather's body laid out on a trestle table gave him a feeling of power and well-being; a man he had once feared was now only a corpse.

At age 11, Christie won a scholarship to Halifax Secondary School, where his favourite subject was mathematics, particularly algebra. He was also good at history and woodwork. It was later found that Christie had an IQ of 128. He also attended Boothtown Council School (also known as Boothtown Board School) in Northowram. Christie sang in the church choir and was a Scout. After leaving school on 22 April 1913, he entered employment as an assistant projectionist.

During his later life, Christie's childhood peers described him as "a queer lad" who "kept himself to himself" and "was not very popular." His problem with impotence began in adolescence; his first attempts at sex were failures, and he was branded "Reggie-No-Dick" and "Can't-Do-It-Christie" by his peers. Christie's sexual difficulties were life-long; most of the time he could only perform with prostitutes. A post-mortem found Christie's genitals were physically normal.

In September 1916, during the First World War, Christie enlisted in the British Army; he was called up on 12 April 1917 to join the 52nd Nottinghamshire and Derbyshire Regiment to serve as an infantryman. In April 1918, the regiment was despatched to France, where Christie was seconded to the Duke of Wellington's Regiment as a signalman. During the following June, Christie was injured in a mustard gas attack and spent a month in a military hospital in Calais. He later claimed this attack had rendered him blind and mute for three and a half years, and permanently affected his ability to speak loudly. Ludovic Kennedy wrote that no record of Christie's blindness has been traced and that, while he might have lost his voice when he was admitted to hospital, he would not have been discharged as fit for duty had he remained mute. His inability to talk loudly, Kennedy argued, was a psychological reaction rather than a lasting toxic effect of the gas. The reaction, and Christie's exaggeration of the effects, stemmed from an underlying histrionic personality disorder causing him to exaggerate or feign illness to get attention and sympathy.

Christie was demobilised from the army on 22 October 1919. He joined the Royal Air Force on 13 December 1923 and was discharged on 15 August 1924.

== Marriage ==
Christie married Ethel Simpson, from Bradford, at Halifax register office on 10 May 1920. His impotence remained and he continued to visit prostitutes. Early in the marriage, Ethel suffered a miscarriage. The couple separated after four years. Ethel worked at the Garside Engineering Co, and later at the English Electrical Co, in Bradford, until 1928 when she and her siblings moved to Sheffield. In 1923, Christie moved to London; he spent the next decade in and out of prison while Ethel remained in Yorkshire with her relatives. He was released from prison in January 1934, when the couple reunited and moved into 10 Rillington Place.

== Early criminal activity ==
During the first decade of his marriage to Ethel, Christie was convicted of several criminal offences. He began working as a postman on 10 January 1921 in Halifax, and his first conviction was for stealing postal orders on 20 February and 26 March, for which he received three months' imprisonment on 12 April 1921. He served his sentence at HM Prison Manchester and was released on 27 June. Christie was then convicted on 15 January 1923 of obtaining money on false pretences and of violent conduct, for which, respectively, he was bound over and placed on probation for twelve months. He committed two further crimes of larceny during 1924, and received consecutive sentences of three and six months' imprisonment on 22 September 1924 in HM Prison Wandsworth. On 13 May 1929, after working for over two years as a lorry driver, Christie was convicted of assaulting Maud Cole, with whom he was living at 6 Almeric Road in Battersea, and was sentenced to six months' hard labour; he had hit Cole over the head with a cricket bat, which the magistrate described as a "murderous attack" for which he was again sent to HM Prison Wandsworth. Finally, Christie was convicted of car theft and was re-imprisoned at Wandsworth for three months on 1 November 1933.

Christie and Ethel were reconciled in 1934 after he was released from prison, but he continued to patronise prostitutes. He ended his recourse to petty crime. In 1937, the Christies moved into the top-floor flat of 10 Rillington Place in Notting Hill, then a rather run-down area of London; they later moved into the ground-floor flat in December 1938. The residence was a three-storey brick end-terrace, built in the 1870s during a period of intensive speculative building in the area resulting in much jerry-built property which declined into poorly maintained and unimproved multi-occupancy rentals. Number 10 was of a common design: the ground and first floors each contained a bedroom and living room, with a kitchen/scullery in the adjacent extension, but the second floor flat had two rooms only: a kitchen/living room and a bedroom. Living conditions were "squalid"—the building's occupants shared one outside lavatory, and none of the flats had a bathroom.

Christie spent three years as a foreman at the Commodore Cinema in King Street, Hammersmith, then in summer 1939 successfully applied to become a War Reserve Constable (WRC), since the authorities seem to have been overwhelmed by the substantial influx of new recruits and thus unable to check applicants' backgrounds and criminal records. He began as a WRC on 1 September 1939 and was assigned to the Harrow Road police station, where he met a woman named Gladys Jones with whom he began an affair. Their relationship lasted until mid-1943, when the woman's husband, a serving soldier, returned from the war. After learning of the affair, Jones' husband went to the house where his wife was living, discovered Christie there and beat him up.

== Murders ==
Christie committed his murders between 1943 and 1953, usually by strangling his victims after he had rendered them unconscious with domestic gas (containing carbon monoxide); some he raped as they lay unconscious.

=== First murders ===
Christie's first admitted victim was Ruth Fuerst, a 21-year-old Austrian munitions worker who supplemented her income by occasionally engaging in prostitution. Christie claimed to have met Fuerst while she was soliciting clients in a snack bar in Ladbroke Grove. According to his own statements, on 24 August 1943, he invited Fuerst to his home to have sex with her (his wife was visiting relatives at the time). Afterwards, Christie impulsively strangled her on his bed with a length of rope. He initially stowed Fuerst's body beneath the floorboards of his living room, then buried it in the back garden the following evening. On 28 December the same year Christie resigned as a reserve constable; his service index card is now in the collection of the Metropolitan Police Museum, whilst evidence from his murders now forms part of the Crime Museum collections.

The following year he found new employment as a clerk at an Acton radio factory. There he met his second victim, colleague Muriel Amelia Eady. On 7 October 1944, Christie invited Eady back to his flat with the promise that he had concocted a "special mixture" that could cure her bronchitis. Eady was to inhale the mixture from a jar with a tube inserted in the top. In reality, the mixture was Friar's Balsam, which Christie used to disguise the smell of domestic gas. Once Eady was seated breathing the mixture from the tube with her back turned, Christie inserted a second tube into the jar connected to a gas tap. As Eady continued breathing, she inhaled the domestic gas, which soon rendered her unconscious; domestic gas during the 1940s was coal gas, which had a carbon monoxide content of 15%. Christie raped and strangled Eady before burying her alongside Fuerst.

=== Murders of Beryl and Geraldine Evans ===
During Easter of 1948, Timothy Evans and his wife Beryl moved into the top-floor flat at 10 Rillington Place, where Beryl gave birth that October to their daughter, Geraldine. In late 1949, Evans informed police that his wife was dead. A police search of the building failed to find her body, but a later search revealed the bodies of Beryl, Geraldine and a 16-week male foetus in an outdoor wash-house. Beryl's body had been wrapped twice, in a blanket and then a tablecloth. The post-mortem revealed that both mother and daughter had been strangled and that Beryl had been physically assaulted before her death, shown by facial bruising. Evans initially claimed that Christie had killed his wife in a botched abortion operation, but police questioning eventually produced a confession. The alleged confession may have been fabricated by police as the statement appears contrived and artificial. After being charged, Evans withdrew his confession and once again accused Christie, this time of both murders.

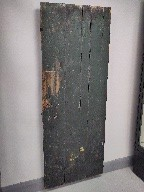
Wash-house door from 10 Rillington Place in the Metropolitan Police Crime Museum 150th Anniversary display

On 11 January 1950, Evans was put on trial for the murder of his daughter, the prosecution having decided not to pursue a second charge of murdering his wife. Christie was a principal witness for the Crown: he denied Evans' accusations and gave detailed evidence about the quarrels between him and his wife. The jury found Evans guilty despite the revelation of Christie's criminal record of theft and violence. Evans was originally due to be hanged on 31 January, but appealed. After his appeal on 20 February had failed, Evans was hanged at HM Prison Pentonville on 9 March 1950.

At the time of Evans' trial, Christie had found a job at the Post Office Savings Bank on 21 May 1946 as a Grade 2 Clerk and worked at Kew. He was sacked when his past criminal record came to light, leaving on 4 April 1950.

=== Mistakes in the investigation ===
Police made several mistakes in their handling of the Evans case, especially in overlooking the remains of Christie's previous murder victims in the garden at 10 Rillington Place; one femur was later found propping up a fence. The garden of the property was very small, about 16 by 14 feet (4.9 by 4.3 m), and the fence was parallel to the wash-house where the bodies of Beryl and Geraldine were later found. Several searches were made at the house after Evans confessed to placing his wife's remains in the drains, but the three policemen conducting the search did not go into the washhouse. The garden was apparently examined but was not excavated at this point.

Christie later admitted that his dog had unearthed Eady's skull in the garden shortly after these police searches; he threw the skull into an abandoned bombed-out house in nearby St. Marks Road. There was clearly no systematic search made of the crime scene, in which this or other human remains would have been found and pointed to Christie as the perpetrator. Several police searches of the property showed a complete lack of expertise in handling forensic evidence and were quite superficial at best. Had the searches been conducted effectively, the investigation would have exposed Christie as a murderer, and the lives of Evans and four women would have been saved.

The evidence of builders working at 10 Rillington Place was ignored, and their interviews with Evans suggest that police had concocted a false confession. It should have been clear from the first statement made by Evans on 30 November 1949 that he was ignorant of the resting place of the body of his wife or how she had been killed. He claimed that his wife's body was in either a manhole or a drain at the front of the house, but a police search failed to find remains there. That should have prompted a thorough search of the residence, washhouse and garden, but no further action was taken until later, when the two bodies were found in the washhouse. Evans was also unaware at his first interview that his daughter had been killed.

The police interrogation in London was mishandled from the start, when Evans was shown the clothes of his wife and baby and was informed that they had been found in the washhouse. Such information should have been kept from him so as to force him to tell police where the bodies had been concealed. The several apparent "confessions" contain questionable words and phrases in high-register language such as "terrific argument" which seem out of place for a distressed, uneducated, working-class young man such as Evans and bear no relation to what he probably said. These were almost certainly inventions made much later by police, according to comments made by Ludovic Kennedy long after the truth about Christie had emerged.

Police accepted all of Christie's statements as true without much scrutiny, and he was the crucial witness at Evans' trial. As Kennedy wrote, police accepted Christie, a former war reserve constable, as one of their own, largely taking what he said at face value without any further investigation. Bearing in mind that he had criminal convictions for theft and malicious wounding (while Evans had no convictions for violence), the reliance on his testimony was questionable. It is significant that Christie had claimed to be an abortionist prior to his meeting the Evanses, having said so to a colleague in 1947. He also repeated this claim after Evans' trial to women he spoke to in cafés, whom he possibly regarded as potential victims. Such an approach aligns with Christie's modus operandi of offering help to women so as to gain their confidence and lure them back to his flat, as demonstrated in Eady's case.

Nearly three years passed without major incident for Christie after Evans' trial. He soon found alternative employment as a clerk with the British Road Services at their Shepherd's Bush depot, starting work there on 12 June 1950. At the same time, new tenants arrived to fill the vacant first- and second-floor rooms at 10 Rillington Place. The tenants were predominantly migrants from the West Indies; this horrified Christie and his wife, who both held racist attitudes towards their neighbours and disliked living with them. Tensions between the new tenants and the Christies came to a head when Ethel reported one of her neighbours for assault. Christie negotiated with the Poor Man's Lawyer Centre to continue to have exclusive use of the back garden, ostensibly to have space between him and his neighbours but quite possibly to prevent anyone from uncovering the human remains buried there.

=== Murder of Ethel Christie ===
On the morning of 14 December 1952, Christie strangled Ethel in bed. She had last been seen in public two days earlier. Christie invented several stories to explain her disappearance and to help mitigate the possibility of further inquiries being made. In reply to a letter from relatives in Sheffield, he wrote that Ethel had rheumatism and could not write herself; to one neighbour, he explained that she was visiting her relatives in Sheffield; to another, he said that she had gone to Birmingham. Christie had resigned from his job at Shepherd's Bush on 6 December and had been unemployed since then.

To support himself, he sold his wife's wedding ring and watch on 17 December for £2 10s and furniture on 8 January 1953 for which he received £11; he kept cutlery, two chairs, a mattress and his kitchen table. From 23 January to 20 March, he received his weekly unemployment benefit of £3 12s. On 26 January 1953, Christie forged Ethel's signature and emptied her bank account. On 27 February 1953, Christie sold some of his wife's clothing for £3 5s. He also received a cheque for £8 on 7 March from the Bradford Clothing and Supply Company.

=== Further murders ===
Between 19 January and 6 March 1953, Christie murdered three more women he invited back to 10 Rillington Place: Kathleen Maloney, Rita Nelson and Hectorina MacLennan. Maloney was a sex worker from the Ladbroke Grove area. Nelson was from Belfast and was visiting her sister in Ladbroke Grove; she was six months pregnant at the time she encountered Christie. Christie first met MacLennan, who was living in London with her boyfriend, Alex Baker, in a café. All three met on several occasions after this and Christie let MacLennan and Baker stay at Rillington Place while they were looking for accommodation. On another occasion, Christie met MacLennan on her own and persuaded her to come back to his flat, where he murdered her. Later he convinced Baker, who came to Rillington Place looking for MacLennan, that he had not seen her. Christie kept up the pretence for several days, meeting Baker regularly to see if he had news of MacLennan's whereabouts and to help him search for her.

For the murders of his final three victims, Christie modified the gassing technique he had first used on Eady; he used a rubber tube connected to the gas pipe in the kitchen which he kept closed off with a bulldog clip. He seated his victims in the kitchen, released the clip on the tube and let gas leak into the room. The Brabin Report pointed out that Christie's explanation of his gassing technique was not satisfactory because he would have been overpowered by the gas as well. It was established that all three victims had been exposed to carbon monoxide. The gas made his victims drowsy, after which Christie strangled them with a length of rope.

As with Eady, Christie repeatedly raped his last three victims while they were unconscious and continued to do so as they died. When this aspect of his crimes was publicly revealed, Christie quickly gained a reputation for being a necrophiliac. One commentator has cautioned against categorising Christie as such; according to the accounts he gave to police, he did not engage sexually with any of his victims exclusively after death. After Christie had murdered each of his victims by ligature strangulation, he placed a vest or other cloth-like material between their legs before wrapping their semi-naked bodies in blankets (in a similar manner to the way in which Beryl's body had been wrapped), then stowing their bodies in a small alcove behind the back kitchen wall. He later covered the entrance to this alcove with wallpaper.

== Arrest ==
Christie moved out of 10 Rillington Place on 20 March 1953 after fraudulently sub-letting his flat to a couple from whom he took £7 13s 0d (£7.65 or about £186 as of 2025). The landlord visited that same evening and, finding the couple there instead of Christie, demanded that they leave first thing in the morning. The landlord allowed the tenant of the top-floor flat, Beresford Brown, to use Christie's kitchen. On 24 March, Brown discovered the kitchen alcove when he attempted to insert brackets into the wall to hold a wireless set. Peeling back the wallpaper, Brown saw the bodies of Maloney, Nelson and MacLennan. After getting confirmation from another tenant in Rillington Place that there were dead bodies, Brown informed police and a citywide search for Christie began.

After leaving Rillington Place, Christie had gone to a Rowton House in King's Cross and booked a room for seven nights under his real name and address. He stayed for only four nights, leaving on 24 March when news broke of the discovery at his flat. Christie wandered around London, slept rough and spent much of the day in cafés and cinemas. On 28 March, he pawned his watch in Battersea for 10s. On the morning of 31 March, Christie was arrested on the embankment near Putney Bridge after being challenged about his identity by a police officer, PC Thomas Ledger. When police searched Christie, they discovered an old newspaper clipping about the remand of Timothy Evans among the personal items on him.

== Conviction and execution ==
Christie initially admitted only to the murders of the women in the alcove and of his wife during police questioning. When informed about the skeletons buried in the back garden, he admitted responsibility for their deaths as well. On 27 April 1953, Christie confessed to the murder of Beryl Evans, which Timothy Evans had originally been charged with during the police investigation in 1949, although for the most part, he denied killing Geraldine. On one occasion following his trial, Christie indicated that he may have been responsible for her death as well, having said so to a hospital orderly. It is speculated that Christie would not have wanted to readily admit his guilt in Geraldine's death in order not to alienate the jury from his desire to be found not guilty by reason of insanity and for his safety from fellow inmates. On 5 June 1953, Christie confessed to the murders of Eady and Fuerst, which helped the police identify their skeletons.

Christie was tried only for the murder of his wife Ethel. His trial began on 22 June 1953, in the same court in which Evans had been tried three years earlier. Christie pleaded insanity, with his defence describing him as "Mad as a March hare" and claimed to have a poor memory of the events. Dr Matheson, a doctor at HM Prison Brixton who evaluated Christie, was called as a witness by the prosecution. He testified, using medical terminology of the time, that Christie had a "hysterical personality" but was not insane. The jury rejected Christie's plea and after deliberating for 85 minutes found him guilty. He was sentenced to death by Mr Justice Finnemore.

On 29 June, Christie stated that he would not be making an appeal against his conviction. On 2 July Evans' mother wrote to Christie asking him to "confess all." On 8 July his MP, George Rogers, interviewed Christie for forty-five minutes about the murders. The following day Christie spoke to the Scott Henderson inquiry about the murders. Four days later the Home Secretary, David Maxwell-Fyfe, said that he could not find any grounds, medically or psychologically, for Christie to be reprieved.

Among Christie's final visitors while in the condemned cell were an ex-army friend, Dennis Hague, on 13 July; the prison governor and Christie's sister, Phyllis Clarke, who both visited him on the night before his execution. Rogers also wanted to speak to Christie a second time on the night before his execution, but Christie refused to meet him again. According to both Hague and Clarke, Christie appeared resigned towards his death.

Christie was hanged at 9:00 a.m. on 15 July 1953 at HM Prison Pentonville. His executioner was Albert Pierrepoint, who had hanged Evans. After being pinioned for execution, Christie complained that his nose itched. Pierrepoint mocked him, stating that, "It won't bother you for long." After the execution, Christie's body was buried in an unmarked grave within the precincts of the prison, as was standard practice for executed prisoners in the United Kingdom.

== Victims ==
- Ruth Fuerst, 21 (24 August 1943)
- Muriel Eady, 31 (7 October 1944)
- Beryl Evans, 20 (8 November 1949)
- Geraldine Evans, 13 months (8 November 1949)
- Ethel Christie, 54 (14 December 1952)
- Rita Nelson, 25 (19 January 1953)
- Kathleen Maloney, 26 (February 1953)
- Hectorina MacLennan, 26 (6 March 1953)

=== Other murders ===
Based on the pubic hair that Christie collected, it has been speculated that he was responsible for more murders than those carried out at 10 Rillington Place. He claimed that the four different clumps of hair in his collection came from his wife and the three bodies discovered in the kitchen alcove, but only Ethel matched the hair type on those bodies. Even if two of the others had come from the bodies of Fuerst and Eady, which had by then decomposed into skeletons, there was still one remaining clump of hair unaccounted for—it could not have come from Beryl Evans, as no pubic hair had been removed from her body. Writing in 1978, Professor Keith Simpson, one of the pathologists involved in the forensic examination of Christie's victims, had this to say about the pubic hair collection:

It seems odd that Christie should have said hair came from the bodies in the alcove if in fact it had come from those now reduced to skeletons; not very likely that in his last four murders the only trophy he took was from the one woman with whom he did not have peri-mortal sexual intercourse; and even more odd that one of his trophies had definitely not come from any of the unfortunate women known to have been involved.

No attempts were or have been made to trace any further victims of Christie, such as examining records of missing women in London during his period of activity. Michael Eddowes suggested that Christie had been in a perfect position, as a war reserve constable, to have committed many more murders than have been discovered. The historian Jonathan Oates considers it unlikely Christie had any further victims, arguing he would not have deviated from his standard method of killing in his place of residence.

== Innocence of Timothy Evans ==
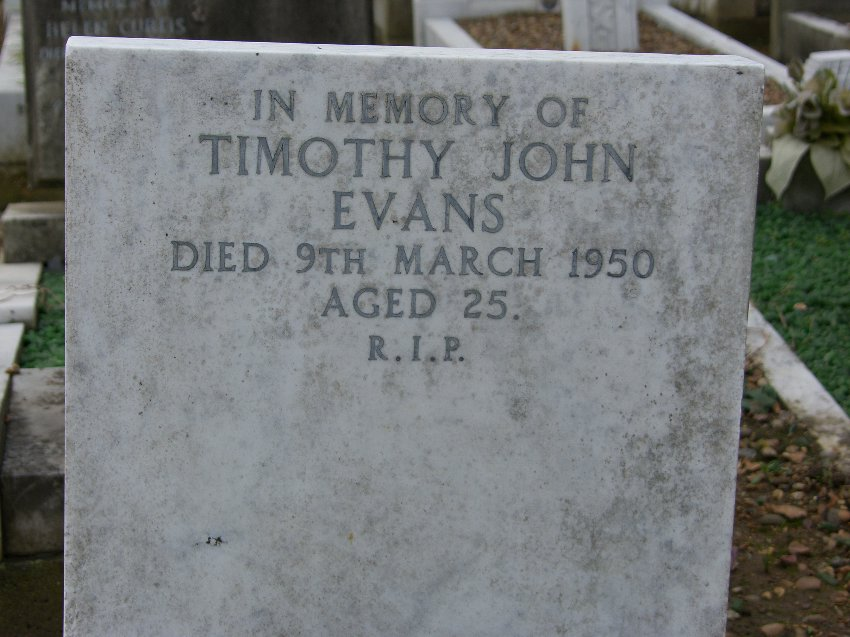
The grave of Timothy Evans, who was executed after being framed for two murders committed by Christie

Following Christie's conviction, there was substantial controversy concerning the earlier trial of Timothy Evans, who had been convicted mainly on the evidence of Christie, who lived in the same property in which Evans had allegedly carried out his crimes. Christie confessed to Beryl's murder and although he neither confessed to nor was charged with Geraldine's murder, he was widely considered guilty of both murders. This cast doubt on the fairness of Evans' trial and raised the possibility that an innocent person had been hanged.

The controversy prompted Maxwell-Fyfe to commission an inquiry led by John Scott Henderson QC, the Recorder of Portsmouth, to determine whether Evans had been innocent and a miscarriage of justice had occurred. Henderson interviewed Christie before his execution, as well as another twenty witnesses who had been involved in either of the police investigations. He concluded that Evans was in fact guilty of both murders and that Christie's confessions to the murder of Beryl were unreliable and made in the context of furthering his own defence that he was insane.

However, questions continued to be raised in Parliament concerning Evans' innocence, parallel with newspaper campaigns and books being published making similar claims. The Henderson Inquiry was criticised for being held over too short a time period (one week) and for being prejudiced against the possibility that Evans was innocent. This controversy, along with the coincidence that two stranglers would have been living in the same property at the same time if Evans and Christie had both been guilty, kept alive concerns that a miscarriage of justice had occurred in Evans' trial.

This uncertainty led to a second inquiry, chaired by High Court judge Sir Daniel Brabin, which was conducted over the winter of 1965–66. Brabin re-examined much of the evidence from both cases and evaluated some of the arguments for Evans' innocence. His conclusions were that it was "more probable than not" that Evans had killed his wife but not his daughter Geraldine, for whose death Christie was responsible. Christie's likely motive was that her presence would have drawn attention to Beryl's disappearance, which Christie would have been averse to as it increased the risk that his own murders would be discovered. Brabin also noted that the uncertainty involved in the case would have prevented a jury from being satisfied beyond reasonable doubt of Evans' guilt had he been re-tried. These conclusions were used by the Home Secretary, Roy Jenkins, to recommend a posthumous pardon for Evans, which was granted, as he had been tried and executed for the murder of his daughter. Jenkins announced the granting of Evans' pardon to the House of Commons on 18 October 1966. Evans' remains were subsequently exhumed and returned to his family, who arranged for him to be reburied in a private grave. Evans' execution and other controversial cases contributed to the 1965 suspension, and subsequent abolition, of capital punishment in the United Kingdom.

In January 2003, the Home Office awarded Evans' half-sister, Mary Westlake, and his sister, Eileen Ashby, ex-gratia payments as compensation for the miscarriage of justice in his trial. The independent assessor for the Home Office, Lord Brennan QC, accepted that "the conviction and execution of Timothy Evans for the murder of his child was wrongful and a miscarriage of justice" and that "there is no evidence to implicate Timothy Evans in the murder of his wife. She was most probably murdered by Christie." Lord Brennan believed that the Brabin Report's conclusion that Evans probably murdered his wife should be rejected given Christie's confessions and conviction.

== Media ==
- In September 1969, the play Christie in Love by Howard Brenton premiered. The play relates Christie's murders and psychological abnormality to violence and sadistic personality disorder in society as a whole. It has been revived several times.
- Christie's murders were dramatised in the film 10 Rillington Place (1971), starring Richard Attenborough as Christie. Attenborough spoke of his ambivalence concerning the role: "I do not like playing the part, but I accepted it at once without seeing the script. I have never felt so totally involved in any part as this. It is a most devastating statement on capital punishment." The film also starred Judy Geeson as Beryl Evans, John Hurt as Timothy Evans and Pat Heywood as Ethel Christie.
- It is mentioned in the 2022 crime comedy film See How They Run that the police force are busy dealing with the "Rillington Place" murders. In addition, when constable Stalker is calling women from the victim's little black book, she calls a Beryl and a Geraldine. Finally, the original star of The Mousetrap (the actual Agatha Christie murder mystery play that much of the movie revolves around) is Richard Attenborough, here played by Harris Dickinson.
- A three-part BBC biographical crime drama focused on the Christie murders. This series, Rillington Place, was broadcast between November and December 2016 with Tim Roth as John Christie, Samantha Morton as Ethel Christie, Jodie Comer as Beryl Evans and Nico Mirallegro as Timothy Evans.
- Australian artist Brett Whiteley produced a series of paintings based on the Christie murders while living in London in the 1960s.
- In Ruth Rendell's 2004 novel Thirteen Steps Down, the protagonist has an obsession with Christie, causing the eventual conflict in the plot.
- True crime author Kate Summerscale's 2024 book The Peepshow: The Murders at 10 Rillington Place suggests a new solution to the case.

== See also ==
- List of miscarriage of justice cases
- List of serial killers in the United Kingdom
- Murder in English law
- Volunteer (capital punishment)

== Bibliography ==
- Brabin, Daniel (1999). Rillington Place. London: The Stationery Office. ISBN 978-0-11-702417-5.
- Dawson, Kate Winkler (2017). Death in the Air: The True Story of a Serial Killer, the Great London Smog, and the Strangling of a City. New York: Hachette Books. ISBN 978-0-316-50686-1.
- Eddowes, John (1995). The Two Killers of Rillington Place. London: Warner Books. ISBN 978-0-7515-1285-4.
- Eddowes, Michael (1955). The Man On Your Conscience. London: Cassell & Co.
- Gammon, Edna (2011). A House to Remember: 10 Rillington Place. Memoirs Books. ISBN 978-1-908-22338-8.
- Honeycombe, Gordon (1982). The Murders of the Black Museum: 1870 - 1970. Bloomsbury Books. ISBN 978-1-85471-160-1.
- Kennedy, Ludovic (1961). Ten Rillington Place. London: Victor Gollancz. ISBN 978-0-58603-428-6.
- Lane, Brian (1993). Chronicle of 20th Century Murder. Virgin Publishing. ISBN 978-1-85227-436-8.
- Marston, Edward (2007). John Christie. Surrey: The National Archives. ISBN 978-1-905615-16-2.
- Oates, Jonathan (2013). John Christie of Rillington Place: Biography of a Serial Killer. Barnsley: Pen & Sword Books Ltd. ISBN 9781781592885.
- Root, Neil (2011). Frenzy!: Heath, Haigh & Christie: The First Great Tabloid Murderers. Preface Publishing. ISBN 978-1848093171.
- Simpson, Keith (1978). Forty Years of Murder: An Autobiography. London: Harrap. ISBN 978-0-245-53198-9.
- Summerscale, Kate (2024). The Peepshow:The Murders at 10 Rillington Place. London: Bloomsbury. ISBN 978-152-6-660-480.
