= Brian Lewis (PR executive) =

American television executive

- Born: June 25, 1958 (age 68); New York City, U.S.
- Education: St. John's University (New York City); Fairleigh Dickinson University
- Occupation: Former Executive Vice President of Fox News
- Spouse: Susan Lampasona (m. 1987)
- Children: 3

Brian Lewis (born June 25, 1958) is an American public relations executive and former Executive Vice President at Fox News.

== Early life ==
Lewis was born in Brooklyn, New York, the son of Julian Lewis and Dorothy Lewis. He earned a B.S. in Communications from St. John's University (New York City) in 1980 and an M.A. in Organizational Communications from Fairleigh Dickinson University in 1995. Later, he returned to Fairleigh Dickinson University as an adjunct professor after teaching two years at the Fordham Graduate School of Business.

Lewis started his career doing public relations for the New York Arrows indoor soccer club. He later served as an executive at Howard J. Rubinstein Associates, Financial News Network and CNBC.

== Fox News ==
In April 1996, Roger Ailes hired Lewis, who was then working for CNBC, as vice president of media relations for Fox News Channel. Lewis oversaw the public relations strategy for the launch and positioning of the network, which started broadcasting seven months later. Lewis was only the fifth employee hired by Ailes at FNC and later, he was promoted to senior vice president of corporate communications for Fox News in 2000, and then to executive vice president of corporate communications for Fox television stations and Fox News in 2006. He also served as a senior adviser to Roger Ailes and was reportedly a member of his inner circle. Lewis and his department was often cited for their overly aggressive approach to media relations. In 2009, Lewis was given the added title of The Senior Advisor to Roger Ailes to go along with his Executive VP title.

In 2012, Megyn Kelly came to Lewis's office to warn about Ailes' behavior toward women. Lewis felt it was serious enough to try to stage an intervention, but his efforts were rebuffed. Judy Laterza, Ailes' assistant, thought Brian's actions were "disloyal" and encouraged Ailes to fire Lewis. In July 2013 Lewis was terminated for "issues relating to financial irregularities" though subsequent reporting notes the cause as cooperating with Gabe Sherman during the writing of his biography of Roger Ailes, The Loudest Voice in the Room. In August 2013, Brian's Lewis lawyer Judd Burstein issued a threatening statement along the lines of "Ailes and FOX News have more to fear from Brian Lewis." In December 2013, NY Times reported that there was a secret settlement between FOX and Brian Lewis. Since then, several media outlets have reported that Brian Lewis and Fox News reached a settlement: For a "a sizable sum" the former Fox News executive would stay quiet about everything related to the conservative news organization and its operations, including founder Roger Ailes.

In September 2016, at the peak of #MeToo movement it became known that Megyn Kelly publicly stated information about the conflict with Roger Ailes in 2012. She complained to Lewis about Ailes' behavior toward women. According to investigation New York's Gabriel Sherman, Ailes allegedly made harassing comments toward her and inappropriately hugged her in his office (Ailes has denied these claims, as well).

== Personal life ==
Lewis married Susan Lampasona on March 7, 1987. They have two daughters and a son.

== Popular culture ==
In the 2019 Showtime mini-series The Loudest Voice, Lewis was portrayed by Seth MacFarlane.
