= Joe Lindsley =

American journalist

Joseph Lindsley, also writing as JP Lindsley, is an American journalist.

== Early life and education ==
Lindsley is a graduate of the University of Notre Dame. In 2003, while an undergrad, he launched The Irish Rover, an independent, Catholic biweekly student newspaper. During his time at Notre Dame, Lindsley also worked as research assistant to Weekly Standard executive editor Fred Barnes.

== Career ==
In 2009, Lindsley was hired by Fox News CEO Roger Ailes. He was appointed editor-in-chief of two local newspapers owned by Ailes, the Putnam County News & Recorder and the Putnam County Courier, both published in Putnam County, New York where Ailes lived. Lindsley transformed them into publications with an aggressively conservative editorial line.

Lindsley became a close confidant and protégé of Ailes and his wife, but left Ailes's employ in April 2011 after disagreements with Ailes. In 2017, he wrote a novelistic memoir, Fake News, True Story, chronicling his time working for Ailes. He self-published the book after failing to find a publisher.

== In popular culture ==
- In the film The Loudest Voice Emory Cohen plays Lindsley.
