= Vera Starbard =

Alaska Native editor, TV writer, and playwright (born 1982)

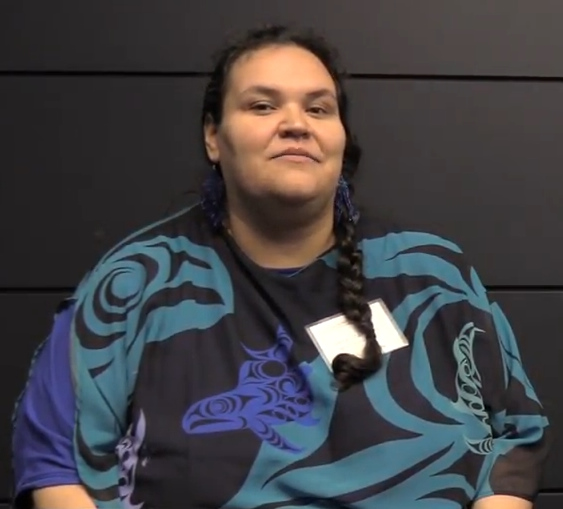
- Starbard in 2018
- Born: 1982 (age 43–44); Craig, Alaska
- Other name: T'set Kwei
- Occupations: Television writer, author, playwright, editor
- Spouse: Joseph "Joe" Bedard
- Family: Irene Bedard (sister-in-law)

Vera Starbard (born 1982) is a Tlingit/Dena'ina television writer, author, playwright, and editor based in Douglas, Alaska, and the Alaska State Writer Laureate for 2024 to 2026.

== Career ==
Starbard began editing and writing as a journalist. She was editor of First Alaskans Magazine, a publication highlighting Alaska Native people, culture and news, for ten years.

In 2016, after premiering her first play, Our Voices Will Be Heard, at Perseverance Theatre, she was named the theatre's playwright-in-residence through the Andrew W. Mellon Foundation playwright residency program.

As a television writer, Starbard has written many episodes of the Molly of Denali animated children's program, airing on PBS KIDS. She was nominated for four Emmy Awards for her work on the show. Vera was on the writing staff of ABC's show Alaska Daily. Vera was appointed Alaska State Writer Laureate in 2024, a two-year appointment.

== Writing ==
=== Plays ===
- Native Pride (and Prejudice)
- Fog Woman
- Our Voices Will Be Heard performed 2016; published 2017; radio adaptation broadcast 2018
- Devilfish (2019)
- A Tlingit Christmas Carol (2020)
- Yan Tutan (2022)
- Kutulagaaw: The Tlingit-Russian Battles (2026)

=== Television ===
Year	Show	Station	Episodes
2019	Molly of Denali	PBS Kids	New Nivagi
2019	Molly of Denali	PBS Kids	Turn on the Northern Lights
2020	Molly of Denali	PBS Kids	Canoe Journey
2020	Molly of Denali	PBS Kids	Eagle Tale
2021	Molly of Denali	PBS Kids	Molly and Elizabeth
2022	Molly of Denali	PBS Kids	Fili-bascan Chefs
2022	Molly of Denali	PBS Kids	Midnight Sun Fun Run
2023	Molly of Denali	PBS Kids	Gold Strikeout
2023	Molly of Denali	PBS Kids	Forget-You-Not
2023	Molly of Denali	PBS Kids	A Song for Lola
2023	Alaska Daily	ABC	Most Reckless Thing I've Ever Done
2023	SuperKitties	Disney Junior	Snow Day
2023	SuperKitties	Disney Junior	Showstopper
2024	Molly of Denali	PBS Kids	A Qyah Juneteenth
2024	Molly of Denali	PBS Kids	Thanks-for-Giving
2024	SuperKitties	Disney Junior	Dastardly Dumpster

=== Other published work ===
- "Our Voices Will Be Heard" full-length play in "Contemporary Plays by Women of Color, 2nd Edition" textbook, 2018
- "Ax X’oos Shaxwatíx: My feet are firmly planted" essay in "Applied Theatre with Youth: Education, Engagement, Activism" textbook, 2021
- "Primitive" essay in "My Life: Growing Up Native in America" anthology, 2024

== Recognition ==
- 2009: Rasmuson Foundation individual artist award
- 2016: Mayor's Artist Award, Juneau
- 2020: Peabody Award (as group for Molly of Denali)
- 2021: Governor's arts and humanities awards, Alaska native artist
- 2021: New York Stage and Film NEXUS grant
- 2022: First Alaskans Institute Young Alaska Native Leader award
- 2022, 2023: Emmy nominations for outstanding writing in a preschool animation program and for best short form program as co-head writer
- 2024: Alaska State Writer Laureate
- 2025: Emmy nomination for outstanding writing for a preschool animated series Thanks-for-giving episode
- Alaska Literary Award

== Personal life ==
Starbard's Lingit name is T'set Kwei, her clan is Leeneidi (dog salmon,) and she's a citizen of the Central Council of Tlingit and Haida Indian Tribes of Alaska. She was born in Craig, Alaska, was raised in numerous communities around the state of Alaska, and graduated from East Anchorage High School in 2000. Starbard met her husband Joseph "Joe" Bedard in 2011 through an introduction from actress Irene Bedard, Joe's sister. They married in Anchorage, Alaska, and live in Douglas, Alaska.
