= Alaska Daily =

American crime drama television series (2022–2023)

- Genre: Crime drama
- Created by: Tom McCarthy
- Inspired by: Lawless: Sexual Violence in Alaska by Kyle Hopkins et al. for the Anchorage Daily News and ProPublica
- Starring: Hilary Swank; Jeff Perry; Grace Dove; Meredith Holzman; Matt Malloy; Pablo Castelblanco; Ami Park; Craig Frank
- Country of origin: United States
- Original language: English
- No. of seasons: 1
- No. of episodes: 11

Production
- Executive producers: Kyle Hopkins; Tom McCarthy; Bert Salke; Hilary Swank; Melissa Wells; Ryan Binkley; Peter Elkoff
- Producer: David A. Rosemont
- Production locations: New Westminster, British Columbia, Canada, Northwest Territories, Anchorage, Alaska
- Running time: 47 minutes
- Production companies: Slow Pony Productions; Co-lab21; 20th Television

Original release
- Network: ABC
- Release: October 6, 2022 – March 30, 2023

Alaska Daily is an American crime drama television series created by Tom McCarthy for ABC, starring Hilary Swank as a journalist seeking a fresh start in Anchorage, Alaska. It premiered on October 6, 2022 and ended on March 30, 2023. In May 2023, the series was officially announced canceled. The series was completely removed from Hulu's streaming selection menu on July 1, 2023.

== Synopsis ==
Eileen is a New York journalist who moves to Alaska for a clean start and who looks for redemption both personally and professionally after joining a daily metro newspaper in Anchorage. In Anchorage, she works with Roz Friendly, to complete and release reports on the missing and murdered Indigenous women crisis in Alaska.

== Cast ==
=== Main ===
- Hilary Swank as Eileen Fitzgerald, a former high-profile investigative reporter in New York City, she comes to Alaska after burning bridges in her previous job.
- Jeff Perry as Stanley Kornik, Eileen's former boss and managing editor of the Daily Alaskan.
- Grace Dove as Roz Friendly, an Alaskan native and star reporter for the Daily Alaskan whom Stanley assigns to write with Eileen on the investigation of a murdered indigenous woman.
- Meredith Holzman as Claire Muncy, veteran Daily Alaskan reporter.
- Matt Malloy as Bob Young, Daily Alaskan senior reporter and acting news editor.
- Pablo Castelblanco as Gabriel Tovar, a chatty Daily Alaskan employee.
- Ami Park as Yuna Park, a Daily Alaskan cub reporter.
- Craig Frank as Austin Teague, a Daily Alaskan reporter.

=== Recurring ===
- Irene Bedard as Sylvie Nanmac
- Shane McRae as Aaron Pritchard, publisher of the Daily Alaskan
- Phillip Lewitski as Miles, a Daily Alaskan photographer
- Joe Tippett as Jamie
- Theo Stockman as Ezra Fisher
- Kourtney Bell as Karla
- Bill Dawes as Concerned Citizen

=== Guest ===
- James McDaniel as Defense Secretary Raymond Green

== Episodes ==
No.	Title	Directed by	Written by	Original release date	Prod. code	U.S. viewers (millions)
1	"Pilot"	Tom McCarthy	Tom McCarthy	October 6, 2022	1HMH01	3.59
2	"A Place We Came Together"	Tom McCarthy	Tom McCarthy & Gabriel Sherman	October 13, 2022	1HMH02	3.04
3	"It's Not Personal"	Clark Johnson	Teleplay by : Stuart Zicherman & Miranda Rose Hall; Story by : Stuart Zicherman	October 20, 2022	1HMH03	2.94
4	"The Weekend"	Danis Goulet	Liz Tuccillo	October 27, 2022	1HMH04	2.89
5	"I Have No Idea What You're Talking About, Eileen"	Patricia Riggen	Chitra Sampath	November 3, 2022	1HMH05	2.63
6	"You Can't Put a Price on a Life"	Oliver Bokelberg	Sandra Chwialkowska	November 17, 2022	1HMH06	2.50
7	"Enemy of the People"	Craig MacNeill	Teleplay by : Jay Beattie; Story by : Peter Elkoff & Jay Beattie	March 2, 2023	1HMH07	2.76
8	"Tell a Reporter Not to Do Something and Suddenly It's a Party"	Ruba Nadda	Gabriel Sherman	March 9, 2023	1HMH08	2.50
9	"Rush to Judgement"	Michael Pressman	Miranda Rose Hall & Michael J. Rezendes	March 16, 2023	1HMH09	2.91
10	"Truth is a Slow Bullet"	Catriona McKenzie	Andrew MacLean	March 23, 2023	1HMH10	2.79
11	"Most Reckless Thing I've Ever Done"	Bosede Williams	Vera Starbard	March 30, 2023	1HMH11	2.75

== Production ==
The pilot was written and directed by Tom McCarthy. The showrunner for the series was Peter Elkoff. Tom McCarthy's Slow Pony Productions, 20th Television, and Hilary Swank acted as producers. Filming for the series began on August 8, 2022, and concluded on January 5, 2023, in New Westminster, British Columbia.

The series' credits indicate the program was inspired by the 2019 Anchorage Daily News and ProPublica article series Lawless: Sexual Violence in Alaska, as well as subsequent related reporting by the project's lead reporter Kyle Hopkins. The Daily News agreed to work with the show's producers, resulting in Hopkins as well as ADN president Ryan Binkley being credited as executive producers on the TV series; however, Alaska Daily is not a dramatization of the specific events documented in the Lawless project.

On May 12, 2023, ABC canceled the series after one season.

== Broadcast ==
Alaska Daily premiered on October 6, 2022 on ABC. The final five episodes of season 1 aired from March 2, 2023 to March 30, 2023. The series was removed from Hulu on July 1, 2023.

Alaska Daily premiered on Disney+ (Star hub) in Hong Kong on November 9, 2022. It also premiered on Disney+ in Australia and New Zealand as part of the Star content hub on January 4, 2023 and weekly from February 8, 2023 in the UK and Ireland and Spain.

== Reception ==
=== Critical response ===
The review aggregator website Rotten Tomatoes reported a 74% approval rating with an average rating of 6.6/10, based on 19 critic reviews. The website's critics consensus reads, "Alaska Daily awkwardly straddles the sensibilities of network TV and edgier streaming fare, but the core message about the importance of local journalism is fit to print." Metacritic, which uses a weighted average, assigned a score of 67 out of 100 based on 15 critics, indicating "generally favorable reviews".

=== Ratings ===
Viewership and ratings per episode of Alaska Daily
No.	Title	Air date	Rating (18–49)	Viewers (millions)	DVR (18–49)	DVR viewers (millions)	Total (18–49)	Total viewers (millions)
1	"Pilot"	October 6, 2022	0.3	3.59	0.2	2.68	0.5	6.27
2	"A Place We Came Together"	October 13, 2022	0.3	3.04	0.2	2.44	0.4	5.48
3	"It's Not Personal"	October 20, 2022	0.2	2.94	0.2	2.40	0.4	5.34
4	"The Weekend"	October 27, 2022	0.3	2.89	0.2	2.37	0.4	5.25
5	"I Have No Idea What You're Talking About, Eileen"	November 3, 2022	0.2	2.63	0.2	2.62	0.4	5.25
6	"You Can't Put a Price on a Life"	November 17, 2022	0.2	2.50	0.2	2.72	0.4	5.22
7	"Enemy of the People"	March 2, 2023	0.2	2.76	—N/a	—N/a	—N/a	—N/a
8	"Tell a Reporter Not to Do Something and Suddenly It's a Party"	March 9, 2023	0.2	2.50	—N/a	—N/a	—N/a	—N/a
9	"Rush to Judgement"	March 16, 2023	0.2	2.91	—N/a	—N/a	—N/a	—N/a
10	"Truth is a Slow Bullet"	March 23, 2023	0.2	2.79	—N/a	—N/a	—N/a	—N/a
11	"Most Reckless Thing I've Ever Done (FKA News Is What People Don't Want You to Know)"	March 30, 2023	0.2	2.75	—N/a	—N/a	—N/a	—N/a

=== Accolades ===
Award	Date of ceremony	Category	Recipient(s)	Result	Ref.
Golden Globe Awards	January 10, 2023	Best Actress in a Television Series – Drama	Hilary Swank	Nominated	
