= The Loudest Voice =

2019 American drama miniseries

- Genre: Drama
- Based on: The Loudest Voice in the Room and the New York magazine articles by Gabriel Sherman
- Developed by: Tom McCarthy; Alex Metcalf
- Starring: Russell Crowe; Seth MacFarlane; Sienna Miller; Simon McBurney; Annabelle Wallis; Aleksa Palladino; Naomi Watts
- Composer: Marcelo Zarvos
- Country of origin: United States
- Original language: English
- No. of episodes: 7

Production
- Executive producers: Tom McCarthy; Jason Blum; Alex Metcalf; Liza Chasin; Kari Skogland; Jeremy Gold; Marci Wiseman; Padraic McKinley; Russell Crowe
- Producers: Tamara Isaac; Agatha Barnes
- Cinematography: Eigil Bryld; William Rexer
- Production companies: 3dot Productions; Slow Pony; Blumhouse Television

Original release
- Network: Showtime
- Release: June 30 – August 11, 2019

The Loudest Voice is a 2019 American drama television miniseries depicting Roger Ailes as he creates and guides the rise of Fox News. It was developed by Tom McCarthy and Alex Metcalf, and based on the 2014 book The Loudest Voice in the Room and the New York magazine articles by Gabriel Sherman. It premiered June 30, 2019, on Showtime.

== Premise ==
The Loudest Voice tells the story of Roger Ailes, who turned Fox News into one of the most powerful, influential media networks in history. It depicts Ailes becoming one of the most prominent figures in modern American conservatism, with flashbacks to the 9/11 attacks, the 2008 U.S. presidential election and 2016 U.S. presidential election, as well as the numerous sexual harassment accusations and settlements that ended his career.

== Cast and characters ==
=== Main ===
- Russell Crowe as Roger Ailes
- Seth MacFarlane as Brian Lewis
- Sienna Miller as Beth Tilson Ailes
- Simon McBurney as Rupert Murdoch
- Annabelle Wallis as Laurie Luhn
- Aleksa Palladino as Judy Laterza
- Naomi Watts as Gretchen Carlson

=== Recurring ===
- Josh Stamberg as Bill Shine
- Mackenzie Astin as John Moody
- Barry Watson as Lachlan Murdoch
- Guy Boyd as Chet Collier
- Josh Charles as Casey Close
- Emory Cohen as Joe Lindsley
- Patch Darragh as Sean Hannity
- Lucy Owen as Suzanne Scott
- David Whalen as Steve Doocy
- Josh McDermitt as Glenn Beck
- Josh Helman as James Murdoch
- Jenna Leigh Green as Irena Briganti

=== Guest stars ===
- John Finn as Jack Welch
- Peter Grosz as Alan Colmes
- Fran Kranz as Gabriel Sherman
- Jessica Hecht as Nancy Erika Smith
- Timothy Busfield as Neil Mullin
- David Cromer as David Axelrod
- Julee Cerda as Wendi Deng
- Joseph Cortese as Roger Stone
- John Rue as Dick Cheney
- Eric Michael Gillett as Paul Manafort

== Episodes ==
No.	Title	Directed by	Written by	Original release date	U.S. viewers (millions)
1	"1995"	Kari Skogland	Tom McCarthy & Gabriel Sherman	June 30, 2019	0.299
In late 1995, Roger Ailes is forced to resign from his position at CNBC. Manipulating a loophole in his non-compete clause, Roger immediately teams with Rupert Murdoch to create a new 24-hour news network named Fox News. Sensing an opportunity to create something in his own image, Roger successfully argues that Fox should cater exclusively to the conservative audience. Development of Fox is difficult, a problem not helped by an accelerated schedule from twelve months to just six. Nevertheless, Roger covers much ground and establishes what he sees as core hallmarks of Fox: an emphasis on bombastic journalists over hard facts, massaging reality to create superiority of conservative ideals and a tendency towards sexually attractive female journalists. Roger alienates several employees but compensates by recruiting old allies and building a new force of people loyal to him. Despite much chaos, Fox successfully launches in October 1996 and Roger begins openly proclaiming to his team that the goal is for the conservative movement to become "the loudest voice".
2	"2001"	Kari Skogland	Alex Metcalf	July 7, 2019	0.356
On September 11, Roger and the team are shocked and horrified by the unprecedented terrorist attack. Roger begins to push Fox to sensationalize the perceived attack on America, in particular by being the first to run controversial footage of jumpers from the World Trade Center. Karl Rove personally contacts Roger and admits that 9/11 presents an advantage to instigate a war with Iraq. Roger delights in promising to put everything behind the war effort. Mass hysteria and paranoia begin to grip the country and, despite clashes with Lachlan Murdoch, Fox becomes increasingly patriotic and begins proclaiming a war between good and evil. Roger becomes paranoid and starts installing cameras, hiring armed security to protect him and eventually moves his wife and young son out of the city and into Garrison, New York. Fox rises to number one in the ratings, Roger consolidates his relationship with the Bush administration and the Iraq War begins.
3	"2008"	Jeremy Podeswa	Gabriel Sherman & Jennifer Stahl	July 14, 2019	0.343
With the 2008 presidential election looming, Roger becomes obsessed with Barack Obama and views him as an enemy of the people. Fox enjoys its top ratings position and sets its sights on smearing Obama's campaign. On Roger's orders, Brian Lewis begins to eliminate sources at Fox leaking information to Rupert Murdoch and outside sources. Brian openly refers to anyone outside of Fox as the "enemy". Having been engaged in affairs and casual sexual harassment for years, Roger sets his sights on Gretchen Carlson. Rupert announces a new global business venture and ignores Roger at a launch event, causing Roger to start trying to attack Rupert's wife through the media. The Obama administration requests a meeting with Roger, but after a long wait Obama refuses to meet with him, instead using Rupert to relay their disgust with Fox. Roger's long-term affair with Laurie Luhn becomes even more toxic, as he begins to exert further control, forcing her to perform sexual activities for cameras in their hotel room. Laurie attempts to flee her job at Fox to escape Roger, but she discovers that her phones have been tapped and that she is under constant surveillance. Roger buys the local Garrison county paper and gifts it to his wife Beth so that it can be used as a tool for conservative views. The relationship between Rupert and Roger continues to disintegrate due to Roger's paranoia and Obama's election. Roger threatens Rupert and gains complete editorial control over Fox. Roger speaks at an event in Warren, Ohio and promises to help "make America great again".
4	"2009"	Jeremy Podeswa	John Harrington Bland	July 21, 2019	0.354
Laurie tries to end her affair with Roger, but he will only allow her to leave if another woman is selected by Laurie to replace her. Joe Lindsley, a 25-year-old journalist, is selected by Roger to help run the Garrison newspaper due to Joe's strong conservative leanings. Roger lays out his goal to rebuild America from the ground up in the wake of Obama's presidency, using Garrison as a base of operations. Beth and Roger begin grooming Joe and manipulate his work to personally attack their enemies. Fox comes under attack from the Obama administration due to their biased reporting methods. Roger mounts his team for full-scale war, utilizing Glenn Beck to accuse Obama of racism and corruption. Laurie starts selecting young women to be presented to Roger for sexual purposes, while privately she begins suffering from a mental breakdown. Gretchen increasingly feels like she is being subjected to sexual harassment both on and off the air. Joe gradually becomes uneasy when he gets first hand experience of Roger's willingness to manipulate fabricated news to benefit the conservative movement. Roger shrugs this off claiming, "History is written by the winners and we are winning".
5	"2012"	Kari Skogland	Laura Eason & Alex Metcalf	July 28, 2019	0.359
In the lead-up to the 2012 presidential election, Gretchen's professional relationship with Roger rapidly deteriorates. Roger remains frustrated that she has no interest in him sexually and works to stymy her job prospects with outside networks. He eventually offers her a show of her own, but gives her an afternoon graveyard slot. Gabriel Sherman, a journalist writing a book about Fox, begins to shadow the organization, although he is met with hostility. Joe is troubled when his entire newspaper staff quits and is further disturbed when Beth calmly shows him the Ailes family's fallout shelter. Roger explodes at Joe's sister at a dinner when she expresses support for Obama, claiming that re-election for Obama will lead to a Nazi police state. Joe later leaves Roger's employment on election night, causing significant distress to Roger and leading to Roger comparing himself to God. One year later Roger begins to support his friend Roger Stone in order to find an ideal Republican candidate in Donald Trump. Brian discovers that an unused floor at Fox is operating an elaborate smear campaign against Gabriel's book. After Brian confronts Roger, he has his loyalty questioned and is later fired. Roger blackmails Brian into signing a non-disclosure agreement. Her mental health completely collapsing, Laurie is forced to sign an NDA and given a cash settlement. Gabriel's book is published in 2014, although it is largely ignored by Roger and his allies. Gretchen confronts Roger about his abuse, harassment and attempts to gaslight her. Roger in turn accuses her of being disloyal and ungrateful. Gretchen expresses submission, but privately begins recording audio of Roger's sexual harassment.
6	"2015"	Stephen Frears	Laura Eason	August 4, 2019	0.419
Roger suffers medical effects from various illnesses, leaving him weaker than he has ever been and causing him great fury at his body's decline (in particular his impotence). Lachlan and James Murdoch assume a higher level of control over News Corporation, leaving Roger out of the loop and forced to answer to them. Despite being ordered not to focus the media on one Republican candidate in the elections, Roger secretly coordinates with Donald Trump. After Trump announces his run, Roger delights in finding the ideal candidate and puts the entire network behind Trump. Later Trump verbally abuses Megyn Kelly, frustrating the Fox team and forcing conflict between Rupert and Roger. Continuing to secretly record his abuse, Gretchen builds a case of long-term sexual harassment against Roger. Meeting with lawyers, Gretchen discovers that the terms of her employment make it impossible to sue Fox, but a legal loophole allows her to personally sue Roger. After Trump gains the Republican presidential nomination, Roger makes plans to not renew Gretchen's contract, abruptly firing her and attempts to cause humiliation. Gretchen accelerates plans to sue. Roger attempts to sexually assault an employee but finds his impotence has rendered him incapable. Trump gains superiority in the election by replicating tactics used by Fox, while Gretchen files her lawsuit against Roger.
7	"2016"	Scott Z. Burns	Gabriel Sherman & Jennifer Stahl	August 11, 2019	0.477
Fox's legal team seeks to minimise Gretchen’s charges. Lachlan Murdoch prioritises the company, not Roger. Gretchen discovers that many women have also been sexually abused. They begin to coordinate. Roger's paranoia grows, believing Gretchen's lawsuit is part of a vast conspiracy against him. Lachlan opens an investigation into Roger, finding that the women who work at Fox have been coerced into silence through NDAs and near-constant surveillance. Roger begins to lose control as some speak openly about their abuse; amongst them is Megan Kelly, who refused Beth’s request to stand by Roger. Gretchen uses her recordings to force Fox into a settlement. Lachlan moves to have Roger fired. Roger attempts to use the power base he has created to protect himself. Rupert and his sons force Roger to resign from the company. Beth suffers a breakdown and cannot even look at Roger. Roger begins to work with Donald Trump, but dies in 2017. Some stay and some go, but Fox retains its position of power in the media landscape.

== Production ==
=== Development ===
On October 19, 2016, it was announced that Blumhouse Television was developing a television miniseries adaptation of the book The Loudest Voice in the Room by Gabriel Sherman. Tom McCarthy was expected to oversee the series and serve as an executive producer and Sherman and Jennifer Stahl were set as writers and co-executive producers. On April 4, 2017, it was announced that Showtime had put the series, titled Secure and Hold: The Last Days of Roger Ailes, into development. It was further announced that McCarthy would also serve as writer for the series alongside John Harrington Bland and that Sherman had been upped to an executive producer. On May 18, 2017, following Ailes's death, it was confirmed that the series was still in development.

On June 25, 2018, it was announced that Showtime had given the production, now untitled, a series order consisting of eight episodes. Additionally, it was announced that McCarthy and Sherman had co-written the first episode together and that Jason Blum, Alex Metcalf, Marci Wiseman, and Jeremy Gold would serve as further executive producers. On August 23, 2018, it was announced that Kari Skogland would direct the first two episodes of the series. On October 5, 2018, it was reported that Russell Crowe and Liza Chasin would serve the production as additional executive producers and that 3dot Productions would serve as a further production company for the series. On October 30, 2018, it was announced that the character of Megyn Kelly had been cut out of the series. The role had yet to be cast and reportedly only appeared in a few scenes. Sherman commented on the removal saying, "Megyn Kelly was a peripheral participant in Ailes's downfall. It was Gretchen Carlson and her lawyer Nancy Erika Smith who drove the events that led to Ailes's ouster...By the time [Kelly] spoke to investigators, Ailes's fate had been sealed. Any dramatization that makes her a central character in Ailes's takedown is pure fiction."

On November 20, 2018, it was reported that Larry Klayman, a lawyer representing former Fox News booker Laurie Luhn, had sent an email to several attorneys who represent Showtime and Blumhouse Television in regards to Luhn's concern that she would be portrayed inaccurately in the series. Based on Sherman's original reporting upon which the series is based, Luhn was reportedly under the impression that she would be portrayed as a "pimp" for Ailes who brought women to him for the purpose of having sex. She alleged that she was actually one of Ailes's victims and that she had sexual acts forced upon her by him and that she was rebuffed by several top executives when she leveled complaints against him. The email went on to express Luhn's desire to act in a consultancy role on the series in order to ensure she is portrayed authentically and explains that if Luhn was not satisfied by her portrayal then there was potential for a future defamation lawsuit. On January 8, 2019, Klayman filed an injunction on Luhn's behalf in the Los Angeles County Superior Court against Showtime, Blumhouse Television, and Sherman seeking damages of $750 million. In the jury-seeking complaint, Klayman wrote that the damages were sought to "punish and impress upon defendants the seriousness of their conduct and to deter similar conduct in the future."

On January 31, 2019, it was announced that the series had been titled The Loudest Voice. On April 11, 2019, it was announced that the series would premiere on June 30, 2019.

=== Casting ===
Alongside the series order announcement, it was confirmed that Russell Crowe would star in the series as Roger Ailes. In October 2018, it was announced that Naomi Watts, Seth MacFarlane, Sienna Miller, Simon McBurney, Annabelle Wallis, and Aleksa Palladino had been cast in starring roles. On November 3, 2018, it was reported that David Whalen had joined the cast of the series. On February 5, 2019, it was announced that Barry Watson would appear in a recurring capacity. In March, Josh Charles joined in a recurring role.

=== Filming ===
Principal photography for the series commenced during the week of November 5, 2018, in New York City, New York.

== Reception ==
The Loudest Voice has been met with mixed reviews from critics, with Crowe's performance being strongly acclaimed. On the review aggregation website Rotten Tomatoes, it holds a 55% approval rating based on 65 reviews. The website's critical consensus reads, "While finely performed and often fascinating, The Loudest Voice's shallow interpretations undermine what could be a powerful indictment of one of media's most infamous figures." Metacritic, which uses a weighted average, assigned the season a score of 61 out of 100 based on 29 reviews, indicating "generally favorable reviews".

=== Accolades ===
Year	Ceremony	Category	Recipient(s)	Result	Ref.
2020	Critics' Choice Television Awards	Best Limited Series	The Loudest Voice	Nominated	
2020	Critics' Choice Television Awards	Best Actor in a Limited Series or Television Movie	Russell Crowe	Nominated	
2020	Golden Globe Awards	Best Limited Series or Television Film	The Loudest Voice	Nominated	
2020	Golden Globe Awards	Best Actor – Limited Series or Television Film	Russell Crowe	Won	
2020	Satellite Awards	Best Actor – Miniseries or TV Film	Russell Crowe	Nominated	
2020	Satellite Awards	Best Supporting Actress – Series, Miniseries or TV Film	Naomi Watts	Nominated	
2020	Screen Actors Guild Awards	Outstanding Performance by a Male Actor in a Miniseries or Television Movie	Russell Crowe	Nominated	
2020	Writers Guild of America Awards	Long Form – Adapted	John Harrington Bland, Laura Eason, Tom McCarthy, Alex Metcalf, Gabriel Sherman & Jennifer Stahl; Based on the book by Gabriel Sherman	Nominated	

== See also ==
- Bombshell (2019) – A feature film based on the sexual harassment scandal of Roger Ailes
