= Molly of Denali =

Children's animated television series

- Genre: Children's television series Animated sitcom
- Created by: Dorothea Gillim; Kathy Waugh
- Directed by: Uwe Rafael Braun; Amanda Strong
- Voices of: Sovereign Bill; Sequoia Janvier; Zane Jasper; Nash Weekusk; Vienna Leacock; Jules Arita Koostachin; Ronnie Dean Harris; Lorne Cardinal; Adeline Potts
- Opening theme: "Molly of Denali" by Phillip Blanchett and Karina Moeller
- Ending theme: "Molly of Denali" (instrumental)
- Composers: Steve D'Angelo; Terry Tompkins; Lorenzo Castelli; Adam Damelin; Rocco Gagliese; David Conlon; Joseph Coupal
- Countries of origin: Canada; United States
- Original language: English
- No. of seasons: 5
- No. of episodes: 106

Production
- Executive producers: Dorothea Gillim; Trevor Bentley
- Producers: Olubunmi Mia Olufemi; Elizabeth Thorsen; Anthony Bostler; Rayna Helgens
- Running time: 23–25 minutes
- Production companies: CBC Kids (Note: Season 1 only.); Atomic Cartoons; GBH Kids (Note: Known as WGBH Kids for earlier season 1 episodes.)

Original release
- Network: PBS Kids
- Release: July 15, 2019 – present

Molly of Denali (stylized in all caps) is an animated children's television series produced by WGBH Kids and animated by Atomic Cartoons, created by Dorothea Gillim and Kathy Waugh for PBS Kids and CBC Kids. It premiered on July 15, 2019, and is the first American nationally-distributed children's show to feature an Alaska Native as the lead character. 38 half-hour episodes were produced for season 1, with a 50-minute special as its season finale. A special live-action segment filmed in Alaska airs between the two 11-minute story segments.

On April 6, 2021, it was announced that the show had been renewed for season 2. The second season premiered on November 1, 2021, and ended on October 10, 2022, after 14 episodes. The third season premiered on November 7, 2022, and ended on July 10, 2023, after 13 episodes. The fourth season premiered on March 25, 2024, and ended on June 15, 2026, after 20 episodes.

The series won a Peabody Award in the Children's/Youth category in 2020. At the Children's and Family Emmy Awards, the series was nominated in the Outstanding Preschool Animated Series and in the Outstanding Writing for a Preschool Animated Program categories. The animated series has received acclaim for its representation of Indigenous Alaskan culture.

At the 3rd Children's and Family Emmy Awards for programming in 2023 and 2024, the series won in the Outstanding Writing for a Preschool Animated Program category for the episode "Not a Mascot".

On May 9, 2025, it was announced that production of the series will end after the 15-episode fifth and final season due to the termination of the Ready-to-Learn grant by President Donald Trump.

== Plot and overview ==
The series follows Molly Shahnyaa Mabray, an Alaska Native girl from the fictional village of Qyah, and her family, friends Tooey Ookami and Trini Mumford, her Malamute Suki, and other residents. Her family runs the Denali Trading Post. The series also teaches children literacy skills by the informational texts and communication.

== Cast ==
- Sovereign Bill as Molly Mabray, the series' titular character. She is of Gwich'in, Koyukon, and Dena'ina Athabascan descent. She has a blog to share with viewers in the lower 49 states about life in Alaska. Her native name is Shahnyaa, which means "one who informs us". She also has a sled dog named Suki.
- Sequoia Janvier (season 1), Zane Jasper (seasons 2–3) and Nash Weekusk (season 4) as Teekkone "Tooey" Ookami, Molly's best friend (besides Trini). He is of Yupik, Koyukon, and Japanese descent. His last name means "wolf" in Japanese. In "Porcupine Slippers," Atsaq refers to Tooey as "Little Wolf."
- Vienna Leacock as Trini Mumford, Molly's African-American best friend who moved from Texas to Qyah.
- Jules Arita Koostachin as Layla Mabray, Molly's mother
- Ronnie Dean Harris as Walter Mabray, Molly's father
- Lorne Cardinal as Grandpa Nat
- Adeline Potts as Auntie Midge
- Ellen Kennedy as Singing Moose, Video Voice, and Connie
- Luc Roderique as Daniel, Announcer, and Cowboy on TV
- Michelle Thrush as Shyahtsoo, Aunt Merna, and Grace
- Shawn Youngchief as William Patak, Maurice, Finnegan King, and Olin Benedict
- Katrina Salisbury (first, second & third series) and Lauren Jackson (The Jokulhlaup Is On Us-present) as Nina
- Rhonda Rees as Barb
- Pamela Jones as Sadie Albert
- Nyla Carpentier as Atsaq, Tooey's mother
- Taran Kootenhayoo as Randall, Molly's cousin
- Pawaken Koostachin-Chakasim (first series), Sigmund Couillard (second and third series) and Michael Podemski-Bedard (fourth series onwards) as Oscar
- Cynthia De Pando as Lucia
- Damon Sky Taylor as Ben
- Hyuma Frankowski as Kenji, Tooey's father
- Tai Grauman as Mrs. Marsh, the teacher
- Anna Dickey as Vera
- Brenden Sunderland as Jake
- Clay St. Thomas as Travis and Mr. Rowley
- Rebecca Shoichet as Dr. Antigone
- Rukiya Bernard as Violetta Lawrence
- Barbara Patrick as Tatiana
- Macie Juiles as Nadia Merlief
- Maxine Miller as Betsy Higginbottom
- Veena Sood as Dr. Amara Batra
- Bethany Brown as Joy Mumford, Trini's mother
- Reneltta Arluk as Dr. Begaye, Willow's Mom, and Mary
- Cathy Weseluck as Charlotte (Sassy Ladies of Saskatoon)
- Laara Sadiq as Abigail (Sassy Ladies of Saskatoon)
- Mary Black as Olivia (Sassy Ladies of Saskatoon)
- Nanieezh Black as Marjie
- Marci T. House as Trini's grandmother

Voice direction by Nicole Oliver

== Episodes ==
Episodes aired in a different order on CBC in Canada and PBS in the United States. Episodes in this section are listed as aired in Canada.

=== Series overview ===
Season	Episodes	Originally released	
Season	Episodes	First released	Last released
1	40	July 15, 2019	June 7, 2021
2	14	November 1, 2021	October 10, 2022
3	11	November 7, 2022	July 10, 2023
4	20	March 25, 2024	June 15, 2026
5	15	2026	TBA

=== Season 1 (2019–21) ===
No. overall	No. in season	Title	Directed by	Written by	Storyboard by	PBS Kids air date	Prod. code
1	1	"Grandpa's Drum"	Uwe Rafael Braun	Raye Lankford	Lazarino Baarde; Sherwin Macario; Alex Basio; Kelli Bort	July 15, 2019	101
1	1	"Have Canoe, Will Paddle"	Uwe Rafael Braun	Tim McKeon	Lazarino Baarde; Sherwin Macario; Alex Basio; Kelli Bort	July 15, 2019	101
Molly finds an old photo of Grandpa as a child and is shocked to see him singing and drumming-Grandpa never sings. When Grandpa tells her he lost his songs when he gave his drum away, Molly goes on a mission to find his drum and return his songs to him. The Qyah Canoers are ready for their first competition. There's just one problem: Molly, Tooey, and Trini don't know how to canoe! Mr. Patak refers them to Connie, but her coaching techniques are rather unusual.
2	2	"Cabbagezilla"	Uwe Rafael Braun	Leah Gotcsik	Lazarino Baarde; Sherwin Macario; Alex Basio; Kelli Bort	July 15, 2019	102
2	2	"Name Game"	Uwe Rafael Braun	Tim McKeon	Lazarino Baarde; Sherwin Macario; Alex Basio; Kelli Bort	July 15, 2019	102
Trini's excited to enter Big Green - her giant cabbage - into the Alaska State Fair, but a suspicious moose keeps nibbling its leaves. Trini and Molly research ways to keep moose out of gardens, and even email cabbage expert Sadie Albert for advice, but this moose is clever. Molly wants to get her Native name when she discovers that her Mom, Dad, Grandpa, and others in the community have one. But she soon learns that only an elder can give you your Native name and getting one will require impressing the unimpressible Aunt Merna.
3	3	"Berry Itchy Day"	Uwe Rafael Braun	Raye Lankford	Lazarino Baarde; Sherwin Macario; Alex Basio; Kelli Bort	July 17, 2019	103
3	3	"Herring Eggs or Bust"	Uwe Rafael Braun	Peter Ferland	Lazarino Baarde; Sherwin Macario; Alex Basio; Kelli Bort	July 17, 2019	103
Tooey has agreed to watch the Trading Post while Molly and her family head to their super-secret-berry-picking-spot, but their trip is cut short by a swarm of pesky mosquitos. If only Molly hadn't accidentally swapped the bug spray for dog perfume! A book in the Trading Post has a recipe for repellent made from wild plants. Molly is thrilled when her cousin Randall calls from Sitka to say he's harvesting herring eggs-her absolute favorite food. Randall invites her to visit, but Mom insists Molly come up with 3 good reasons to make the long trip to Sitka by bush plane.
4	4	"First Fish"	Uwe Rafael Braun	Raye Lankford	Lazarino Baarde; Sherwin Macario; Alex Basio; Kelli Bort	July 17, 2019	104
4	4	"A-maze-ing Snow"	Uwe Rafael Braun	Douglas Wood	Lazarino Baarde; Sherwin Macario; Alex Basio; Kelli Bort	July 17, 2019	104
Molly can't wait to catch her first fish (and to earn her own first fish tale), but when she gets to the river, the only thing she catches is Tooey's missing boot! Molly must put her knowledge of the salmon life cycle to the test and find out where the fish are before the day is through. Molly suggests a community fun-raiser to fix her school roof after a snow storm. A giant maze made of snow! All is well until Trini gets lost in the maze and Molly realizes the maze map is out of date.
5	5	"Bird in Hand"	Uwe Rafael Braun	Peter Ferland	Lazarino Baarde; Sherwin Macario; Alex Basio; Kelli Bort	July 18, 2019	105
5	5	"Bye-Bye Birdie"	Uwe Rafael Braun	Douglas Wood	Lazarino Baarde; Sherwin Macario; Alex Basio; Kelli Bort	July 18, 2019	105
Molly and Tooey think they've discovered a ghost after a strange noise follows them from Spooky Hose all the way to the Trading Post's Bunkhouse. Turns out the phantom is actually a bird stuck in a dryer vent! Molly's bird call book holds the key to finding out what kind of bird it is, but they'll need to learn what some unfamiliar words mean before finding their feathered friend a new home. Molly and Trini tag along with Nina on trip to Kenai National Park to see real, live puffins! As the enthusiastic birders count how many puffins are eating and admire the precocious pufflings, Molly and Trini are alarmed when the baby chicks begin to jump off a cliff!
6	6	"Culture Clash"	Uwe Rafael Braun	Tim McKeon	Lazarino Baarde; Sherwin Macario; Alex Basio; Kelli Bort	July 22, 2019	106
6	6	"Party Moose"	Uwe Rafael Braun	Kathy Waugh	Lazarino Baarde; Sherwin Macario; Alex Basio; Kelli Bort	July 22, 2019	106
Molly retells the story of the summer Trini moved to Qyah from Texas, and how she and Tooey attempted to make Trini feel at home - with cowboy hats, lassos, and "yee-haws." Luckily, Trini has a sense of humor and a poster of Austin, Texas that clears up what it really means to be from Texas. Molly flies north to surprise Nina with a hand-delivered party box of goodies (and herself) for Nina's birthday, but her plans are jeopardized by a moose blocking the runway. Molly rushes to find a solution in an outdoors manual, but the gas in Mom's plane is running low.
7	7	"Hot Springs Eternal"	Uwe Rafael Braun	Leah Gotcsik	Lazarino Baarde; Sherwin Macario; Alex Basio; Kelli Bort	July 24, 2019	107
7	7	"Tooey's Hero"	Uwe Rafael Braun	Peter Ferland	Lazarino Baarde; Sherwin Macario; Alex Basio; Kelli Bort	July 24, 2019	107
It's a cold winter and Molly is set on discovering a hot springs Grandpa Nat once found in a blizzard, so she sets off with Grandpa, Dad, and Tooey on two snowmobiles and with a list of vague directions. When night falls, the success of their backwoods adventure will come down to determination and traditional Alaska Native knowledge of the stars. Tooey's hero, dog musher Eugene Pike, is recreating a historic mail run across interior Alaska. When ice breakup at the river threatens Pike's progress to Qyah, it's up to Tooey and Molly to help him finish the mail run.
8	8	"The Worm Turns"	Uwe Rafael Braun	Raye Lankford	Lazarino Baarde; Sherwin Macario; Alex Basio; Kelli Bort	July 29, 2019	108
8	8	"Little Dog Lost"	Uwe Rafael Braun	Mark Zaslove & Kathy Waugh	Lazarino Baarde; Sherwin Macario; Alex Basio; Kelli Bort	July 29, 2019	108
Molly, Tooey, and Trini are convinced giant ice worms are responsible for a power outage at the Trading Post, thanks to a spooky story from Grandpa Nat. The kids head to the library to learn more about the ice worms and find out if they're real or if they're fake. When Tooey's newest dog Anka wanders off during a training run in the woods, Molly and Tooey find ways to lure her back home. But when Anka fails to return in the morning, they realize solving certain problems can take a village...and a ham radio.
9	9	"Eagle Egg Hunt"	Uwe Rafael Braun	Keith Wagner	Lazarino Baarde; Sherwin Macario; Alex Basio; Kelli Bort	July 30, 2019	109
9	9	"Dream Tube"	Uwe Rafael Braun	Katherine Sandford	Lazarino Baarde; Sherwin Macario; Alex Basio; Kelli Bort	July 30, 2019	109
When a gust of wind spins a wildlife camera away from an eagle's nest on hatching day, Molly and Dad head to the Windsong Wildlife Area on an ATV to fix it. Unfortunately, none of the camera locations on their map are labeled. Molly and friends have their eye on a spectacular water tube for sale at the Trading Post, but they don't have enough money to buy it. Fortunately, there is money to be found on the riverfront in the form of agate stones! Unfortunately, the kids have no idea how to price and sell them. But they better find out soon, because Auntie Midge has her eye on the tubular tube too!
10	10	"Suki's Bone"	Uwe Rafael Braun	Peter Ferland	Lazarino Baarde; Sherwin Macario; Alex Basio; Kelli Bort	July 31, 2019	110
10	10	"Molly's Got a Brand New Flag"	Uwe Rafael Braun	Keith Wagner	Lazarino Baarde; Sherwin Macario; Alex Basio; Kelli Bort	July 31, 2019	110
When Suki digs up an old bone tool covered with markings, Molly, Tooey, and Oscar discover the playful pooch has made an important archeological discovery. Now everything the kids find by the river could be an ancient artifact, including a round, washer-like object Oscar tied to a kite and got stuck in a tree. Inspired by Benny Benson, the real-life Alaska Native boy who designed the state flag of Alaska, Molly announces a contest to design an original flag for the Denali Trading Post. As the submissions stream in, Molly finds her hands full of designs, expectations, and worries. Which flag will she choose? The winner proves to be the most unlikely candidate.
11	11	"Sap Season"	Uwe Rafael Braun	Katherine Sandford	Lazarino Baarde; Sherwin Macario; Alex Basio; Kelli Bort	August 12, 2019	111
11	11	"The Book of Mammoths"	Uwe Rafael Braun	Ann Austen	Lazarino Baarde; Sherwin Macario; Alex Basio; Kelli Bort	August 12, 2019	111
It's been a long winter in Qyah, and everyone is out of birch syrup. Luckily, Auntie Midge is teaching Molly and Tooey how to tap trees so they can make more. But then a mischievous raven unties the rope tethering their boat to the shore, and the trio are left stranded with barrels of sap and no way to get them home. Molly and her Dad are shocked when Travis, a tourist, announces that the goal of his expedition is to find a living woolly mammoth. He's read all about it in a "reputable" book and is convinced mammoths dwell in a secret valley.
12	12	"New Nivagi"	Uwe Rafael Braun	Vera Starbard	Lazarino Baarde; Sherwin Macario; Alex Basio; Kelli Bort	August 19, 2019	112
12	12	"Crane Song"	Uwe Rafael Braun	Princess Daazhraii Johnson	Lazarino Baarde; Sherwin Macario; Alex Basio; Kelli Bort	August 19, 2019	112
When Molly is entrusted with her Grandpa Nat's secret nivagi recipe for the annual Qyah Ice Cream Competition, she's determined to make it a winning dish...until Suki eats the nivagi and slobbers all over the recipe! Molly has just a few hours to recreate the recipe and collect the hard-to-find ingredients. Molly can't wait to help Nina and Dr. Antigone band baby cranes. But every time they get close enough to slip the bands on the colts' legs, something happens that scares the cranes away. Molly puts in an emergency call to Grandpa Nat, who provides her with a foolproof trick to finish the job: a crane dance.
13	13	"Fiddle of Nowhere"	Uwe Rafael Braun	Keith Wagner	Lazarino Baarde; Sherwin Macario; Alex Basio; Kelli Bort	August 26, 2019	113
13	13	"A Splash of Mink"	Uwe Rafael Braun	McPaul Smith	Lazarino Baarde; Sherwin Macario; Alex Basio; Kelli Bort	August 26, 2019	113
Oscar has dreamed about participating in Qyah's annual fiddle festival and becoming a champion fiddler like his idol, Finnegan King. This year, he is finally old enough to play, but he breaks an E-string during the morning of the event - and there are no replacements to be found in town! His only hope is a snowshoe journey out to the cabin of Mr. Patak's mysterious customer, known only as "The Fiddler in the Woods," to borrow one. Molly and Trini can't wait to get their jig on at the Qyah Tribal Hall, but on the way, they run into an adorable, tiny mink that leaves them covered in a big, stinky smell. The duo tries tips from an online "cleaning expert," but nothing the site suggests works.
14	14	"Turn on the Northern Lights!"	Uwe Rafael Braun	Vera Starbard	Lazarino Baarde; Sherwin Macario; Alex Basio; Kelli Bort	October 7, 2019	114
14	14	"Fiddlesticks"	Uwe Rafael Braun	Annie Evans & Kathy Waugh	Lazarino Baarde; Sherwin Macario; Alex Basio; Kelli Bort	October 7, 2019	114
When Trini confesses that she's never seen the Northern Lights, Molly makes it her mission to show them to her. But after several sleepless nights, they still haven't seen the Aurora Borealis. After an awesome jig dance at the Tribal Hall, Molly can't wait for her fiddle lessons with Oscar to start, but she soon discovers she has a knack for playing the drum. A knack that turns into a passion.
15	15	"Mollyball"	Uwe Rafael Braun	Keith Wagner	Lazarino Baarde; Sherwin Macario; Alex Basio; Kelli Bort	October 8, 2019	115
15	15	"Visit Qyah"	Uwe Rafael Braun	Leah Gotcsik & Tim McKeon	Lazarino Baarde; Sherwin Macario; Alex Basio; Kelli Bort	October 8, 2019	115
After wet cement ruins Molly and the gang's plans for a basketball rematch, they head over to the Trading Post where they create a new game called Mollyball! As the game gets more and more complex, the kids must figure out a way of explaining the rules and later, how to end the game. While looking through a travel guide of different Alaskan villages, Molly discovers that Qyah isn't included! Molly convinces the guide's author to visit her village and gets everyone involved to show the writer a good time.
16	16	"The Night Manager"	Uwe Rafael Braun	Peter Ferland	Lazarino Baarde; Sherwin Macario; Alex Basio; Kelli Bort	October 9, 2019	116
16	16	"Not-So-Permafrost"	Uwe Rafael Braun	Douglas Wood	Lazarino Baarde; Sherwin Macario; Alex Basio; Kelli Bort	October 9, 2019	116
When the Sassy Ladies of Saskatoon arrive at the Trading Post a day early, Molly's confident that she and Trini can handle checking them in using a handy guide for guests. But after a series of blunders caused by following the instructions in the guide, Molly realizes she may be in over her head. When Molly and her friends arrive at their old clubhouse, they are surprised to find it half sunk into the ground! Molly is determined to save the structure, but first she must solve the mystery of why it's sinking in the first place.
17	17	"Tooth or Consequences"	Uwe Rafael Braun	Leah Gotcsik	Lazarino Baarde; Sherwin Macario; Alex Basio; Kelli Bort	October 10, 2019	117
17	17	"Qyah Spy"	Uwe Rafael Braun	Mark Zaslove	Lazarino Baarde; Sherwin Macario; Alex Basio; Kelli Bort	October 10, 2019	117
A sensational video turns Molly's excitement about an upcoming dentist visit into panic. Molly and her friends have no desire to find out. It's all fun and secret spy games until Molly and Tooey stumble across a mystery visitor in Qyah. The duo deduces the visitor must be a spy when they examine the stranger's clothing and hear a conversation between an unfamiliar voice and Auntie Midge in a language that sounds like "secret code."
18	18	"Ice Sculpture"	Uwe Rafael Braun	Raye Lankford	Lazarino Baarde; Sherwin Macario; Alex Basio; Kelli Bort	October 11, 2019	118
18	18	"Tale of a Totem"	Uwe Rafael Braun	Dennis Haley & Marcy Brown	Lazarino Baarde; Sherwin Macario; Alex Basio; Kelli Bort	October 11, 2019	118
When Auntie Midge informs Molly that her Mom was once an accomplished ice sculptor, Molly decides to organize an ice-sculpting competition in Qyah. But when rising temperatures threaten to melt the ice, Molly must come up with a clever solution to save the contest. Molly's excitement about attending her first totem pole raising in Sitka quickly turns to panic when she and Randall accidentally lose an important piece of the totem pole-one of the abalone shell eyes on a raven.
19	19	"Reading the Mud"	Uwe Rafael Braun	Glen Berger	Lazarino Baarde; Sherwin Macario; Alex Basio; Kelli Bort	May 26, 2020	119
19	19	"Unsinkable Molly Mabray"	Uwe Rafael Braun	Mark Zaslove	Lazarino Baarde; Sherwin Macario; Alex Basio; Kelli Bort	May 26, 2020	119
When one of Connie's prized turkeys (dugged by Suki) goes missing on Molly and Tooey's watch, it's up to them to track it down. Armed with a tracking guide, Molly and Tooey decipher tracks in the mud to locate the troublesome turkey, named Trouble, and bring it home safely. Inspired by Daniel's tall tales of sailing on the high seas, Molly, Tooey, and Trini decide to build their own sailboat and voyage to distant waters. They soon find that building a sea-worthy boat is a lot more complicated than it seems.
20	20	"Winter Champions"	Uwe Rafael Braun	Tim McKeon	Lazarino Baarde; Sherwin Macario; Alex Basio; Kelli Bort	February 12, 2020	120
20	20	"Hus-Keys"	Uwe Rafael Braun	Peter Ferland	Lazarino Baarde; Sherwin Macario; Alex Basio; Kelli Bort	February 12, 2020	120
In an attempt to entertain themselves through the long winter months, Molly and the gang organize an outhouse race to determine who will become "Winter Champions." Now they just have to figure out how to build an outhouse and keep it from tipping over. After hearing that her Great-Aunt Merna keeps misplacing her keys, Molly decides to create a tutorial video to help Merna train her dog to find them for her. Molly and Tooey cast Suki in the leading role, but when Molly's furry friend's performance is comically bad, she turns to clever editing to make her training video effective.
21	21	"Wild Moose Chase"	Uwe Rafael Braun	Keith Wagner	Lazarino Baarde; Sherwin Macario; Alex Basio; Kelli Bort	July 1, 2020	121
21	21	"Where the Bison Roam"	Uwe Rafael Braun	Ann Austen	Lazarino Baarde; Sherwin Macario; Alex Basio; Kelli Bort	July 1, 2020	121
Molly's class is learning about bartering by practicing with kids who live up north in Kaktovik, Alaska. Molly offers to trade a pair of moose antlers for the kids' fossilized whale bone, but later discovers that the antlers she's promised have been traded around town! Molly and Mom accompany Nina to Shageluk, where Nina is doing a follow-up story on the country's only herd of wild wood bison. Once there, they meet Dr. Locklear and fly out to record the number of bison in the herd.
22	22	"Rocky Rescue"	Uwe Rafael Braun	Kathy Waugh	Lazarino Baarde; Sherwin Macario; Alex Basio; Kelli Bort	May 29, 2020	122
22	22	"Canoe Journey"	Uwe Rafael Braun	Vera Starbard	Lazarino Baarde; Sherwin Macario; Alex Basio; Kelli Bort	May 29, 2020	122
A routine science expedition with Grandpa Nat and Nina becomes a rescue mission when Nina hurts her ankle in a snowboarding accident and must be airlifted home. But dense cloud cover makes it nearly impossible for Mom to find them from the air. Molly and her Mom joins Randall and his family in Sitka for their traditional canoe trip to Celebration in Juneau. When they are unable to find the shortcut to Juneau in time for the festivities, Molly must do some quick thinking about the instructions given by her Elders to get the group back on track.
23	23	"Seal Dance"	Uwe Rafael Braun	Katherine Sandford	Lazarino Baarde; Sherwin Macario; Alex Basio; Clint Morris	February 11, 2020	123
23	23	"Snowboarding Qyah Style"	Uwe Rafael Braun	McPaul Smith	Lazarino Baarde; Sherwin Macario; Alex Basio; Clint Morris	February 11, 2020	123
When an approaching storm forces Molly, Grandpa Nat, and Mom to make an impromptu landing on the Aleutian island of Atka, Molly makes a new friend who teachers her about Unangax dances and together they learn how to perform a traditional Seal Dance. Inspired by Randall's snowboarding video antics, Molly decides to make her own video to show off "Qyah Style" snowboarding. First step: learning how to snowboard! She recruits Tooey to help her, but soon realizes snowboarding is harder than it looks, much less adding signature Qyah Style into the mix.
24	24	"Welcome Home Balto"	Uwe Rafael Braun	Douglas Wood	Lazarino Baarde; Sherwin Macario; Alex Basio; Clint Morris	February 10, 2020	124
24	24	"Snow Jam"	Uwe Rafael Braun	Mark Zaslove	Lazarino Baarde; Sherwin Macario; Alex Basio; Clint Morris	February 10, 2020	124
When Molly finds out there is no statue of the heroic dog Balto in nearby Nenana, she sets out to remedy the situation and ends up on her own dogsledding adventure. Molly's basketball team, the Qyah Northern Lights, are planning to dribble basketballs while snowshoeing to raise money to attend a regional basketball tournament in Akiak. Before the race, Grandpa Nat teaches Molly traditional Koyukon words for different types of snow. The lesson proves to be crucial the day of the run when Molly must rely on her new knowledge to help her team across the finish line.
25	25	"The Whole Mitten Kaboodle"	Uwe Rafael Braun	Leah Gotcsik	Lazarino Baarde; Sherwin Macario; Alex Basio; Clint Morris	December 9, 2020	125
25	25	"Eagle Tale"	Uwe Rafael Braun	Vera Starbard	Lazarino Baarde; Sherwin Macario; Alex Basio; Clint Morris	December 9, 2020	125
After realizing she's lost one of her favorite Suki mittens, Molly must retrace her steps around Qyah in order to track it down. It's Father's Day and Molly has the perfect idea for a gift - a storytelling performance complete with animal masks. Trini, Tooey, and Oscar are ready and willing to perform... or they would be if Molly could get them organized! Luckily, Auntie Midge steps in with some tips and tricks for staving off this Father's Day disaster!
26	26	"Operation Sleepover"	Uwe Rafael Braun	Kathy Waugh	Lazarino Baarde; Sherwin Macario; Alex Basio; Clint Morris	February 13, 2020	126
26	26	"Beneath the Surface"	Uwe Rafael Braun	Lazar Saric	Lazarino Baarde; Sherwin Macario; Alex Basio; Clint Morris	February 13, 2020	126
When a blizzard hits Qyah, Molly has to spend the night at Tooey's house. Sleepover time! And even better, Atsaq agrees to Molly and Tooey's plan to have the sled dogs sleep inside - if they can behave. It's ice fishing season! Nina is studying life under the ice with her new underwater camera, so Molly and Tooey decide to join her in her tent. But a friendly competition to see who can catch the most fish turns south when Molly's fish charm bracelet accidentally falls into an ice hole.
27	27	"Molly's Valentine's Day Disaster"	Uwe Rafael Braun	Mark Zaslove	Lazarino Baarde; Sherwin Macario; Alex Basio; Clint Morris	February 14, 2020	127
27	27	"Porcupine Slippers"	Uwe Rafael Braun	Katherine Sandford	Lazarino Baarde; Sherwin Macario; Alex Basio; Clint Morris	February 14, 2020	127
Molly and Trini want to make beaded sun catchers for their friends for Valentine's Day. After a quick trip to Nenana, they gather all their supplies and are ready to start crafting. But their bag rips on the way back and they lose their beads! Will this be a Valentine's Day Disaster?! It's Mom's birthday and Molly wants to surprise her with a special gift: a pair of traditional beaded slippers. Atsaq and Tooey agree to help, but when they run out of porcupine quills, the trio must head into the woods at night to find and gather the quills from a real porcupine!
28	28	"Picking Cloudberries"	Uwe Rafael Braun	Peter Ferland	Lazarino Baarde; Sherwin Macario; Alex Basio; Clint Morris	May 28, 2020	128
28	28	"Puzzled"	Uwe Rafael Braun	Douglas Wood	Lazarino Baarde; Sherwin Macario; Alex Basio; Clint Morris	May 28, 2020	128
Molly, Trini, and Nina set out to pick cloudberries to make a special pie for Molly's Mom. Grandpa Nat knows a great spot, but the trio's trek runs into trouble when his hard-to-read directions seem to point them every way but the berries. Molly and Tooey find a strange box under the floorboards beneath Tooey's bed and discover it's an old Japanese puzzle box that is storing something valuable inside.
29	29	"King Run"	Uwe Rafael Braun	Elana Lesser & Cliff Ruby	Lazarino Baarde; Sherwin Macario; Alex Basio; Clint Morris	June 30, 2020	129
29	29	"Native Youth Olympics"	Uwe Rafael Braun	'Wáats'Asdíyei (Joe) Yates	Lazarino Baarde; Sherwin Macario; Alex Basio; Clint Morris	June 30, 2020	129
It's salmon season! First order of business at fish camp: help Grandpa Nat fix the broken fish wheel. But when the fish wheel goes missing, Molly and Tooey have a bigger problem to solve. Molly thinks that her Dad used to compete in the Native Youth Olympics. She's determined to put together a team and bring a gold medal to Qyah, if she can master an event.
30	30	"Froggy of Denali"	Uwe Rafael Braun	Peter Ferland	Lazarino Baarde; Sherwin Macario; Alex Basio; Clint Morris	May 25, 2020	130
30	30	"Molly Mabray and the Mystery Stones"	Uwe Rafael Braun	Jeff Goode	Lazarino Baarde; Sherwin Macario; Alex Basio; Clint Morris	May 25, 2020	130
Molly and Tooey find a frog named "Bandifer", and Molly decides to keep it as a pet... until she realizes that frogs are more high maintenance than she thought. Molly and Tooey have been learning about petroglyphs, ancient stone-carvings, and can't wait to see them in real life on their trip to Sitka. But when they arrive at the beach supposedly covered in petroglyphs, all they see is water.
31	31	"Busy Beavers"	Uwe Rafael Braun	Brian Clark	Lazarino Baarde; Sherwin Macario; Alex Basio; Clint Morris; Donna Brockopp	May 27, 2020	131
31	31	"The Night Watchers"	Uwe Rafael Braun	Melissa Berg	Lazarino Baarde; Sherwin Macario; Alex Basio; Clint Morris; Donna Brockopp	May 27, 2020	131
When a family of beavers builds a dam and accidentally diverts water into Trini's garden, the kids must devise a way to redirect the stream before Trini's strawberries are ruined. It's Trini's first camping trip with the Neegoo Tsal or Little Foxes nature troupe, and she's determined to earn her first badge - the Night Watchers' Badge.
32	32	"Spring Carnival"	Uwe Rafael Braun	Elana Lesser & Cliff Ruby	Lazarino Baarde; Sherwin Macario; Alex Basio; Clint Morris	December 7, 2020	132
32	32	"Tooey's Hole-i-Day Sweater"	Uwe Rafael Braun	Frank Henry Kaash Katasse	Lazarino Baarde; Sherwin Macario; Alex Basio; Clint Morris	December 7, 2020	132
Auntie Midge loves to emcee Spring Carnival, but a hurt hip takes her out of commission. With a little help from Mr. Patak, Molly and Tooey build a special way for her to get around in the snow. Tooey's finally outgrown an ugly, hand-me-down Christmas sweater knit by his Grandma Elizabeth. All is well until Luka accidentally takes a bite and leaves a gaping hole in the front.
33	33	"Stand Back Up"	Uwe Rafael Braun	Princess Daazhraii Johnson	Lazarino Baarde; Sherwin Macario; Alex Basio; Clint Morris	June 29, 2020	133
33	33	"Seal Meal"	Uwe Rafael Braun	Anna Hoover	Lazarino Baarde; Sherwin Macario; Alex Basio; Clint Morris	June 29, 2020	133
Inspired by real-life athletes Sharon and Shirley Firth, the first Gwich'in female Olympians, Molly trains hard to participate in a cross-country ski race where Sharon will be speaking. But cross-country skiing is not as easy as it looks, and when Molly faces some big obstacles, she must decide if she'll give up or stand back up. When Molly and her family go fly fishing in Bristol Bay, a hungry seal sneaks into their boat and eats their precious sockeye salmon and their lunch! What can they do to stop the seal from eating their lunch?
34	34	"Puppypalooza: Parts 1 & 2"	Uwe Rafael Braun	Kathy Waugh	Lazarino Baarde; Sherwin Macario; Alex Basio; Clint Morris; Steven Keewatin Sanderson	March 22, 2021	134
Part 1: Tooey is worried one of his sled dogs, Cali, isn't feeling well. When Tooey, Molly, and Trini take her to a vet for a check-up, they receive some surprising news. Part 2: Tooey gets to decide which one of Cali's puppies to keep and train as a lead sled dog.
35	35	"Big Sulky"	Uwe Rafael Braun	Glen Berger & Peter Ferland	Lazarino Baarde; Sherwin Macario; Alex Basio; Clint Morris; Steven Keewatin Sanderson	March 23, 2021	135
35	35	"The Funny Face Competition"	Uwe Rafael Braun	X̱'unei Lance Twitchell	Lazarino Baarde; Sherwin Macario; Alex Basio; Clint Morris; Steven Keewatin Sanderson	March 23, 2021	135
When a windstorm knocks down Big Sulky, Qyah's oldest tree, Molly and Tooey decide to make an exhibit honoring the giant spruce. To prepare, they interview everyone who has a Big Sulky story, and in the process, try to solve the mystery of how the giant tree got its name. After seeing a book of photos that misrepresent Alaska Natives, Molly and Tooey organize a Funny Face Competition to take photos of how their friends and family really are - happy and smiling. Tooey seems like a shoe-in to win... until Aunt Merna comes to town.
36	36	"Going Toe to Toe with a Dinosaur"	Uwe Rafael Braun	Glen Berger & Peter Ferland	Lazarino Baarde; Sherwin Macario; Alex Basio; Clint Morris; Steven Keewatin Sanderson	March 24, 2021	136
36	36	"Sassy Ladies on Ice"	Uwe Rafael Braun	Olubunmi Mia Olufemi	Lazarino Baarde; Sherwin Macario; Alex Basio; Clint Morris; Steven Keewatin Sanderson	March 24, 2021	136
Molly and Vera join scientists as they visit a dinosaur excavation site. After a few false starts, the girls uncover what they think might be the discovery of a lifetime. The Sassy Ladies of Saskatoon are back-this time in search of a glacier they saw 30 years ago. Molly is excited to join them, but after a long plane ride and hike, Molly and the Sassy Ladies are surprised to discover that the glacier has disappeared.
37	37	"Climb Every Mountain"	Uwe Rafael Braun	Cooper Sweeney	Lazarino Baarde; Sherwin Macario; Alex Basio; Clint Morris; Steven Keewatin Sanderson	March 25, 2021	137
37	37	"Happy Trails"	Uwe Rafael Braun	Peter K. Hirsch & Lazar Saric	Lazarino Baarde; Sherwin Macario; Alex Basio; Clint Morris; Steven Keewatin Sanderson	March 25, 2021	137
Molly invites Oscar to go mountain climbing with her and Grandpa Nat, but a fear of heights makes Oscar unsure he can do it. Travis the tourist returns to Qyah to photograph a "rare" willow ptarmigan. Turns out his map is more than a little out of date. With the help of Grandpa Nat, Molly and Tooey help Travis update his map and find the common state bird.
38	38	"By Sled or Snowshoe"	Uwe Rafael Braun	Kathy Waugh	Lazarino Baarde; Sherwin Macario; Alex Basio; Clint Morris; Steven Keewatin Sanderson	December 8, 2020	138
38	38	"The Shortest Birthday"	Uwe Rafael Braun	Jeff Goode	Lazarino Baarde; Sherwin Macario; Alex Basio; Clint Morris; Steven Keewatin Sanderson	December 8, 2020	138
Grandpa Nat and Nina are out in the field observing an active volcano when it erupts! When their camera breaks, Molly persuades Tooey and her mom to deliver a new one - and to see a real-life volcano. But getting there won't be easy. It's winter solstice and Trini's birthday. Molly and Tooey have planned the perfect present-a trip to Qyah's best bird-watching spot. With only a few hours of daylight and after much delay, they reach the special spot at dusk, only to encounter an extra special surprise.
39–40	39–40	"Molly and the Great One"	Uwe Rafael Braun	Elana Lesser & Cliff Ruby	Lazarino Baarde; Sherwin Macario; Alex Basio; Clint Morris; Steven Keewatin Sanderson	June 7, 2021	139/140
Molly learns about Grandpa Nat's dream to climb to the top of Denali in honor of the first person to do so, real-life Alaska Native, Walter Harper. Molly tries to get Grandpa and her father to climb North America's highest mountain.

=== Season 2 (2021–22) ===
No. overall	No. in season	Title	Directed by	Written by	Storyboard by	Original release date	Prod. code
41	1	"Molly & Elizabeth"	Uwe Rafael Braun	Vera Starbard; Story by : Princess Daazhraii Johnson	Krista Baron; Sherwin Macario; Clint Morris; Sam To; Anita Vu	November 1, 2021	201
41	1	"Uqiquq (Throw Party)"	Uwe Rafael Braun	Wáats'Asdíyei (Joe) Yates; Story by : Aassanaaq Kairaiuak	Krista Baron; Sherwin Macario; Clint Morris; Sam To; Anita Vu	November 1, 2021	201
Molly and Tooey are holding a tour, but two tourists are mean to them and make fun of Natives. After Auntie Merna tells them about how she met Elizabeth Peratrovich, they help the tourists learn that what they said was more wrong than right. Tooey has caught his very first animal, and he is having an uqiquq! But, Grandma Elizabeth is coming to visit, and Tooey doesn't know how to give a speech in Yup'ik!
42	2	"Mouse in the Treehouse"	Uwe Rafael Braun	Peter Ferland; Story by : Princess Daazhraii Johnson	Krista Baron; Sherwin Macario; Clint Morris; Sam To; Anita Vu	November 2, 2021	202
42	2	"Leader of the Pack"	Uwe Rafael Braun	Peter K. Hirsch; Story by : Princess Daazhraii Johnson	Krista Baron; Sherwin Macario; Clint Morris; Sam To; Anita Vu	November 2, 2021	202
43	3	"Butterflies and Bunny Babies"	Uwe Rafael Braun	Kathy Waugh; Story by : Princess Daazhraii Johnson	Krista Baron; Sherwin Macario; Clint Morris; Sam To; Anita Vu	November 3, 2021	203
43	3	"Every Meow and Again"	Uwe Rafael Braun	Frank Henry Kaash Katasse; Story by : Princess Daazhraii Johnson	Krista Baron; Sherwin Macario; Clint Morris; Sam To; Anita Vu	November 3, 2021	203
After Molly and Trini find adorable baby hares in their butterfly garden, can they figure out how to protect the babies until their mama comes back? Molly and Tooey find a stray cat in Qyah! As the kids look for the cat's owner, Suki struggles to tolerate this new house guest.
44	4	"Come Back Birdie!"	Uwe Rafael Braun	Peter Ferland; Story by : Princess Daazhraii Johnson	Krista Baron; Sherwin Macario; Clint Morris; Sam To; Anita Vu	November 4, 2021	204
44	4	"Winter is Coming"	Uwe Rafael Braun	June Thiele; Story by : Princess Daazhraii Johnson	Krista Baron; Sherwin Macario; Clint Morris; Sam To; Anita Vu	November 4, 2021	204
45	5	"Trini's Super Coop"	Uwe Rafael Braun	Princess Daazhraii Johnson; Story by : Saima Chase	Krista Baron; Sherwin Macario; Clint Morris; Sam To; Anita Vu	November 5, 2021	205
45	5	"Trini's Winter Warm Up"	Uwe Rafael Braun	Aaluk Edwardson; Story by : Princess Daazhraii Johnson	Krista Baron; Sherwin Macario; Clint Morris; Sam To; Anita Vu	November 5, 2021	205
Trini's mom is coming home on military leave and Trini wants her first meal to be some famous Mumford omelets! But, when the weather gets colder, chickens stop laying eggs. It's Trini's first winter in Alaska, and she's not happy. Texas never got this chilly! When Molly and Tooey overhear Trini and her dad talking about moving back, they look for ways for Trini to warm up to the cold.
46	6	"Basketball Blues"	Uwe Rafael Braun	Cliff Ruby & Elana Lesser; Story by : Kamaka Hepa	Krista Baron; Sherwin Macario; Clint Morris; Sam To; Anita Vu	March 14, 2022	206
47	7	"A Fireweed Feast"	Uwe Rafael Braun	Anna Hoover; Story by : Princess Daazhraii Johnson	Krista Baron; Sherwin Macario; Clint Morris; Sam To; Anita Vu	March 15, 2022	207
47	7	"River Skate"	Uwe Rafael Braun	Kathy Waugh; Story by : Adeline P. Raboff	Krista Baron; Sherwin Macario; Clint Morris; Sam To; Anita Vu	March 15, 2022	207
48	8	"Sea Lion Crooks and Halibut Hooks"	Uwe Rafael Braun	Peter Ferland; Story by : Brenda Leask	Krista Baron; Clint Morris; Sam To; Anita Vu	March 16, 2022	208
48	8	"Nature's Medicine"	Uwe Rafael Braun	X'unei Lance Twitchell; Story by : Rochelle Adams	Krista Baron; Clint Morris; Sam To; Anita Vu	March 16, 2022	208
49	9	"Fili-Bascan Chefs"	Uwe Rafael Braun	Vera Starbard; Story by : E.J Ramos David & Princess Daazhraii Johnson	Krista Baron; Jonna Li; Clint Morris; Sam To; Anita Vu	March 17, 2022	209
49	9	"Ladybug Sleepover"	Uwe Rafael Braun	Peter Ferland; Story by : Dewey KK'Ołeyo Hoffman	Krista Baron; Jonna Li; Clint Morris; Sam To; Anita Vu	March 17, 2022	209
50	10	"Cry Wolf"	Uwe Rafael Braun	Kathy Waugh; Story by : Adeline P. Raboff	Krista Baron; Jonna Li; Clint Morris; Sam To; Anita Vu	July 18, 2022	210
50	10	"A Sound Idea"	Uwe Rafael Braun	Peter Ferland & Glen Berger; Story by : Dewey KK'Ołeyo Hoffman	Krista Baron; Jonna Li; Clint Morris; Sam To; Anita Vu	July 18, 2022	210
Molly and her Dad help Molly's favorite TV wilderness explorers Chris Kratt and Martin Kratt from Wild Kratts find a missing pack of wolves. There's a strange noise in the middle of the night and the people of Qyah wonder what it is. With Nina's special sound recording equipment, Molly and her friends find what is making the noise that is waking everyone up and that is a porcupine.
51	11	"Heat Wave"	Uwe Rafael Braun	Cusi Cram; Story by : Rochelle Adams	Krista Baron; Jonna Li; Clint Morris; Sam To; Anita Vu	July 19, 2022	211
51	11	"It Came from Beyond"	Uwe Rafael Braun	June Thiele; Story by : Dewey KK'Ołeyo Hoffman	Krista Baron; Jonna Li; Clint Morris; Sam To; Anita Vu	July 19, 2022	211
52	12	"Lynx to the Past"	Uwe Rafael Braun	Frank Henry Kaash Katasse; Story by : Aassanaaq Kairaiuak	Krista Baron; Jonna Li; Clint Morris; Sam To; Anita Vu	July 20, 2022	212
52	12	"Molly of the Yukon"	Uwe Rafael Braun	Rochelle Adams; Story by : Yatibaey Evans	Krista Baron; Jonna Li; Clint Morris; Sam To; Anita Vu	July 20, 2022	212
53	13	"Midnight Sun Fun Run"	Uwe Rafael Braun	Vera Starbard; Story by : Princess Daazhraii Johnson	Krista Baron; Jonna Li; Clint Morris; Sam To; Anita Vu	July 21, 2022	213
53	13	"Molly Oodi' Heekha"	Uwe Rafael Braun	Anna Hoover; Story by : Sam Alexander	Krista Baron; Jonna Li; Clint Morris; Sam To; Anita Vu	July 21, 2022	213
54	14	"Bubbling Up"	Uwe Rafael Braun	Frank Henry Kaash Katasse; Story by : Dewey KK'Ołeyo Hoffman	Krista Baron; Roxy Beiklik; Jonna Li; Clint Morris; Sam To; Anita Vu	October 10, 2022	214
54	14	"Eenie Eenie Aye Over"	Uwe Rafael Braun	'Wáats'Asdíyei (Joe) Yates & Peter K. Hirsch; Story by : Rochelle Adams	Krista Baron; Roxy Beiklik; Jonna Li; Clint Morris; Sam To; Anita Vu	October 10, 2022	214

=== Season 3 (2022–23) ===
No. overall	No. in season	Title	Directed by	Written by	Storyboard by	Original release date	Prod. code
55	1	"Homemade Heroes"	Uwe Rafael Braun	McPaul Smith; Story by : Rochelle Adams	Krista Baron; Jonna Li; Clint Morris; Sam To; Anita Vu	November 7, 2022	301
55	1	"Molly and the Snow Hawk"	Uwe Rafael Braun	Keith Wagner; Story by : Rochelle Adams	Krista Baron; Jonna Li; Clint Morris; Sam To; Anita Vu	November 7, 2022	301
56	2	"The Story of the Story Knife"	Uwe Rafael Braun	June Thiele; Story by : Princess Daazhraii Johnson	Krista Baron; Jonna Li; Clint Morris; Sam To; Anita Vu	November 8, 2022	303
56	2	"Raven Saves the Birthday Party"	Uwe Rafael Braun	X'unei Lance Twitchell; Story by : Rochelle Adams	Krista Baron; Jonna Li; Clint Morris; Sam To; Anita Vu	November 8, 2022	303
57	3	"A Whale of a Time"	Uwe Rafael Braun	Cliff Ruby & Elana Lesser; Story by : Yatibaey Evans	Krista Baron; Jonna Li; Clint Morris; Sam To; Anita Vu	November 9, 2022	302
57	3	"That's Snow Fun"	Uwe Rafael Braun	June Thiele; Story by : Dewey KK'Ołeyo Hoffman	Krista Baron; Jonna Li; Clint Morris; Sam To; Anita Vu	November 9, 2022	302
58	4	"Art From the Heart"	Uwe Rafael Braun	Sydney Isaacs; Story by : Princess Daazhraii Johnson	Krista Baron; Jonna Li; Clint Morris; Sam To; Anita Vu	January 16, 2023	304
58	4	"Gold Strike Out"	Uwe Rafael Braun	Vera Starbard; Story by : Dewey KK'Ołeyo Hoffman	Krista Baron; Jonna Li; Clint Morris; Sam To; Anita Vu	January 16, 2023	304
59	5	"Mystery in the Night Sky"	Uwe Rafael Braun	Cliff Ruby & Elana Lesser; Story by : Yatibaey Evans	Krista Baron; Jonna Li; Clint Morris; Sam To; Anita Vu	January 17, 2023	305
59	5	"Lights, Camera, Patak!"	Uwe Rafael Braun	Keith Wagner; Story by : Yatibaey Evans	Krista Baron; Jonna Li; Clint Morris; Sam To; Anita Vu	January 17, 2023	305
60	6	"Forget-You-Not"	Uwe Rafael Braun	Vera Starbard; Story by : Yatibaey Evans	Krista Baron; Jonna Li; Clint Morris; Sam To; Anita Vu	January 18, 2023	307
60	6	"Fire, Food, and Family"	Uwe Rafael Braun	Peter Ferland & Glen Berger; Story by : Yatibaey Evans	Krista Baron; Jonna Li; Clint Morris; Sam To; Anita Vu	January 18, 2023	307
61	7	"The Qyah Ice Classic"	Uwe Rafael Braun	Peter K. Hirsch; Story by : Princess Daazhraii Johnson	Krista Baron; Jonna Li; Clint Morris; Sam To; Anita Vu	March 20, 2023	306
61	7	"The Qyah Ice Cleanup"	Uwe Rafael Braun	Peter Ferland; Story by : Princess Daazhraii Johnson	Krista Baron; Jonna Li; Clint Morris; Sam To; Anita Vu	March 20, 2023	306
62	8	"Puppy Sitting"	Uwe Rafael Braun	McPaul Smith; Story by : Dewey KK'Ołeyo Hoffman	Krista Baron; Jonna Li; Clint Morris; Sam To; Anita Vu	March 21, 2023	308
62	8	"Big Dreams and Blue Skies"	Uwe Rafael Braun	Anna Hoover; Story by : Yatibaey Evans	Krista Baron; Jonna Li; Clint Morris; Sam To; Anita Vu	March 21, 2023	308
63	9	"Sticker Shock"	Uwe Rafael Braun	Joey Clift; Story by : Yatibaey Evans	Krista Baron; Jonna Li; Clint Morris; Sam To; Anita Vu	March 22, 2023	310
63	9	"A Song for Lola"	Uwe Rafael Braun	Vera Starbard; Story by : E.J Ramos David	Krista Baron; Jonna Li; Clint Morris; Sam To; Anita Vu	March 22, 2023	310
64–65	10–11	"Wise Raven and Old Crow"	Uwe Rafael Braun	Peter K. Hirsch & Princess Daazhraii Johnson; Story by : Leonard Linklater	Krista Baron; Jonna Li; Clint Morris; Sam To; Anita Vu	July 10, 2023	309

=== Season 4 (2024–26) ===
No. overall	No. in season	Title	Directed by	Written by	Storyboard by	Original release date	Prod. code
66	1	"A Little Batty"	Amanda Strong	Peter Ferland; Story by : Rochelle Adams	Cecilia Park; Laura Horobin	March 25, 2024	401
66	1	"The Clean Up Mix Up"	Amanda Strong	June Thiele; Story by : Yatibaey Evans	Cecilia Park; Laura Horobin	March 25, 2024	401
67	2	"Steam Bath Choondaii"	Amanda Strong	Anna Hoover; Story by : Rochelle Adams	Anita Vu; Sally Pang	March 26, 2024	402
67	2	"In the Dark of Day"	Amanda Strong	Keith Wagner; Story by : Yatibaey Evans	Anita Vu; Sally Pang	March 26, 2024	402
68	3	"Meteorite Out of Sight"	Amanda Strong	Raye Lankford; Story by : Dewey KK'Ołeyo Hoffman	Malcom Ross McArthur; Matt Perry; Cecilia Park	March 27, 2024	403
68	3	"Not a Mascot"	Amanda Strong	X'unei Lance Twitchell; Story by : Dewey KK'Ołeyo Hoffman	Malcom Ross McArthur; Matt Perry; Cecilia Park	March 27, 2024	403
69	4	"A Qyah Juneteenth"	Amanda Strong	Vera Starbard; Story by : Ariel Moon	Sally Pang; Cecilia Park	June 17, 2024	410
69	4	"The Mystery of the Missing Meat"	Amanda Strong	Frank Henry Kaash Katasse; Story by : Rochelle Adams	Sally Pang; Cecilia Park	June 17, 2024	410
70	5	"What's Good for the Goose"	Amanda Strong	Peter Ferland; Story by : Yatibaey Evans	Malcom Ross McArthur; Sally Pang	June 18, 2024	405
70	5	"Whistle Work"	Amanda Strong	June Thiele; Story by : Yatibaey Evans	Malcom Ross McArthur; Sally Pang	June 18, 2024	405
71	6	"A Fin Romance"	Amanda Strong	Raye Lankford; Story by : Rochelle Adams	Cecilia Park; Matt Perry; Ammie Lieu-Dang; Clint Morris	June 19, 2024	406
71	6	"Follow That Hat"	Amanda Strong	Keith Wagner; Story by : Dewey KK'Ołeyo Hoffman	Cecilia Park; Matt Perry; Ammie Lieu-Dang; Clint Morris	June 19, 2024	406
72	7	"Tusk Tusk and More Tusk"	Amanda Strong	Princess Daazhraii Johnson; Story by : Dewey KK'Ołeyo Hoffman	Matt Perry; Laura Horobin; Clint Morris; Anita Vu	June 20, 2024	404
72	7	"The Jokulhlap is On Us"	Amanda Strong	Frank Henry Kassh Katasse; Story by : Rochelle Adams	Matt Perry; Laura Horobin; Clint Morris; Anita Vu	June 20, 2024	404
73	8	"Truth, Trust, and Harvest"	Amanda Strong	Princess Daazhraii Johnson; Story by : Dewey KK'Ołeyo Hoffman & Kitty Hendricks-Miller	Anita Vu; Sally Pang	November 4, 2024	407
73	8	"Thanks-for-Giving"	Amanda Strong	Vera Starbard; Story by : Rochelle Adams & Kitty Hendricks-Miller	Anita Vu; Sally Pang	November 4, 2024	407
74	9	"Caught Off Gourd"	Amanda Strong	Sydney Isaacs; Story by : Yatibaey Evans	Malcom Ross McArthur; Shawn Pedralba	November 5, 2024	408
74	9	"Dogsled Special Delivery"	Amanda Strong	Peter Ferland; Story by : Dewey KK'Ołeyo Hoffman	Malcom Ross McArthur; Shawn Pedralba	November 5, 2024	408
75	10	"Dinjik Dhah"	Amanda Strong	Rochelle Adams & June Thiele; Story by : Princess Daazhraii Johnson	John Keane; Shawn Pedralba	November 6, 2024	415
75	10	"Message in a Bottle"	Amanda Strong	Kathy Waugh; Story by : Yatibaey Evans	John Keane; Shawn Pedralba	November 6, 2024	415
76	11	"Light Up the Night"	Amanda Strong	Anna Hoover; Story by : Yatibaey Evans	Ammie Lieu-Dang; Anita Vu	January 21, 2025	409
76	11	"Tracked and Found"	Amanda Strong	Johntom Knight; Story by : Rochelle Adams	Ammie Lieu-Dang; Anita Vu	January 21, 2025	409
77	12	"The Off-Trail Tale"	Amanda Strong	'Wáats'asdíyei (Joe) Yates; Story by : Lorraine David	Jun Kumagai; Anita Vu	January 22, 2025	412
77	12	"Star Eyes"	Amanda Strong	Kathy Waugh & Yatibaey Evans; Story by : Chris Cannon	Jun Kumagai; Anita Vu	January 22, 2025	412
78	13	"Qyah Counts"	Amanda Strong	Princess Daazhraii Johnson; Story by : Yatibaey Evans	Shawn Pedralba; Anita Vu	January 23, 2025	419
78	13	"You've Gotta Have a Good Mind"	Amanda Strong	Dewey Kk'ołeyo Hoffman & June Thiele; Story by : Lorraine David	Shawn Pedralba; Anita Vu	January 23, 2025	419
79	14	"Mother's Day Mission"	Amanda Strong	Johntom Knight; Story by : Princess Daasharii Johnson	Shawn Pedralba; John Keane; Cecilia Park	May 5, 2025	418
79	14	"Dleit Yeil"	Amanda Strong	Sydney Hulstine; Story by : Sam Alexander	Shawn Pedralba; John Keane; Cecilia Park	May 5, 2025	418
80	15	"Reading the Sky"	Amanda Strong	Anna Hoover; Story by : Rochelle Adams	Cecilia Park; Shawn Pedralba	July 21, 2025	411
80	15	"Salmon in the Smoke"	Amanda Strong	Johntom Knight; Story by : Rochelle Adams	Cecilia Park; Shawn Pedralba	July 21, 2025	411
81	16	"Smoky Solutions"	Amanda Strong	Uwe Rafael Braun; Story by : Yatibaey Evans	John Keane; Cecilia Park; Shawn Pedralba; Anita Vu	July 22, 2025	413
81	16	"Tooey's Egg-Sighting Adventures"	Amanda Strong	June Thiele; Story by : Dewey Kk'ołeyo Hoffman	John Keane; Cecilia Park; Shawn Pedralba; Anita Vu	July 22, 2025	413
82	17	"Special Salmon"	Amanda Strong	Vera Starbard; Story by : Lorraine David	John Keane; Jun Kumagai; Cecilia Park	July 23, 2025	414
82	17	"Love Your Locks"	Amanda Strong	Sydney Hulstine; Story by : Dewey Kk'ołeyo Hoffman	John Keane; Jun Kumagai; Cecilia Park	July 23, 2025	414
83	18	"No T for Me"	Amanda Strong	Vera Starbard; Story by : Emily Leon	Jun Kumagai; Shaw Pedralba; John Keane; Tess Reid	July 24, 2025	417
83	18	"Catch My Drift"	Amanda Strong	June Thiele; Story by : Lorraine David	Jun Kumagai; Shaw Pedralba; John Keane; Tess Reid	July 24, 2025	417
84	19	"Halloween Party Panic"	Amanda Strong	Joey Clift; Story by : Sam Alexander	Cecilia Park; Anita Vu	October 1, 2025	416
84	19	"The Spruce Sleuths"	Amanda Strong	Yatibaey Evans; Story by : Lorraine David	Cecilia Park; Anita Vu	October 1, 2025	416
85–90	20–25	"Molly's Epic Adventure"	Amanda Strong	Episode : "Big Gust to a River Rush"; Written by : Keith Wagner; Story by : TBA	TBA	November 3, 2025	TBA
85–90	20–25	"Molly's Epic Adventure"	Amanda Strong	Episode : "Molly of Idaho/Cinder Cones and Broken Drones"; Written by : TBA; Story by : TBA	TBA	November 3, 2025	TBA
85–90	20–25	"Molly's Epic Adventure"	Amanda Strong	Episode : "Newt in My Boot/Old Man of the Lake"; Written by : TBA; Story by : TBA	TBA	November 3, 2025	TBA
85–90	20–25	"Molly's Epic Adventure"	Amanda Strong	Episode : "Feeling Sheepish/Chasing the Wind"; Written by : TBA; Story by : TBA	TBA	November 3, 2025	TBA
85–90	20–25	"Molly's Epic Adventure"	Amanda Strong	Episode : "There Is Pele"; Written by : TBA; Story by : TBA	TBA	November 3, 2025	TBA
91	26	"Happy Birthday, Qyah!"	Amanda Strong	Kathy Waugh & Sydney Hulstine; Story by : Rochelle Adams	Jun Kumagai; John Keane	June 15, 2026	420

=== Season 5 (2026) ===
No. overall	No. in season	Title	Directed by	Written by	Storyboard by	Original release date	Prod. code

== Production ==
The show's theme song is sung by Phillip Blanchett and Karina Moeller from the band Pamyua, with a fiddle and drum played by Brennan Firth. Portions of the show's dialogue are in the Gwichʼin language.

Molly of Denali is created with the help of at least 88 different indigenous contributors.

== Broadcast ==
Molly of Denali premiered on CBC Kids in Canada on September 2, 2019 and premiered July 15 in the same year on KM TV. A podcast was released shortly after its premiere date, this time as a prequel to the series, with season 2 of the podcast premiering in September 2020. Season 3 of the podcast premiered on March 3, 2021.

== Reception ==
=== Accolades ===
Year	Award	Category	Nominee	Result	Ref(s).
2020	Peabody Awards	Children's and Youth	Molly of Denali	Won	
2020	TCA Awards	Outstanding Achievement in Youth Programming	Molly of Denali	Won	
2021	Kidscreen Awards	Best Inclusivity	Molly of Denali	Won	
2021	Youth Media Alliance	Best Program, Animation, Ages 6–9	Molly of Denali	Won	
2023	TCA Awards	Outstanding Achievement in Family Programming	Molly of Denali	Runner-up	
2025	Children's and Family Emmy Awards	Outstanding Writing for a Preschool Animated Program	X'unei Lance Twitchell and Raye Lankford (for "Not a Mascot")	Won	
