= The Irish Rover (newspaper) =

Student newspaper at University of Notre Dame

- Serving Notre Dame Since A.D. 2003
- Type: Student newspaper
- School: University of Notre Dame
- Founder: Joe Lindsley
- Publisher: Eddie Giuntini
- Editor-in-chief: Lucy Spence
- Founded: December 2003; 22 years ago
- Headquarters: Notre Dame, Indiana
- Website: https://irishrover.net

The Irish Rover is an independent, conservative, Catholic biweekly student newspaper serving the University of Notre Dame community. The paper was launched in 2003 by Joe Lindsley, when he and students believed that The Observer, another student publication, was showing a liberal bias in their coverage of events. The paper provides news coverage of campus life and features regular opinion columns from alumni and faculty.

== History ==
The Irish Rover was launched as a free print newspaper in December 2003. In 2005, editors of The Irish Rover revealed that they received significant funding from the conservative Intercollegiate Studies Institute.

In 2009, The Irish Rover joined with a coalition of other student organizations to oppose the invitation of then-President Barack Obama to deliver Notre Dame's 2009 Commencement address, writing that they pledged "to acts of witness that will be characterized by respect, prayerfulness, outspoken fidelity to the Church and true concern for the good of our University".

In 2013, The Irish Rover was recognized, for the first of two times, as the publication of the year by the Collegiate Network.

On December 4, 2017, the editorial staff of The Irish Rover published an open letter criticizing the decision of University of Notre Dame President Rev. John I. Jenkins, C.S.C. to provide for coverage of contraception, sterilization, and abortion in the university's employee health insurance plans. The university had previously sued the Obama administration to obtain an exemption from the mandate that would require them to do so, leading editorial staff to write, that Jenkins's "reversal has left many dumbfounded — shocked that after a long and costly lawsuit in which Notre Dame asserted that it was against its Catholic values to play any part in providing contraceptives and abortifacients to employees and students, it would abruptly reverse course and willingly participate in such action[s]."

In 2019, The Irish Rover was subjected to an on-campus protest involving a sign placed on campus that contained clippings from articles published by The Irish Rover and fellow student newspaper The Observer with the names of the student journalists and others circled in "blood-red" paint, implicating them for the deaths of people who identify as queer. The sign's creator later published a video during which she beat the sign with a crowbar, drawing allegations of violating Indiana's intimidation law. The incident drew criticism as an attack on free speech and an attempt to incite violence.

In 2021, the Irish Rover was awarded "Publication of the Year" by the Collegiate Network, and in 2023, "Irish Rover" won the William F. Buckley Jr. Award for Campus Reporting, also awarded by the Collegiate Network.

In 2023, Notre Dame professor Tamara Kay filed a civil suit against the Rover for defamation, claiming that the newspaper falsely portrayed her as offering abortion access to students. However, the case was dismissed, and the dismissal later upheld by an Indiana Court of Appeals in 2025 and the Indiana Supreme Court.
