= The Observer (Notre Dame) =

Student newspaper

- Type: Student newspaper
- Format: Berliner
- Editor-in-chief: Gray Nocjar
- Managing editor: Aynslee Dellacca
- Founded: 1966; 60 years ago
- Headquarters: 936 Hesburgh Library, Notre Dame, IN 46556
- Website: ndsmcobserver.com

The Observer is a student newspaper of the University of Notre Dame, Saint Mary's College and Holy Cross College. The Observer is distributed in print across the three campuses and is funded by both advertising revenue and a campus fee paid by students attending Notre Dame, Saint Mary's College, and Holy Cross College.

It is ordinarily published in print on weekdays when the university is in session by a staff of students from Notre Dame, Saint Mary's College and Holy Cross College. Since the outbreak of COVID-19 the newspaper has moved to publishing three days per week. The newspaper was originally located on the third floor of LaFortune Student Center before moving to the basement of South Dining Hall in 1998. In 2025, the paper was relocated again to the ninth floor of Hesburgh Library when South Dining Hall underwent major renovations.

== History ==
The Observer, established in 1966, is the oldest student-run publication at Notre Dame that still operates as a newspaper. According to its website, The Observer is an independent student-run publication and claims to not have any editorial oversight from the University of Notre Dame, Saint Mary's College, nor Holy Cross College. It has won some awards. On 21 August 2020, The Observer received press attention when the newspaper ran a front-page editorial entitled "Don't Make Us Write Obituaries".

== Controversies ==
=== Allegations of editorial bias ===
In 1987, when some students believed that The Observer began to show a conservative bias, a liberal newspaper, Common Sense was published. It continued on until at least 2005. In 2003, when other students believed that the paper had a left-leaning bias, they started The Irish Rover, a twice-monthly publication that features regular columns from alumni and faculty in addition to coverage of campus matters. As of 2005, The Observer and The Irish Rover were distributed on the campus of the University of Notre Dame.

On October 15, 2020, The Observer ran a front page in which a talk by former Speaker of the House Paul Ryan was placed above a story describing an on-campus event involving Angela Davis. After receiving a single comment on "social media criticizing the page layout for placing greater emphasis on the former speaker’s lecture rather than the legendary Black academic’s," editor-in-chief Maria Leontaras and managing editor Mariah Rush responded to the criticism in a column dated on October 16, the following day, stating that "[w]hile Ryan’s former position and political stature warrant a top space in a typical newsroom, The Observer is working toward becoming a more socially aware outlet. This means highlighting stories, such as Davis’, that represent historically marginalized communities in our institutions."

=== "The Legging Problem" ===
On March 25, 2019, The Observer published a letter to the editor by Maryanne White titled "The Leggings Problem". According to the BBC, White described that "while attending a Mass service at the Catholic university with her family, a group of women in front of her wore 'snug-fitting leggings' and 'short-waisted tops'." According to the Arkansas Democrat-Gazette, "[s]tudents held pro-leggings protests at the University of Notre Dame after a self-described 'Catholic mother of four sons' wrote [the] letter in the student newspaper saying that 'leggings are so naked, so form-fitting, so exposing.'"

== Alumni ==
- Pete Bevacqua - Notre Dame Athletic Director
- Patrick Creadon - Documentary filmmaker
- George Dohrmann – 2000 Pulitzer Prize winner for beat reporting
- David Freddoso – Washington Examiner columnist and best-selling author of The Case Against Barack Obama
- Bryan Gruley – Pulitzer Prize Winner
- Nikole Hannah-Jones – Pulitzer Prize winner
- Ted Robinson – Sportscaster best known for Olympics coverage
