= Gabriel Sherman =

American biographer (born 1979)

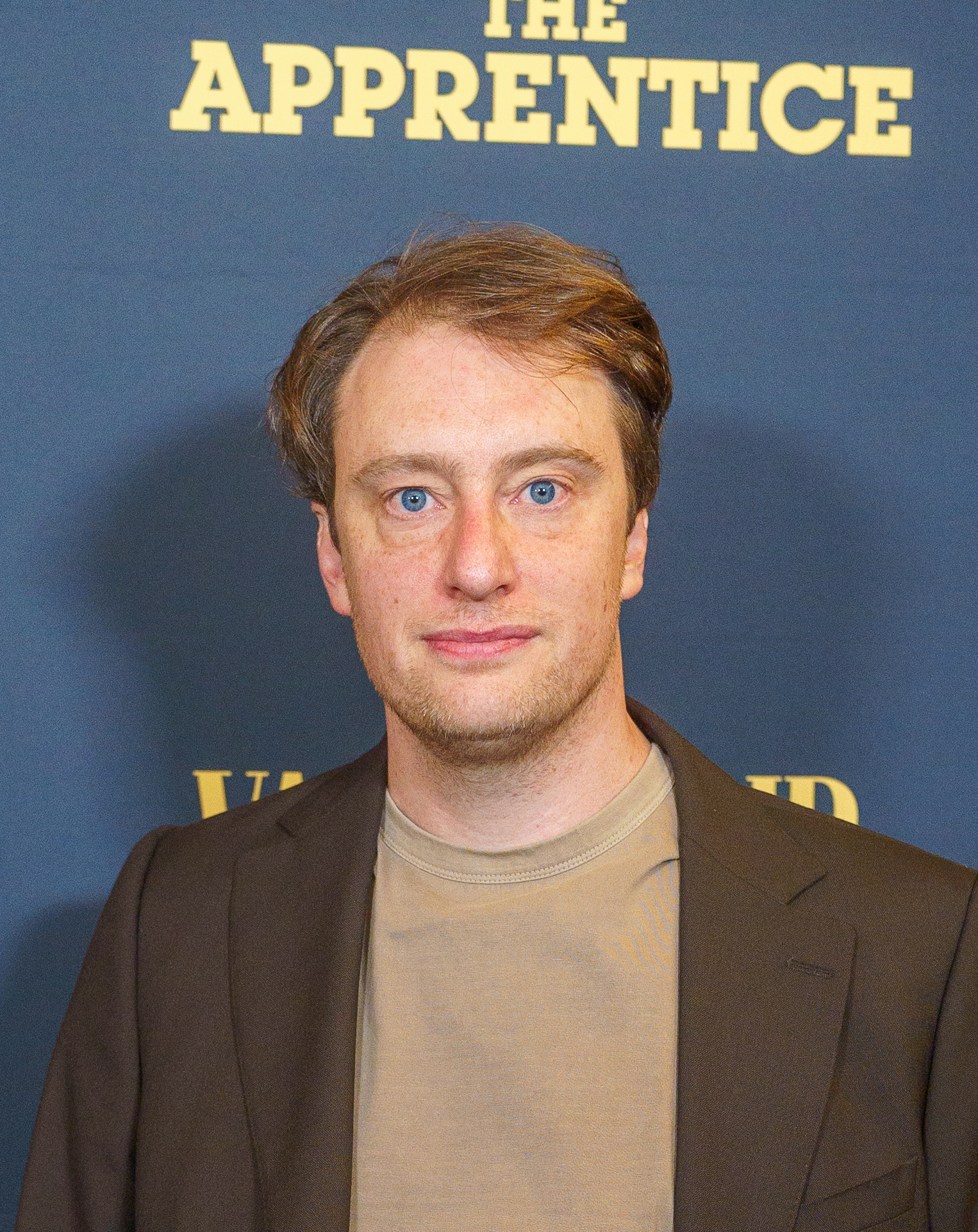
- Sherman in 2024
- Born: June 16, 1979 (age 47); Newton, Massachusetts, U.S.
- Education: Middlebury College
- Occupations: Author, journalist
- Spouse: Jennifer Stahl
- Writing career
- Language: English
- Genres: Biography, journalism, non-fiction

Gabriel Sherman (born 1979) is an American journalist, author, and screenwriter. He is a special correspondent for Vanity Fair, the author of the Roger Ailes biography The Loudest Voice in the Room, and the screenwriter of The Apprentice.

In 2014, he published a biography about Fox News Channel president Roger Ailes called The Loudest Voice in the Room: How the Brilliant, Bombastic Roger Ailes Built Fox News – and Divided a Country, which debuted at #9 on The New York Times Bestseller list.

== Early life and education ==
Gabriel Sherman grew up in Westport, Connecticut, the son of Raechelle Beth Kriger Thedinga and Leonard Sherman. His mother is a dietitian and nutritionist, and his father, a retired partner with Accenture, subsequently became an adjunct professor of marketing at Columbia Business School. He has written for The New York Observer and for New York magazine where he was a contributing editor. He is a graduate of Middlebury College in Middlebury, Vermont.

== Career ==
Sherman is a special correspondent for Vanity Fair. He has been a national-affairs editor for New York magazine, and he is a regular contributor to NBC News and MSNBC.

The Loudest Voice in the Room

SF Gate called his biography of Roger Ailes, the founder and longtime chairman and CEO of Fox News, Fox Television Stations and 20th Television, The Loudest Voice in the Room, "classic in a subgenre that might be called Enraged TV Executives Throwing Things." Sherman interviewed 600 people for the book, but did not have an interview with Ailes himself. Sherman portrays Ailes' leadership of Fox News as "absolute". Ken Kurson wrote that the Ze'ev Chafets' biography, Roger Ailes: Off Camera, released before Sherman's book, "does a better job penetrating the psyche of Mr. Ailes (Mr. Chafets had extensive access to the wizard), and Mr. Sherman’s book does a better job depicting the phenomenon of Fox News and its cultural meaning." Fox News has denied many of the events depicted in the book. The book led to a number of media reports about Fox and its culture. Jay Ambrose said that readers "should also not worry yourself to death about" The Loudest Voice in the Room because Ailes is a "fascinating if endlessly castigated man whose direction of Fox News divided nothing."

His book was turned into a miniseries, The Loudest Voice, starring Russell Crowe as Ailes. In the show, Sherman was played by Fran Kranz.

The Apprentice (2024 film)

In May 2018, it was announced that Sherman would write the screenplay for the film The Apprentice. The film, which had its world premiere at the 77th Cannes Film Festival on May 20, 2024 and was nominated for a Palme d'Or, examines Donald Trump's career as a real estate businessman in New York in the 1970s and 1980s.

== Personal life ==
In 2011, Sherman married Jennifer Stahl in a inter-faith ceremony. Stahl is an editor at ProPublica. Formerly, she was a fact-checker at The New Yorker magazine. She is a graduate of Princeton University and was a Fulbright Scholar in classical and German literature at Freie Universität Berlin in Germany, from 2004 to 2005. As of 2018, Sherman lives in New York City

== Bibliography ==
- The Loudest Voice in the Room : How the Brilliant, Bombastic Roger Ailes Built Fox News—and Divided a Country. New York: Random House. 2014.
- "The mogul and the monster". Vanity Fair. 730: 60–65, 133–134. July–August 2021.
- Bonfire of the Murdochs: How the Epic Fight to Control the Last Great Media Dynasty Broke a Family — and the World. New York: Simon & Schuster. 2026.
