= Roger Ailes =

American TV executive and consultant (1940–2017)

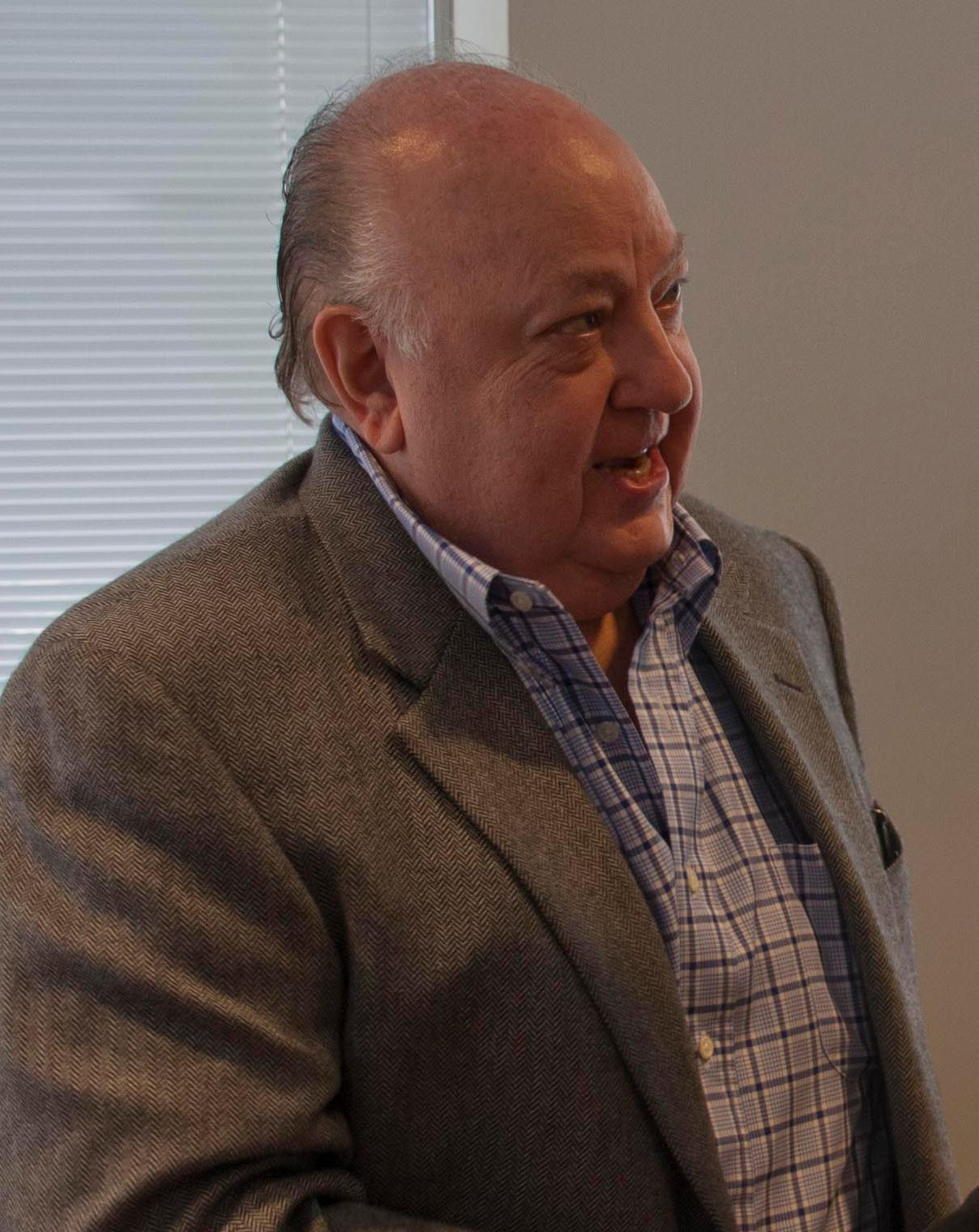
- Ailes in 2013
- Born: Roger Eugene Ailes; May 15, 1940; Warren, Ohio, U.S.
- Died: May 18, 2017 (aged 77); Palm Beach, Florida, U.S.
- Education: Ohio University (BA)
- Occupations: President of Fox News; Chair of Fox Television; Stations; 20th Television
- Political party: Republican
- Spouses: Marjorie White (m. 1960; div. 1977) Norma Ferrer (m. 1981; div. 1995) Elizabeth Tilson (m. 1998)
- Children: 1

Roger Eugene Ailes (May 15, 1940 – May 18, 2017) was an American television executive and media consultant. He was the chairman and CEO of Fox News, Fox Television Stations and 20th Television. Ailes was a media consultant for Republican presidents Richard Nixon, Ronald Reagan, and George H. W. Bush, and for Rudy Giuliani's 1989 New York City mayoral election. In July 2016, he left Fox News after allegations of sexually harassing female Fox employees, including on-air hosts Gretchen Carlson, Megyn Kelly, and Andrea Tantaros.

Ailes had hemophilia, a medical condition in which the body is impaired in its ability to produce blood clots. He died on May 18, 2017, at the age of 77 after a subdural hematoma that was aggravated by his hemophilia. Ailes is known for his influence on conservative media, the conservative movement, and American presidents. He is also controversial, due in part to the numerous allegations of sexual harassment against him throughout his career and for creating what has been described as "a culture of misogyny" at Fox News.

== Early life ==
Ailes was born and grew up in the factory town of Warren, Ohio, to Donna Marie (née Cunningham) and Robert Eugene Ailes, a factory maintenance foreman. Ailes had hemophilia and was often hospitalized as a youth. He attended the Warren city schools, and later was inducted into Warren G. Harding High School's Distinguished Alumni Hall of Fame. Actor and playwright Austin Pendleton was a childhood friend of Ailes.

Ailes's father was an authoritarian parent who was often physically and verbally abusive, while Ailes later recalled that his mother feared his hemophilia and was only physically affectionate "once in a while". His parents divorced in 1960; when he came home from college for Christmas break, they informed him that he would have to stay at a friend's house. In 1962, Ailes graduated from Ohio University in Athens, Ohio, where he majored in radio and television and served as the student station manager for WOUB for two years.

== Career ==
=== Early television ===
Ailes's career in television began in Cleveland and Philadelphia, where he started as production assistant (1961), producer (1965), and executive producer (1967–68) at KYW-TV, for a then-locally produced talk-variety show, The Mike Douglas Show. He continued as executive producer for the show when it was syndicated nationally, and in 1967 and 1968 he won Emmy Awards for it.

In 1967, Ailes had a spirited discussion about television in politics with one of the show's guests, Richard Nixon, who took the view that television was a gimmick. Later, Nixon called on Ailes to serve as his Executive Producer for television. Nixon's successful presidential campaign was Ailes's first venture into the political spotlight. His pioneering work in framing national campaign issues was later chronicled in The Selling of the President 1968 by Joe McGinniss.

Ailes was an employee of Television News Inc., a syndicated television newsfilm service owned by Joseph Coors, from January to September 1975.

=== Political consulting ===
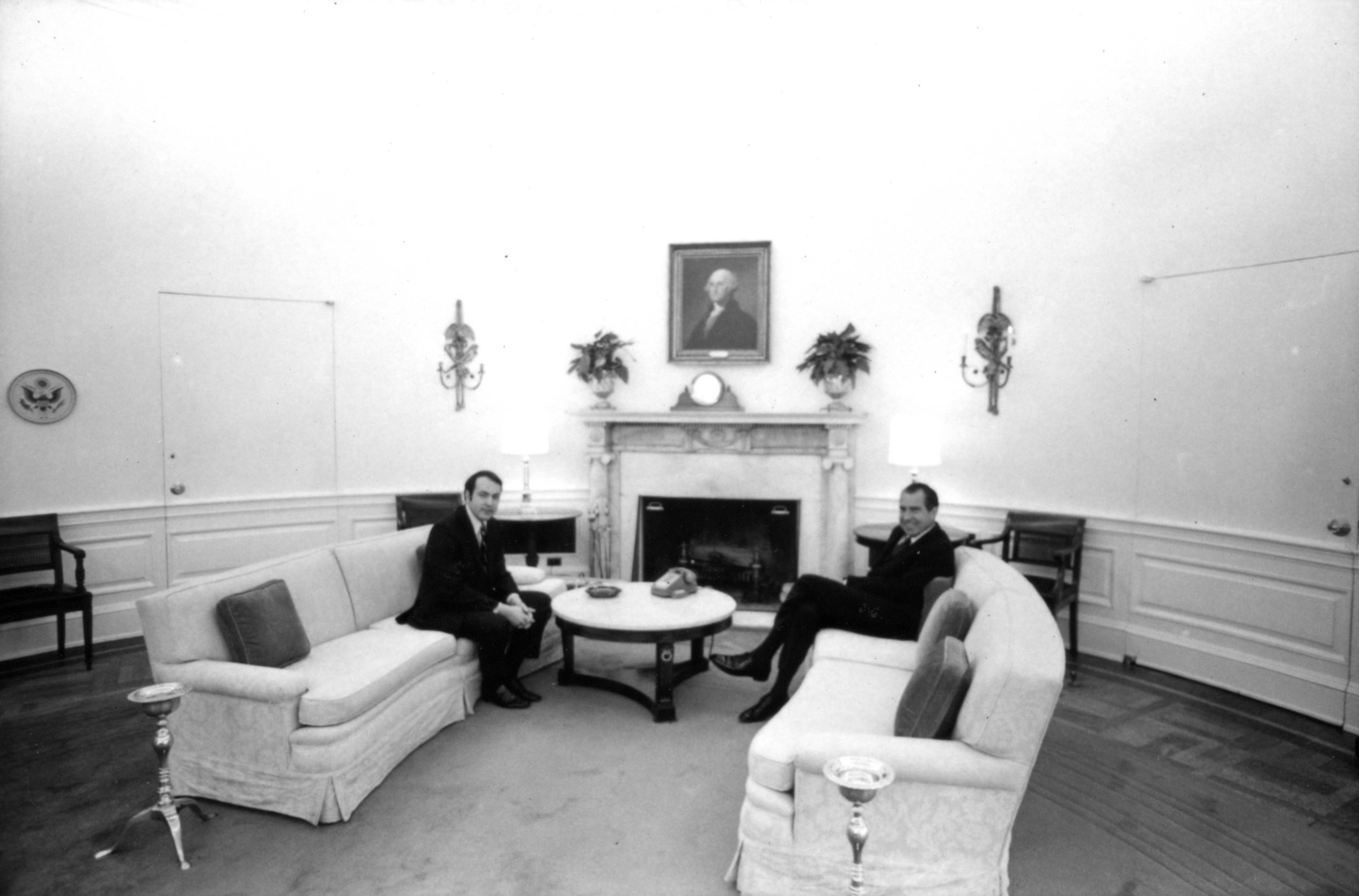
Ailes with President Richard Nixon in 1969

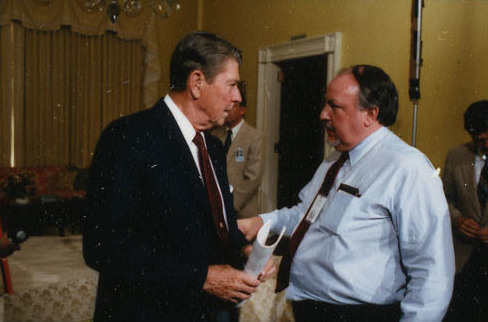
Ailes with President Ronald Reagan in 1986

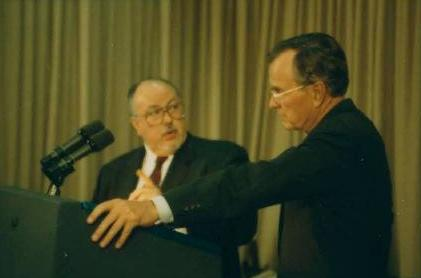
Ailes with President George H. W. Bush in 1990

In 1984, Ailes worked on the campaign to reelect Ronald Reagan. In 1987 and 1988, Ailes was credited (along with fellow consultant Lee Atwater) with guiding George H. W. Bush to victory in the Republican primaries and in the victory over Michael Dukakis.

Ailes was credited with the "Orchestra Pit Theory" regarding sensationalist political coverage in the news media, which originated with his quip:

If you have two guys on a stage and one guy says, "I have a solution to the Middle East problem," and the other guy falls in the orchestra pit, who do you think is going to be on the evening news?

Ailes's last campaign was the unsuccessful effort of Richard Thornburgh in his run for the U.S. Senate in Pennsylvania in November 1991. He announced his withdrawal from political consulting in 1991.

Days after the 9/11 attacks, Ailes advised President George W. Bush that the American public would be patient as long as they were convinced that Bush was using the harshest measures possible. The correspondence was revealed in Bob Woodward's book Bush at War. Criticized for giving political advice, Ailes lashed out against Woodward, saying "Woodward got it all screwed up, as usual", and "The reason he's not as rich as Tom Clancy is that while he and Clancy both make stuff up, Clancy does his research first." Ailes refused to release a copy of the memo he sent to Bush.

=== Book ===
In 1988, Ailes wrote a book with long-time aide Jon Kraushar entitled You Are the Message: Secrets of the Master Communicators. In 1989, Ailes wrote another book with Kraushar entitled You Are the Message: Getting What You Want by Being Who You Are.

=== America's Talking channel ===
Ailes eventually made his way back to television, this time focusing on cable news. In 1993, he became president of CNBC and later created the America's Talking channel, which would eventually become MSNBC. He hosted an interview program on America's Talking. In 1995, NBC hired a law firm to conduct an internal investigation after Ailes allegedly called NBC executive David Zaslav a "little fucking Jew prick." This was not confirmed as the reason for his departure.

=== 20th Television/Fox News ===
Ailes was hired by News Corp chairman Rupert Murdoch in 1996 to become the CEO of Fox News, effective on October 7.

After the departure of Lachlan Murdoch from News Corporation, Ailes was named Chairman of the Fox Television Stations Group on August 15, 2005. Following his newest assignment, one of his first acts was canceling A Current Affair in September 2005 and replacing it with a new Geraldo Rivera show, Geraldo at Large, which debuted on Halloween, 2005. Rivera's show drew about the same ratings as A Current Affair in January 2007.

Ailes hired former Viacom executive Dennis Swanson in October 2005 to be president of the Fox Television Stations Group. Additionally, there were changes in affiliates' news programs with the standardization of Fox News Channel-like graphics, redesigned studios, news-format changes, and the announcement of a new morning television show called The Morning Show with Mike and Juliet to be produced by Fox News Channel.

In January 2011, 400 rabbis, including leaders from various branches of Judaism in the United States, published an open letter in The Wall Street Journal on the UN-designated Holocaust Remembrance Day. They called on Rupert Murdoch to sanction Fox News commentator Glenn Beck for his use of the Holocaust to "discredit any individual or organization you disagree with." An executive at Fox News rejected the letter, calling it the work of a "George Soros-backed left wing political organization." Ailes is also said to have once referred to Jewish critics of his as "left-wing rabbis."

Also in 2011, Ailes was criticized for referring to executives of the public radio network NPR as "Nazis" for firing a news analyst, Juan Williams, after Williams had made remarks considered by NPR to be offensive. Ailes apologized to a Jewish group, but not to NPR, for using the expression, writing to the Anti-Defamation League (ADL): "I was of course ad-libbing and should not have chosen that word, but I was angry at the time because of NPR's willingness to censor Juan Williams for not being liberal enough ... My now considered opinion 'nasty, inflexible bigot' would have worked better." The ADL welcomed and accepted the apology through its National Director, Abraham Foxman; in a subsequent letter to The Wall Street Journal Foxman said that both Ailes and Beck were "pro-Israel stalwarts."

In October 2012, Ailes's contract with Fox News was renewed for four years, through 2016. If completed, he would have served as head of Fox News Channel for 20 years. Salary terms were not made public, although his earnings for the 2012 fiscal year were $21 million (~$29.1 million in 2025) inclusive of bonuses. In addition to heading Fox News and chairing Fox Television Stations, Ailes also chaired 20th Television, MyNetworkTV and Fox Business Network.

==== Sexual harassment allegations ====
In a book published in 2014, Gabriel Sherman alleged that, in the 1980s, Ailes offered a television producer a raise if she would sleep with him. Fox News denied the allegation and rejected the authenticity of Sherman's book.

On July 6, 2016, former Fox News anchor Gretchen Carlson filed a sexual harassment lawsuit against Ailes; Carlson's allegations were the impetus for more than a dozen female employees at 21st Century Fox to step forward regarding their own experiences with Ailes's behavior. Carlson alleged that she had been fired for rebuffing Ailes' advances. Ailes, through his attorney, Susan Estrich, denied the charges. Three days later, Sherman reported accounts from six women (two publicly and four anonymously) who alleged sexual harassment by Ailes. In response, Ailes's counsel released a statement: "It has become obvious that Ms. Carlson and her lawyer are desperately attempting to litigate this in the press because they have no legal case to argue."

Following Ailes' resignation, Andrea Tantaros claimed in August 2016 that she approached Fox News executives about his behavior towards her in 2015. She stated that her allegations resulted first in her being demoted, and then in her being taken off the air in April 2016. Tantaros filed a lawsuit against Fox News in August 2016 for sexual harassment, also accusing Bill O'Reilly and Scott Brown.

On August 8, 2016, Shelley Ross, writing for The Daily Beast, described her encounter of sexual harassment with Ailes in 1981. She claimed that at a lunch meeting Ailes asked her, "When did you first discover you were sexy?" When Ross explained to Ailes that she found the conversation "very embarrassing," he responded that "the best expression of loyalty comes in the form of a sexual alliance." The next month, 21st Century Fox announced it had settled a lawsuit with Carlson over her allegations of harassment against Ailes. 21st Century Fox was also reported to have made separate settlements with at least two other women who made complaints about Ailes.

In November 2016, Fox News anchor Megyn Kelly wrote in her book about the details of her sexual harassment allegations against Ailes. According to Kelly, when she first joined Fox News, Ailes would have meetings with her, during which he would make sexual remarks. Kelly alleges that he also tried to kiss her several times during a closed-door meeting, but she was able to get away and leave the office. After that incident in 2006, Kelly says that Ailes did not sexually harass her again. Then, in 2016, when Carlson first made her sexual harassment allegations, 21st Century Fox pressured Kelly to defend Ailes, which she refused to do.

==== Resignation ====
Ten days later, New York magazine reported that an internal review into Carlson's claims had expanded into a broader review of Ailes's stewardship. It also claimed Rupert Murdoch and his sons, Lachlan and James, had seen enough information in the preliminary review to conclude that Ailes had to go. They disagreed on the timing, however; James wanted Ailes out immediately, while Rupert and Lachlan wanted to wait until after the Republican National Convention. On July 19, New York reported that Megyn Kelly told investigators Ailes made "unwanted sexual advances toward her" at the start of her career. The magazine also reported that the Murdochs had given Ailes an ultimatum—resign by August 1 or be fired.

On July 21, 2016, Ailes resigned from Fox News, receiving about $40 million (~$53.7 million in 2025) from 21st Century Fox (the then-parent company of 20th Century Fox and Fox News) in an exit agreement. Rupert Murdoch succeeded him as chairman, and as interim CEO until the naming of a permanent replacement. In a letter to Murdoch, Ailes wrote: "I will not allow my presence to become a distraction from the work that must be done every day to ensure that Fox News and Fox Business continue to lead our industry." Ailes was thanked for his work, without mention of the allegations. He continued to advise Murdoch and 21st Century Fox through 2017 until his death.

=== After 20th Television and Fox News ===
In 2016, after he left Fox News, he became an adviser to Donald Trump's presidential campaign, where he assisted with debate preparation. He also reportedly was an advisor to Rupert Murdoch but it was clarified that he will not be a “consultant” at Fox News.

== Personal life ==
Ailes was married three times. His first marriage was to Marjorie White from 1960 to 1977.

He married his second wife Norma Ferrer in 1980 after meeting while working together on The Mike Douglas Show. Ailes adopted Norma's daughter Shawn Ferrer upon their wedding, walking Shawn down the aisle at her first wedding to Alexander Visco on April 12, 2001. Norma and Roger were married until 1995.

He married his third wife Elizabeth Tilson (born 1960) on February 14, 1998. Formerly a television executive, she was the owner and publisher of local New York state newspapers The Putnam County News & Recorder and The Putnam County Courier. Roger Ailes had one son, named Zachary, with Tilson. The family resided in Garrison, New York, on a hilltop parcel in a home constructed of Adirondack river stone across the Hudson River from United States Military Academy at West Point. Ailes also had residences in Cresskill, New Jersey, and Palm Beach, Florida. Ailes was a longtime friend of journalist and media personality Barbara Walters.

== Philanthropy ==
=== Ohio University ===
In October 2007, Ailes donated to Ohio University for a renovated student newsroom. Ailes had majored in radio and television while at Ohio University and served two years as manager of the school's radio station. Starting in 1994, he funded scholarships for Ohio University students in the school's telecommunications programs.

=== Putnam County senior center ===
Ailes and his wife Elizabeth, through their charity, ACI Senior Development Corp., promised $500,000 toward the completion of a senior center in Cold Spring, Putnam County, New York. Local opposition to Ailes's participation in the project arose after publication of the sexual harassment accusations against him and in response to a Journal News report about previously undisclosed conditions attached to the proposed gift. Under those conditions, ACI would act as general contractor for the project with no obligation to conduct competitive bidding before awarding construction management and other subcontracts.

Further, ACI was excused from any obligation to pay prevailing wages to workers on the project, workers and subcontractors would have no recourse against ACI in case of payment disputes and ACI would deliver its work without warranty. There was extensive public objection to Ailes's participation. At an August 2, 2016 public hearing, the Putnam County Legislature suspended adoption of the proposed charitable donation agreement with ACI. The next day Ailes withdrew the gift.

== Death ==
In a 2013 book excerpt from Roger Ailes: Off Camera, Ailes spoke about facing death, saying, "Because of my hemophilia, I've been prepared to face death all of my life. When it comes, I'll be fine, calm. I'll miss life, though. Especially my family."

On May 10, 2017, Ailes fell and hit his head at his Palm Beach, Florida, home. He died on May 18, three days after his 77th birthday, due to injuries from the fall. The Palm Beach County Medical Examiner attributed his death to a subdural hematoma, aggravated by hemophilia. His wife, Elizabeth, announced his death in a statement on the Drudge Report.

George H. W. Bush, Rupert Murdoch, Sean Hannity, Bill Hemmer, Bret Baier, Geraldo Rivera, Laura Ingraham, Kimberly Guilfoyle, Jesse Jackson, Ainsley Earhardt, Shannon Bream, Al Sharpton, David Axelrod, Jeanine Pirro, Martha MacCallum, Newt Gingrich, and Lou Dobbs paid tribute to Ailes.

== In popular culture ==
In 2018, Ailes briefly appears in the Adam McKay film Vice.

In 2019, Russell Crowe portrayed Roger Ailes in Showtime's limited series The Loudest Voice alongside Naomi Watts as Gretchen Carlson. Crowe won a Golden Globe for the performance.

The same year, John Lithgow received critical acclaim for playing Ailes in Jay Roach's film Bombshell, also starring Charlize Theron as Megyn Kelly and Nicole Kidman as Gretchen Carlson.

== Biographies ==
- Kerwin Swint (2008). Dark Genius: The Influential Career of Legendary Political Operative and Fox News Founder Roger Ailes. Union Square Press. ISBN 978-1-4027-5445-6.
- David Brock (2012). The Fox Effect: How Roger Ailes Turned a Network into a Propaganda Machine. Anchor. ISBN 978-0-307-27958-3.
- Ze'ev Chafets (2013). Roger Ailes: Off Camera. Sentinel. ISBN 978-1-59523-108-6.
- Gabriel Sherman (2014). The Loudest Voice In The Room: How The Brilliant, Bombastic Roger Ailes Built Fox News – And Divided A Country. Random House. ISBN 978-0-8129-9285-4.

== Documentaries ==
- Divide and Conquer: The Story of Roger Ailes (documentary, 2018, dir. Alexis Bloom)
