= Poet Laureate of Alaska =

The poet laureate of Alaska also known as Alaska state writer laureate is the poet laureate for the U.S. state of Alaska. The first Alaska poet laureate, Margaret Mielke, was appointed in 1963. The program expanded to include other kinds of writers in 1996.

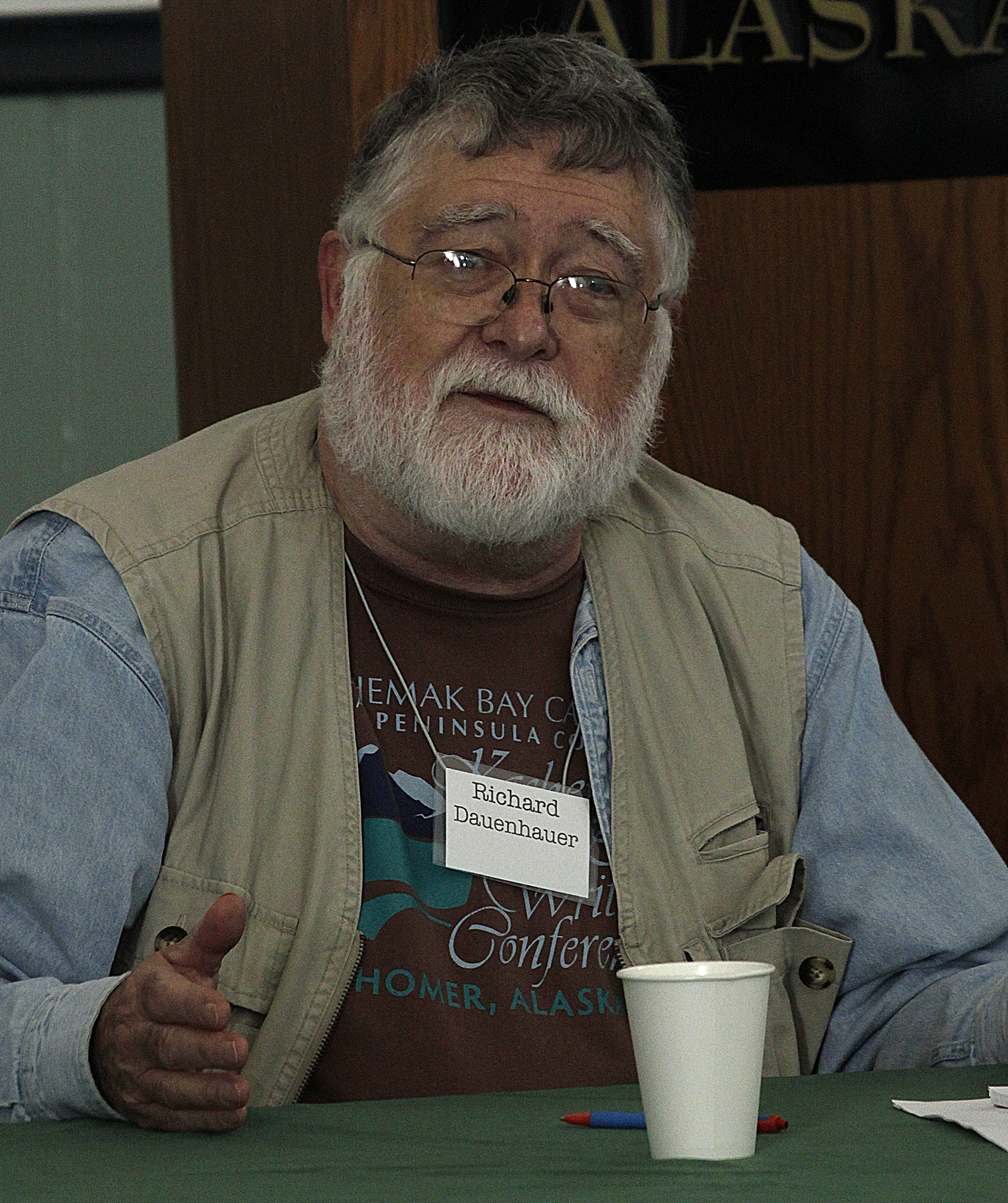
Richard Dauenhauer was poet laureate in 1981.

== List of poets laureate ==
Poets laureate of Alaska include:

- Margaret Mielke (1963-1965)
- Oliver Everette (1965-1967)
- John Haines (1969)
- Ruben Gaines (1973)
- Sheila Nickerson (1977)
- Richard Dauenhauer (1981)
- Joanne Townsend (1988)
- Tom Sexton (1995)

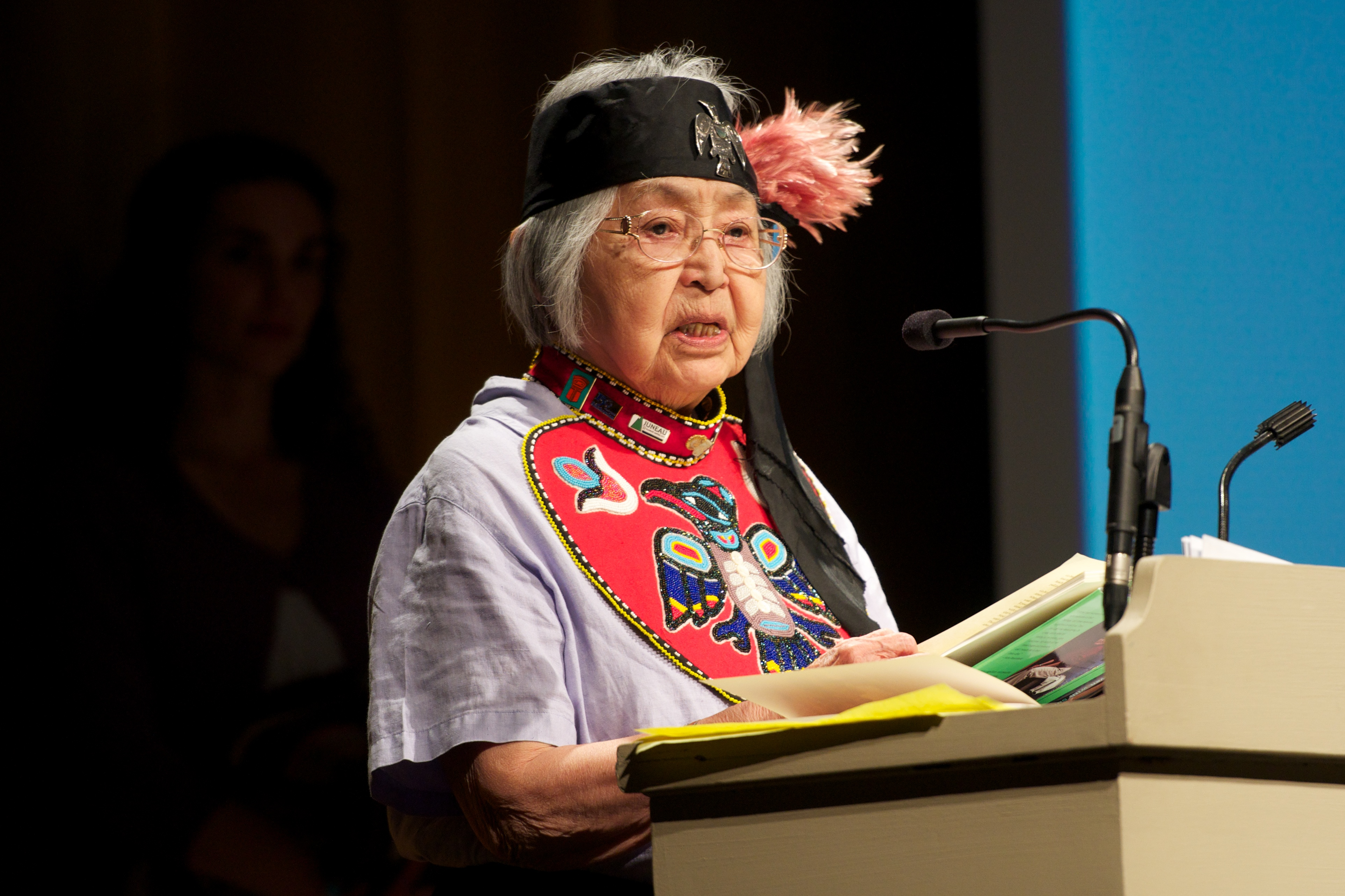
Nora Dauenhauer was state writer laureate in 2012.

== List of state writers laureate ==
- Richard Nelson (2000)
- Anne Hanley (2002-2004)
- Jerah Chadwick (2004-2006)
- John Straley (2006-2008)
- Nancy Lord (2008-2010)
- Peggy Shumaker (2010-2012)
- Nora Marks Dauenhauer (2012-2014)
- Frank Soos (2014-2016)
- Ernestine Hayes (2016-2019)
- Heather Lende (2021– )

== See also ==
- Poet laureate
- List of U.S. state poets laureate
- United States Poet Laureate
