= The Loudest Voice in the Room =

2014 biography of Roger Ailes by Gabriel Sherman

- First edition
- Author: Gabriel Sherman
- Language: English
- Genre: Biography
- Published: 2014
- Publisher: Random House
- Publication place: United States

The Loudest Voice in the Room: How the Brilliant, Bombastic Roger Ailes Built Fox News – and Divided a Country is a 2014 biographical book about Fox News president Roger Ailes written by Gabriel Sherman, which debuted at #9 on The New York Times Bestseller list.

Sherman spent $100,000 from his advance to have two fact-checkers go through the book.

== TV adaptation ==
A television series based on the Sherman book premiered in 2019 on Showtime. It stars Russell Crowe as Roger Ailes and Naomi Watts as Gretchen Carlson.
