= Ze'ev Chafets =

American novelist

Zev Chafets
- זאב חפץ
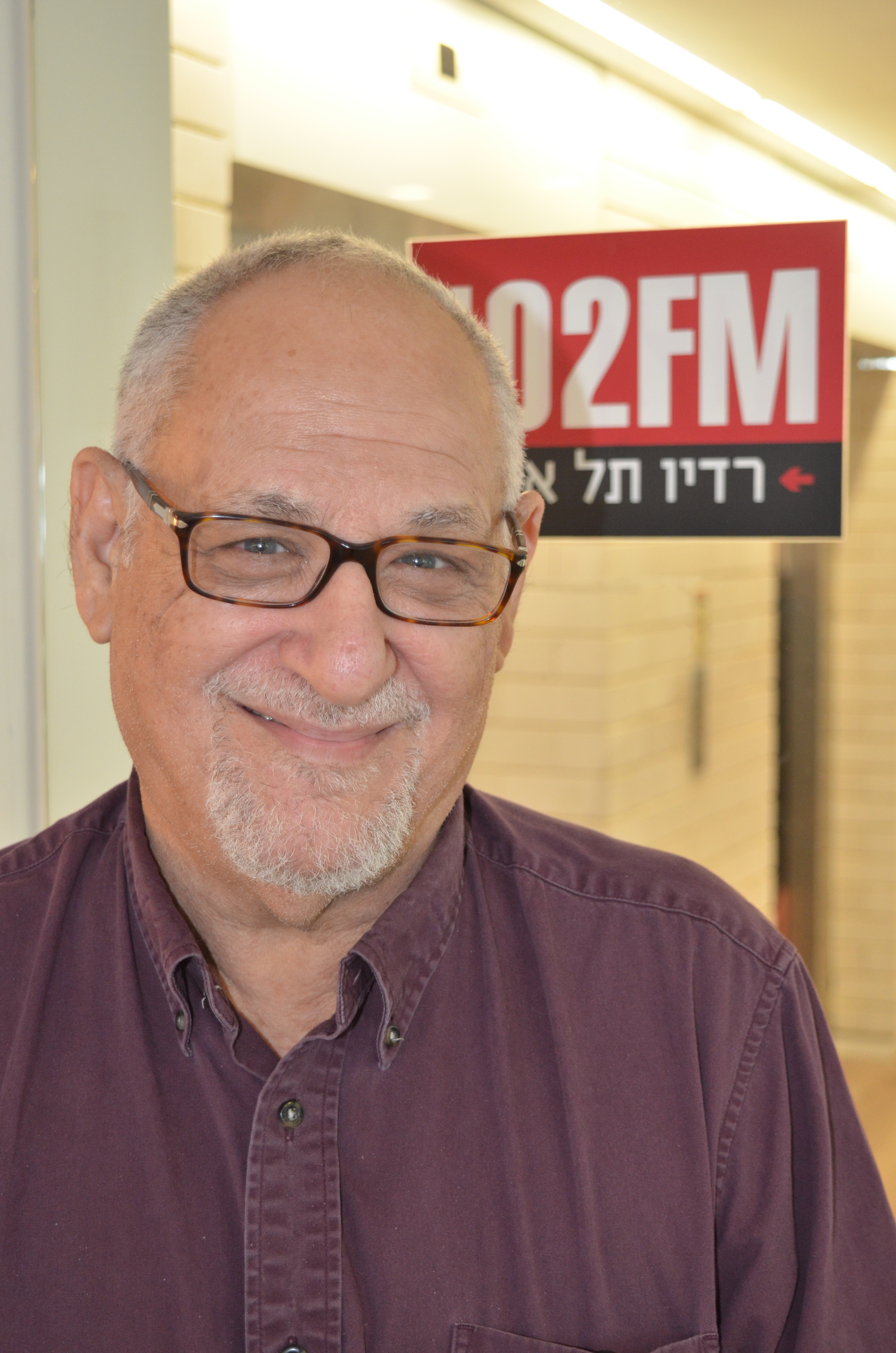
- Born: 1947 (age 78–79); Pontiac, Michigan, U.S.
- Education: University of Michigan (BA); Hebrew University of Jerusalem, Tel Aviv University (graduate studies)
- Occupations: Author, columnist
- Writing career
- Language: English, Hebrew
- Genres: Journalism, non-fiction, fiction

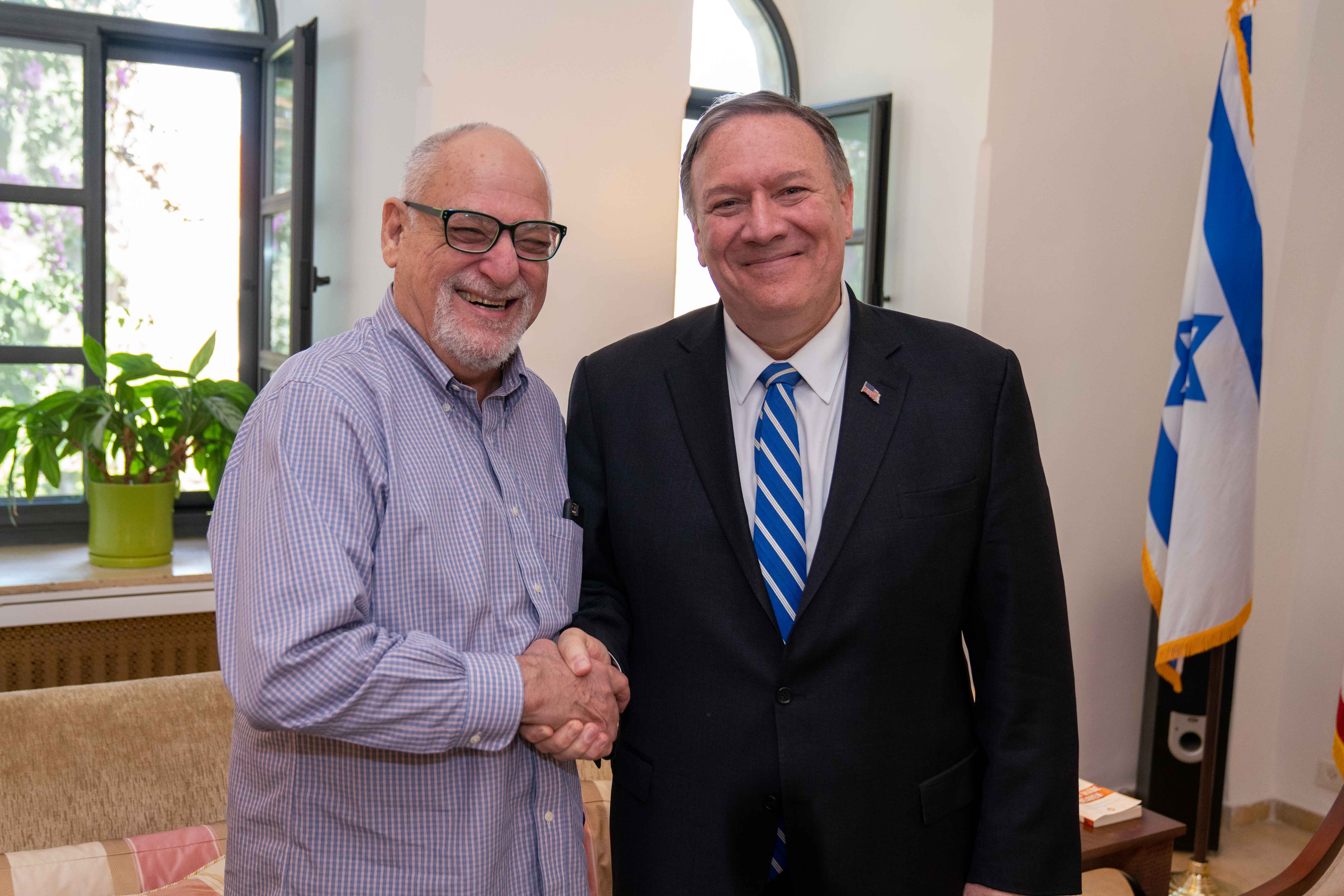
Chafets (left) with US Secretary of State Mike Pompeo in 2019

Zev Chafets (Hebrew: זאב חפץ; born 1947) is an American-Israeli author and columnist.

== Biography ==
Zev Chafets was born in 1947 in Pontiac, Michigan, and raised there. He graduated from the University of Michigan. In 1966-67 Chafets was president of the National Federation of Temple Youth. He immigrated to Israel after the Six-Day War in 1967. He spent a decade in the army, government service and politics. In 1977, he was appointed director of the Government Press Office, a post he held for five years during the administration of Prime Minister Menachem Begin. Chafets was an active participant in the Egyptian-Israeli peace process and a delegate to the first Israeli-Egyptian peace negotiations.

He is the author of fourteen books of fiction, media criticism, and social and political commentary, three of which have been named Notable Books of the Year by The New York Times. A review in The New York Times of his book Heroes and Hustlers called him "an Israeli Tocqueville." He is also the recipient of the 2008 Wilbur Award for his book A Match Made In Heaven. His book on Detroit, Devil's Night, earned him admission to the Michigan Monthly's Detroit Hall of Fame.

Chafets was the founding managing editor and staff columnist of The Jerusalem Report magazine. During an extended stay in the United States he was a staff columnist at the New York Daily News (beginning in 2000) and a frequent contributor to The New York Times Magazine. In 2008, his New York Times Magazine cover story on Mike Huckabee was a finalist for the National Magazine Award. In 2011, he received a Lifetime Achievement Award from the City of Pontiac, his American hometown.

Following his return to Israel in 2012, Chafets was a contributing columnist to Fox News Online (2013–2016) and Bloomberg Online (2017–2022). Many of his Bloomberg columns were reprinted in The Washington Post. In 2016 he was the co-host of The Presidential Podcast (Hebrew) on Radio Tel Aviv.

Chafets is a strong supporter of Israel. He has been a vocal critic of Arab dictatorships, Islamic radicalism, extremist groups such as Hezbollah and Hamas, and what he asserts is a pro-Palestinian bias in academia and parts of the mainstream media. He is also known for his opposition to ultra-orthodox religious political parties. In 2016, as the co-host of The Presidential Podcast (Hebrew) on Radio Tel Aviv, he opposed Donald Trump's candidacy but predicted, a few days before the election, that Trump would win.

Chafets resides in Tel Aviv, Israel. He has four children and five grandchildren. He is married to Leah Greenspan.

== Published works ==
=== Non-fiction ===
- Double Vision: How America's Press Distorts Our View of the Middle East (1985)
- Heroes and Hustlers, Hard Hats and Holy Men: Inside the New Israel (1986)
- Members of the Tribe (Bantam Hardcover) (1988)
- Devil's Night: And Other True Tales of Detroit (1990)
- A Match Made in Heaven: American Jews, Christian Zionists, and One Man's Exploration of the Weird and Wonderful Judeo-Evangelical Alliance (HarperCollins Hardcover - Jan 9, 2007)
- Cooperstown Confidential: Heroes, Rogues and the Inside Story of the Baseball Hall of Fame (2009, Bloomsbury USA)
- Rush Limbaugh: An Army of One (2010)
- Roger Ailes: Off Camera (2013)
- Remembering Who We Are: A Treasury of Conservative Commencement Addresses (2015)
- The Bridge Builder (2015)

=== Fiction ===
- Inherit the Mob (Random House) (1993)
- The Bookmakers (Random House) (1995)
- The Project (Warner Books) (1997)
- Whacking Jimmy (as William Wolf) ((Villard))
- Hang Time (Warner Books) (1996)

== Selected articles in magazines and newspapers ==
The New York Times

- The Tragedy of Detroit
- "Lives; No Regrets",
- A letter to the editor correcting the story,
- The two referenced versions of No Regrets, sung by Jimmy Barnes
- Little Willie John
- The Sy Empire
- A subsequent article correction
- Obama's Rabbi

== See also ==
- List of Jewish American authors
