= List of awards and nominations received by Olivia Rodrigo =

Olivia Rodrigo awards and nominations
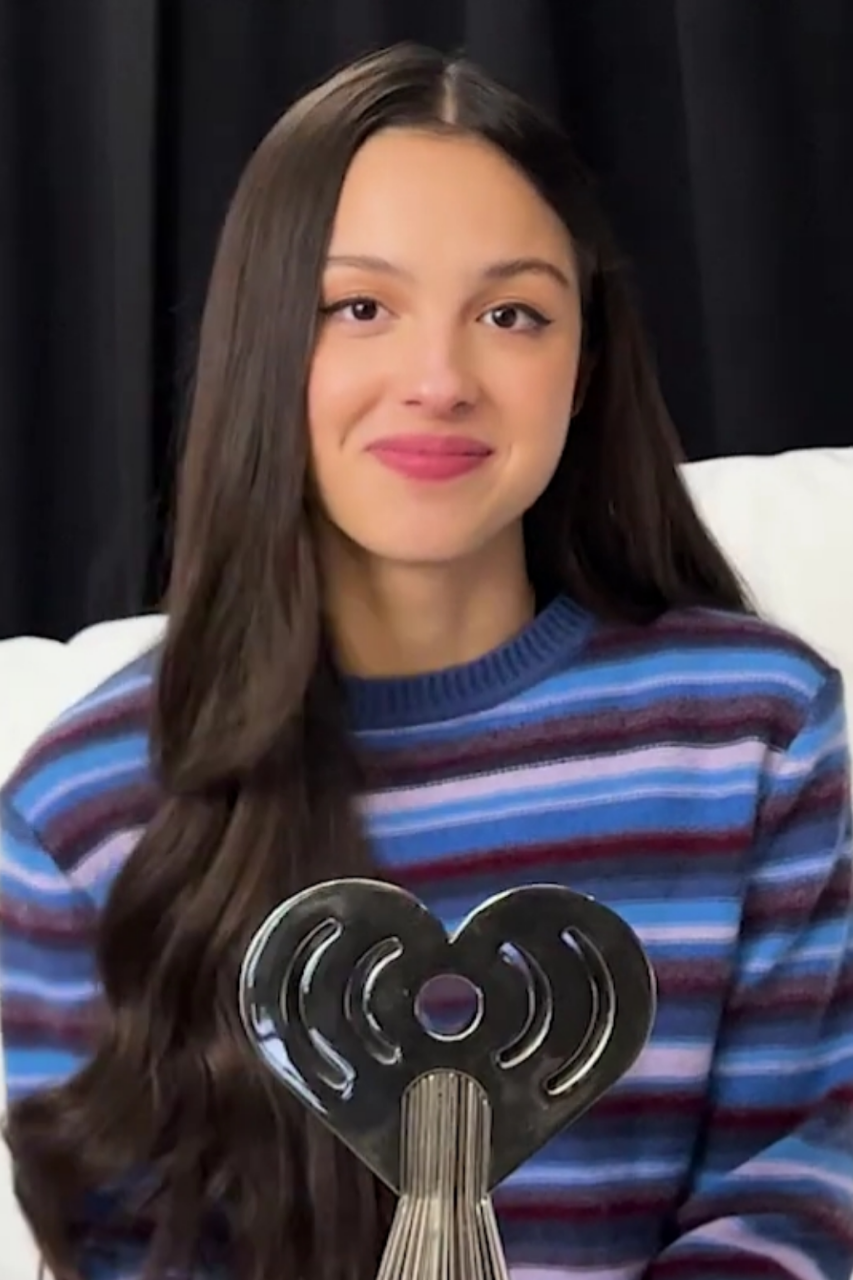
- Rodrigo for the 2024 iHeartRadio Music Awards
Awards and nominations
Award	Wins	Nominations
American Music Awards	1	7
Apple Music Awards	3	3
APRA Awards	0	1
ARIA Music Awards	0	2
ASCAP Pop Music Awards	7	7
Asia Pop 40	3	3
Billboard Women in Music	1	1
Billboard Music Awards	7	14
Billboard Live Music Awards	1	1
BMI Pop Awards	1	1
Bravo Otto	0	3
BreakTudo Awards	1	7
Brit Awards	1	4
Brit Billion Awards	1	1
Cannes Lions International Festival of Creativity	0	1
Ciclope Festival Awards	0	2
Clio Awards	1	1
Danish Music Awards	1	2
Fonogram-Hungarian Music Awards	0	1
GAFFA Awards (Denmark)	0	1
GAFFA Awards (Sweden)	1	1
Gaygalan Awards	0	2
Global Awards	0	2
Gold List	1	1
Guinness World Records	4	4
Grammy Awards	3	21
Guild of Music Supervisors Awards	0	1
Hollywood Music in Media Awards	2	2
iHeartRadio Music Awards	5	22
iHeartRadio Titanium Awards	1	1
Japan Gold Disc Award	1	1
Joox Malaysia Music Awards	2	2
Joox Thailand Music Awards	0	2
Juno Awards	1	1
Legacy Awards	0	1
Los 40 Music Awards	1	5
Meus Prêmios Nick	0	2
MTV Europe Music Awards	1	11
MTV Millennial Awards	0	1
MTV Millennial Awards Brazil	0	1
MTV Movie & TV Awards	1	2
MTV Video Music Awards	5	24
MTV Video Music Awards Japan	2	2
Myx Music Awards	1	1
New Music Awards	3	4
Nickelodeon Kids' Choice Awards	5	11
Nickelodeon Mexico Kids' Choice Awards	0	3
Nickelodeon Kids’ Choice Awards Abu Dhabi	1	1
NME Awards	1	2
NRJ Music Awards	1	5
Nylon Big Bold Brave Awards	1	1
Offizielle Deutsche Charts	2	2
The Official Big Top 40 Awards	4	4
People's Choice Awards	4	9
Pollstar Awards	0	5
Premios MUSA	0	4
Premios Odeón	1	3
Qmusic Top 40 Awards	0	1
Rockbjornen	0	1
RTHK International Pop Poll Awards	4	4
SEC Awards	0	6
Shots Awards	1	2
Society of Composers and Lyricists Awards	1	1
Swiss Music Awards	1	2
Universal Music’s Amplifier Award	1	1
UK Music Video Awards	0	2
Variety Hitmakers Awards	2	2
Webby Awards	4	5
WOWIE Awards	0	1
Žebřík Music Awards	1	3

Totals (Note: Certain award groups do not simply award one winner. They acknowledge several different recipients, have runners-up, and have third place. Since this is a specific recognition and is different from losing an award, runner-up mentions are considered wins in this award tally. For simplification and to avoid errors, each award in this list has been presumed to have had a prior nomination.)
- Wins: 96
- Nominations: 364

American singer-songwriter and actress Olivia Rodrigo has received numerous accolades, including three Grammy Awards, seven Billboard Music Awards, five MTV Video Music Awards, five iHeartRadio Music Awards, four People's Choice Awards, an American Music Award, a Brit Award, and a Juno Award.

Time named her as "Entertainer of the Year" for 2021 and she was included on Time's 100 Next list. In the same year, Music Week crowned her "Artist of Year". Rodrigo was the top songwriter on the Billboard Hot 100 Songwriters year-end chart for 2021. The following year, she was honored as Billboard's "Woman of the Year". Variety named her as the "Songwriter of the Year" in 2022 and "Storyteller of the Year" in 2023. The Ivors Academy called her the "biggest songwriter on the planet" in 2021. Rodrigo was also named the "Songwriter of the Year" at the ASCAP Pop Music Awards in 2022 and 2024.

She has joined the elite lists of Billboard 21 Under 21, Forbes 30 Under 30, Fortune 40 Under 40, Bloomberg 50, and Elle 100, ranking as one of the most influential people in global business.

== Awards and nominations ==
Award	Year (Note: Indicates the year of ceremony. Each year is linked to the article about the awards held that year, wherever possible.)	Recipient(s) and nominee(s)	Category	Result	Ref.
American Music Awards	2021	Herself	Artist of the Year	Nominated	
American Music Awards	2021	Herself	New Artist of the Year	Won	
American Music Awards	2021	Herself	Favorite Female Pop Artist	Nominated	
American Music Awards	2021	"Drivers License"	Favorite Trending Song	Nominated	
American Music Awards	2021	"Drivers License"	Favorite Music Video	Nominated	
American Music Awards	2021	"Drivers License"	Favorite Pop Song	Nominated	
American Music Awards	2021	Sour	Favorite Pop Album	Nominated	
Apple Music Awards	2021	Herself	Breakthrough Artist of the Year	Won	
Apple Music Awards	2021	Sour	Album of the Year	Won	
Apple Music Awards	2021	"Drivers License"	Song of the Year	Won	
APRA Awards	2022	"Drivers License"	Most Performed International Work	Nominated	
ARIA Music Awards	2021	Herself	Best International Artist	Nominated	
ARIA Music Awards	2024	Herself	Best International Artist	Nominated	
ARIA Music Awards	2026	Herself	Most Popular International Artist	Pending	
ASCAP Pop Music Awards	2022	Herself	Songwriter of the Year	Won	
ASCAP Pop Music Awards	2022	"Drivers License" (with Nigro)	Winning Songwriters and Publishers	Won	
ASCAP Pop Music Awards	2022	"Deja Vu" (with Nigro, Clark, Swift and Antonoff)	Winning Songwriters and Publishers	Won	
ASCAP Pop Music Awards	2022	"Good 4 U" (with Nigro, Williams and Farro)	Winning Songwriters and Publishers	Won	
ASCAP Pop Music Awards	2024	Herself	Songwriter of the Year	Won	
ASCAP Pop Music Awards	2024	"Vampire" (with Nigro)	Winning Songwriters and Publishers	Won	
ASCAP Pop Music Awards	2024	"Bad Idea Right?" (with Nigro)	Winning Songwriters and Publishers	Won	
Asia Pop 40	2021	Herself	Asia Pop 40 Artist of the Year	Won	
Asia Pop 40	2021	"Drivers License"	Asia Pop 40 Song of the Year	Won	
Asia Pop 40	2021	Sour	Asia Pop 40 Album of the Year	Won	
Billboard Women in Music	2022	Herself	Woman of the Year	Won	
Billboard Live Music Awards	2024	Herself	Touring Artist of The Year	Won	
Billboard Music Awards	2022	Herself	Top Artist	Nominated	
Billboard Music Awards	2022	Herself	Top New Artist	Won	
Billboard Music Awards	2022	Herself	Top Female Artist	Won	
Billboard Music Awards	2022	Herself	Top Hot 100 Artist	Won	
Billboard Music Awards	2022	Herself	Top Streaming Songs Artist	Won	
Billboard Music Awards	2022	Herself	Top Radio Songs Artist	Won	
Billboard Music Awards	2022	Herself	Top Billboard Global 200 Artist	Won	
Billboard Music Awards	2022	Herself	Top Billboard Global (Excl. U.S.) Artist	Nominated	
Billboard Music Awards	2022	"Good 4 U"	Top Hot 100 Song	Nominated	
Billboard Music Awards	2022	"Good 4 U"	Top Streaming Song	Nominated	
Billboard Music Awards	2022	"Good 4 U"	Top Radio Song	Nominated	
Billboard Music Awards	2022	"Good 4 U"	Top Billboard Global 200 Song	Nominated	
Billboard Music Awards	2022	Sour	Top Billboard 200 Album	Won	
Billboard Music Awards	2023	Herself	Top Female Artist	Nominated	
BMI Pop Awards	2022	"Deja Vu"	Award Winning Song	Won	
Bravo Otto	2022	Herself	Best International Singer	Nominated	
Bravo Otto	2023	Herself	Best International Singer	Nominated	
Bravo Otto	2024	Herself	Best International Singer	Nominated	
BreakTudo Awards	2021	Herself	International Revelation	Nominated	
BreakTudo Awards	2021	"Traitor"	Anthem of the Year	Won	
BreakTudo Awards	2021	"Drivers License"	International Hit	Nominated	
BreakTudo Awards	2021	"Good 4 u"	International Hit	Nominated	
BreakTudo Awards	2022	"Herself"	International Rising Artist	Nominated	
BreakTudo Awards	2023	"Vampire"	Anthem of the Year	Nominated	
BreakTudo Awards	2024	Herself	Global Artist of the Year	Nominated	
BreakTudo Awards	2026	Herself	International Female Artist	Pending	
BreakTudo Awards	2026	"Stupid Song"	International Hit	Pending	
Brit Awards	2022	Herself	International Artist	Nominated	
Brit Awards	2022	"Good 4 U"	International Song of the Year	Won	
Brit Awards	2024	Herself	International Artist	Nominated	
Brit Awards	2024	"Vampire"	International Song of the Year	Nominated	
BRIT Billion Awards	2023	Herself	—N/a	Won	
Cannes Lions International Festival of Creativity	2022	Made on iPad X Olivia Rodrigo	Entertainment Lions for Music	Nominated	
Ciclope Festival Awards	2021	"Deja Vu"	Visual Effects in a Music Video	Nominated	
Ciclope Festival Awards	2021	Sour Prom	Production Design in a Music Video	Nominated	
Clio Awards	2024	"Get Him Back!"	Best Music Video (Bronze)	Won	
Danish Music Awards	2021	Sour	International Album of the Year	Won	
Danish Music Awards	2021	"Drivers License"	International hit	Nominated	
Filipino Music Awards	2025	Herself	International Artist – People's Choice Awards	Nominated	
Filipino Music Awards	2026	Herself	International Artist – People's Choice Awards	Nominated	
Fonogram-Hungarian Music Awards	2024	Guts	Foreign Pop-Rock Album of the Year	Nominated	
GAFFA Awards (Denmark)	2022	Herself	International New Name of the Year	Nominated	
GAFFA Awards (Sweden)	2022	Herself	Foreign Upstart of the Year	Won	
Gaygalan Awards	2022	"Good 4 U"	International Song of the Year	Nominated	
Gaygalan Awards	2023	"Vampire"	Song of the Year	Nominated	
Global Awards	2022	Herself	Best Female	Nominated	
Global Awards	2022	Herself	Rising Star	Nominated	
Global Awards	2024	Herself	Best Female	Nominated	
Global Awards	2024	Herself	Best Fans	Nominated	
Global Awards	2024	Herself	Best Pop	Nominated	
Global Awards	2024	"Vampire"	Best Song	Nominated	
Gold List	2024	"Can't Catch Me Now"	Best Original Song	Won	
Grammy Awards	2022	"Drivers License"	Record of the Year	Nominated	
Grammy Awards	2022	"Drivers License"	Song of the Year	Nominated	
Grammy Awards	2022	"Drivers License"	Best Pop Solo Performance	Won	
Grammy Awards	2022	Sour	Album of the Year	Nominated	
Grammy Awards	2022	Sour	Best Pop Vocal Album	Won	
Grammy Awards	2022	Herself	Best New Artist	Won	
Grammy Awards	2022	"Good 4 U"	Best Music Video	Nominated	
Grammy Awards	2024	"Vampire"	Record of the Year	Nominated	
Grammy Awards	2024	"Vampire"	Song of the Year	Nominated	
Grammy Awards	2024	"Vampire"	Best Pop Solo Performance	Nominated	
Grammy Awards	2024	Guts	Album of the Year	Nominated	
Grammy Awards	2024	Guts	Best Pop Vocal Album	Nominated	
Grammy Awards	2024	"Ballad of a Homeschooled Girl"	Best Rock Song	Nominated	
Grammy Awards	2025	"Can't Catch Me Now"	Best Song Written for Visual Media	Nominated	
Grammy Awards	2027	"The Cure"	Record of the Year	Pending	
Grammy Awards	2027	"The Cure"	Song of the Year	Pending	
Grammy Awards	2027	"The Cure"	Best Pop Solo Performance	Pending	
Grammy Awards	2027	You Seem Pretty Sad for a Girl So in Love	Album of the Year	Pending	
Grammy Awards	2027	You Seem Pretty Sad for a Girl So in Love	Best Pop Vocal Album	Pending	
Grammy Awards	2027	"What's Wrong with Me" (with Robert Smith)	Best Rock Song	Pending	
Grammy Awards	2027	"What's Wrong with Me" (with Robert Smith)	Best Rock Performance	Pending	
Guild of Music Supervisors Awards	2024	"Can't Catch Me Now"	Best Song Written and/or Recording Created for a Film	Nominated	
Hollywood Music in Media Awards	2023	"Can't Catch Me Now"	Best Original Song in a Sci-Fi, Fantasy or Horror Film	Won	
Hollywood Music in Media Awards	2024	Olivia Rodrigo: Guts World Tour	Live Concert for Visual Media	Won	
iHeartRadio Music Awards	2021	Herself	Social Star Award	Won	
iHeartRadio Music Awards	2022	Herself	Female Artist of the Year	Won	
iHeartRadio Music Awards	2022	Herself	Best New Pop Artist	Won	
iHeartRadio Music Awards	2022	Herself	Best Fan Army	Nominated	
iHeartRadio Music Awards	2022	"Drivers License"	Song of the Year	Nominated	
iHeartRadio Music Awards	2022	"Drivers License"	Best Music Video	Nominated	
iHeartRadio Music Awards	2022	"Drivers License"	Best Lyrics	Nominated	
iHeartRadio Music Awards	2022	"Deja Vu"	Best Lyrics	Nominated	
iHeartRadio Music Awards	2022	"Good 4 U"	TikTok Bop of the Year	Won	
iHeartRadio Music Awards	2023	Herself	Favorite Tour Style	Nominated	
iHeartRadio Music Awards	2024	Herself	Artist of the Year	Nominated	
iHeartRadio Music Awards	2024	Herself	Pop Artist of the Year	Nominated	
iHeartRadio Music Awards	2024	"Vampire"	Song of the Year	Nominated	
iHeartRadio Music Awards	2024	"Vampire"	Pop Song of the Year	Nominated	
iHeartRadio Music Awards	2024	"Vampire"	Best Lyrics	Nominated	
iHeartRadio Music Awards	2024	"Vampire"	Best Music Video	Nominated	
iHeartRadio Music Awards	2024	"Livies"	Best Fandom	Nominated	
iHeartRadio Music Awards	2024	Guts	Pop Album of the Year	Won	
iHeartRadio Music Awards	2025	Herself	Favorite Tour Style	Nominated	
iHeartRadio Music Awards	2025	Encore Tank	Favorite Tour Tradition	Nominated	
iHeartRadio Music Awards	2025	Olivia Rodrigo with Chappell Roan	Favorite Surprise Guest	Nominated	
iHeartRadio Music Awards	2025	Olivia Rodrigo: GUTS World Tour	Favorite On Screen	Nominated	
iHeartRadio Titanium Awards	2022	"Good 4 U"	1 Billion Total Audience Spins on iHeartRadio Stations	Won	
Japan Gold Disc Award	2022	Herself	New Artist of the Year (Western)	Won	
Joox Malaysia Music Awards	2022	Herself	Top 5 International Artists	Won	
Joox Malaysia Music Awards	2022	"Drivers License"	Top 5 International Hits	Won	
Joox Thailand Music Awards	2022	"Drivers License"	International Song	Nominated	
Joox Thailand Music Awards	2022	Herself	Top Social Global Artist of the Year	Nominated	
Juno Awards	2022	Sour	International Album of the Year	Won	
Legacy Awards	2019	Bizaardvark	Best Children's Comedy Female Artist	Nominated	
Los 40 Music Awards	2021	Herself	Best International New Act	Nominated	
Los 40 Music Awards	2021	"Drivers License"	Best International Song	Nominated	
Los 40 Music Awards	2021	Sour	Best International Album	Won	
Los 40 Music Awards	2023	Herself	Best International Act	Nominated	
Los 40 Music Awards	2023	Guts	Best International Album	Nominated	
Los 40 Music Awards	2026	Herself	Best International Artist	Nominated	
Los 40 Music Awards	2026	You Seem Pretty Sad for a Girl so In Love	Best International Album	Nominated	
Meus Prêmios Nick	2021	"Good 4 U"	Challenge Hits of the Year	Nominated	
Meus Prêmios Nick	2021	"Good 4 U"	Video of the Year	Nominated	
MTV Europe Music Awards	2021	Herself	Best US Act	Nominated	
MTV Europe Music Awards	2021	Herself	Best Pop	Nominated	
MTV Europe Music Awards	2021	Herself	Best New	Nominated	
MTV Europe Music Awards	2021	Herself	Best Push	Won	
MTV Europe Music Awards	2021	"Drivers License"	Best Song	Nominated	
MTV Europe Music Awards	2023	"Vampire"	Best Song	Nominated	
MTV Europe Music Awards	2023	"Vampire"	Best Video	Nominated	
MTV Europe Music Awards	2023	Herself	Best Artist	Nominated	
MTV Europe Music Awards	2023	Herself	Best Pop	Nominated	
MTV Europe Music Awards	2023	Herself	Biggest Fans	Nominated	
MTV Europe Music Awards	2023	Herself	Best US Act	Nominated	
MTV Millennial Awards	2021	"Drivers License"	Global Hit of the Year	Nominated	
MTV Millennial Awards Brazil	2021	"Good 4 U"	Global Hit	Nominated	
MTV Movie & TV Awards	2022	Olivia Rodrigo: Driving Home 2 U	Best Music Documentary	Won	
MTV Movie & TV Awards	2022	High School Musical The Musical The Series - "The Rose Song"	Best Musical Moment	Nominated	
MTV Video Music Awards	2021	Herself	Best New Artist	Won	
MTV Video Music Awards	2021	Herself	Artist of the Year	Nominated	
MTV Video Music Awards	2021	"Drivers License"	Song of the Year	Won	
MTV Video Music Awards	2021	"Drivers License"	Push Performance of the Year	Won	
MTV Video Music Awards	2021	"Good 4 U"	Best Pop	Nominated	
MTV Video Music Awards	2021	"Good 4 U"	Song of Summer	Nominated	
MTV Video Music Awards	2022	"Brutal"	Video of the Year	Nominated	
MTV Video Music Awards	2022	"Brutal"	Best Editing	Nominated	
MTV Video Music Awards	2022	"Traitor"	Best Pop	Nominated	
MTV Video Music Awards	2022	Olivia Rodrigo: Driving Home 2 U	Best Longform Video	Nominated	
MTV Video Music Awards	2023	"Vampire"	Video of the Year	Nominated	
MTV Video Music Awards	2023	"Vampire"	Song of the Year	Nominated	
MTV Video Music Awards	2023	"Vampire"	Song of Summer	Nominated	
MTV Video Music Awards	2023	"Vampire"	Best Pop	Nominated	
MTV Video Music Awards	2023	"Vampire"	Best Editing	Won	
MTV Video Music Awards	2023	"Vampire"	Best Cinematography	Nominated	
MTV Video Music Awards	2024	Herself	Best Pop	Nominated	
MTV Video Music Awards	2024	"Get Him Back!"	Best Visual Effects	Nominated	
MTV Video Music Awards	2024	"Bad Idea Right?"	Best Art Direction	Nominated	
MTV Video Music Awards	2024	"Obsessed"	Best Cinematography	Nominated	
MTV Video Music Awards	2026	"Drop Dead"	Best Pop	Nominated	
MTV Video Music Awards	2026	"The Cure"	Best Alternative	Won	
MTV Video Music Awards	2026	"Stupid Song"	Song of Summer	Nominated	
MTV Video Music Awards	2026	You Seem Pretty Sad for a Girl So in Love	Best Album	Nominated	
MTV Video Music Awards Japan	2021	"Drivers License"	Best Western New Artist Video	Won	
MTV Video Music Awards Japan	2023	"Vampire"	Best Solo Artist Video: International	Won	
MTV Video Play Awards	2021	"Good 4 U"	Most Played Music Videos (Globally)	Placed	
MTV Video Play Awards	2021	"Deja Vu"	Most Played Music Videos (Globally)	Placed	
Myx Music Awards	2021	Herself	Global Achievement Award	Won	
New Music Awards	2022	Herself	AC New Artist of the Year	Won	
New Music Awards	2022	Herself	Top 40/CHR New Artist of the Year	Won	
New Music Awards	2022	Herself	Top 40/CHR Female Artist of the Year	Won	
New Music Awards	2024	"Vampire"	Top40/CHR Song of the Year	Nominated	
Nickelodeon Kids' Choice Awards	2022	High School Musical: The Musical: The Series	Favorite Female TV Star (Kids)	Won	
Nickelodeon Kids' Choice Awards	2022	Herself	Favorite Breakout Artist	Won	
Nickelodeon Kids' Choice Awards	2022	Herself	Favorite Global Music Star	Nominated	
Nickelodeon Kids' Choice Awards	2023	High School Musical: The Musical: The Series	Favorite Female TV Star (Kids)	Won	
Nickelodeon Kids' Choice Awards	2024	High School Musical: The Musical: The Series	Favorite Female TV Star (Kids)	Won	
Nickelodeon Kids' Choice Awards	2024	Herself	Favorite Female Artist	Nominated	
Nickelodeon Kids' Choice Awards	2024	Guts	Favorite Album	Won	
Nickelodeon Kids' Choice Awards	2024	Olivia Rodrigo: Guts Tour	Favorite Ticket of the Year	Nominated	
Nickelodeon Kids' Choice Awards	2026	"Drop Dead"	Favorite Song	Nominated	
Nickelodeon Kids' Choice Awards	2026	You Seem Pretty Sad for a Girl So in Love	Favorite Album	Nominated	
Nickelodeon Kids' Choice Awards	2026	Herself	Favorite Female Artist	Nominated	
Nickelodeon Mexico Kids' Choice Awards	2021	"Good 4 U"	Global Hit	Nominated	
Nickelodeon Mexico Kids' Choice Awards	2022	"Traitor"	Global Hit	Nominated	
Nickelodeon Mexico Kids' Choice Awards	2022	Herself	Favorite Global Artist	Nominated	
Nickelodeon Kids’ Choice Awards Abu Dhabi	2023	Herself	Favourite International Artist	Won	
NME Awards	2022	Herself	Best New Act in the World	Won	
NME Awards	2022	"Good 4 U"	Best Song in the World	Nominated	
NRJ Music Awards	2021	Herself	International Revelation of the Year	Won	
NRJ Music Awards	2021	"Good 4 U"	International Song of the Year	Nominated	
NRJ Music Awards	2023	"Vampire"	International Video of the Year	Nominated	
NRJ Music Awards	2023	"Herself"	International Female Artist of the Year	Nominated	
NRJ Music Awards	2026	"Herself"	International Female Artist of the Year	Nominated	
Nylon Big Bold Brave Awards	2021	Herself	Fearless Global Filipino	Won	
The Official Big Top 40 Awards	2021	"drivers license"	Number One Song	Won	
The Official Big Top 40 Awards	2021	"Deja Vu"	Number One Song	Won	
The Official Big Top 40 Awards	2021	"Good 4 u"	Number One Song	Won	
The Official Big Top 40 Awards	2023	"Vampire"	Number One Song	Won	
Offizielle Deutsche Charts Awards	2021	"Good 4 U"	Number One Song	Won	
Offizielle Deutsche Charts Awards	2023	"GUTS"	Number One Album	Won	
People's Choice Awards	2021	Herself	Female Artist of the Year	Nominated	
People's Choice Awards	2021	Herself	New Artist of the Year	Won	
People's Choice Awards	2021	"Good 4 U"	Song of the Year	Nominated	
People's Choice Awards	2021	"Good 4 U"	Music Video of the Year	Nominated	
People's Choice Awards	2021	Sour	Album of the Year	Won	
People's Choice Awards	2024	Herself	Female Artist of the Year	Nominated	
People's Choice Awards	2024	Herself	Pop Artist of the Year	Nominated	
People's Choice Awards	2024	"Vampire"	Song of the Year	Won	
People's Choice Awards	2024	Guts	Album of the Year	Won	
Planned Parenthood Award	2025	Herself	Catalyst of Change	Won	
Pollstar Awards	2023	Herself	New Headliner of the Year	Nominated	
Pollstar Awards	2023	Amex, Harry Styles, Herself, Ed Sheeran, BlackPink	Brand Partnership/Live Campaign of the Year	Nominated	
Pollstar Awards	2025	Guts World Tour	Major Tour of the Year	Nominated	
Pollstar Awards	2025	Guts World Tour	Pop Tour of the Year	Nominated	
Pollstar Awards	2025	Road Warrior of the Year	Marty Hom, Rolling Stones, Shakira, Olivia Rodrigo, Stevie Nicks	Nominated	
Premios Musa	2021	"Drivers License"	International Anglo Song	Nominated	
Premios Musa	2021	Herself	International Anglo Artist	Nominated	
Premios Musa	2023	"Vampire"	International Anglo Song	Nominated	
Premios Musa	2023	Herself	International Anglo Artist	Nominated	
Premios Odeón	2022	Herself	International Odeon Artist	Nominated	
Premios Odeón	2022	"Drivers License"	Best International Song	Nominated	
Premios Odeón	2022	Sour	Best International Album	Won	
Qmusic Top 40 Awards	2022	Herself	Best International Newcomer	Nominated	
Rockbjörnen	2021	"Drivers License"	Foreign Song of the Year	Nominated	
RTHK International Pop Poll Awards	2021	"Drivers License"	Top Ten International Gold Songs	Won	
RTHK International Pop Poll Awards	2022	"Good 4 U"	Top Ten International Gold Songs	Won	
RTHK International Pop Poll Awards	2023	"Vampire"	Top Ten International Gold Songs	Won	
RTHK International Pop Poll Awards	2023	Herself	Top Female Singer (Silver)	Won	
SEC Awards (Note: Note: The SEC Awards (formerly known as Séries em Cena Awards) is a Brazilian Award Show. It awards movies, tv series, music and internet influencers. It was created in 2019.)	2021	Drivers License	International Music of the Year	Nominated	
SEC Awards	2022	Good 4 U	International Music of the Year	Nominated	
SEC Awards	2022	Herself	International Female Artist of the Year	Nominated	
SEC Awards	2024	"Vampire"	International Music of the Year	Nominated	
SEC Awards	2024	Guts	International Album of the Year	Nominated	
SEC Awards	2024	Herself	International Female Artist of the Year	Nominated	
Shots Awards	2022	"Brutal"	Music Video of the Year	Nominated	
Shots Awards	2022	"Brutal"	Audio Company of the Year (Silver)	Won	
Society of Composers and Lyricists Awards	2024	"Can't Catch Me Now"	Outstanding Original Song for a Dramatic or Documentary Visual Media Production	Won	
Swiss Music Awards	2022	Herself	Best International Breaking Act	Won	
Swiss Music Awards	2022	Herself	Best International Solo Act	Nominated	
Universal Music’s Amplifier Award	2026	Herself	Amplifier Award	Won	
UK Music Video Awards	2021	Sour Prom	Best Special Video Project	Nominated	
UK Music Video Awards	2024	"Obsessed"	Best Pop Video – International	Nominated	
UK Music Video Awards	2026	"The Cure"	Best Production Design in a Video	Pending	
UK Music Video Awards	2026	"The Book of Love"	Best Editing in a Video	Pending	
Variety Hitmakers Awards	2021	Herself	Songwriter of the Year	Won	
Variety Hitmakers Awards	2023	Herself	Storyteller of the Year	Won	
Webby Awards	2022	Sour Patch	Best Social Influence Endorsement	Won	
Webby Awards	2024	"Vampire" (live piano performance)	Best Individual Performance	Won	
Webby Awards	2024	Guts	Arts, Culture & Lifestyle	Won	
Webby Awards	2024	Guts	Celebrity/Fan	Nominated	
Webby Awards	2024	"Vampire"	Music Video	Won	
WOWIE Awards	2022	Herself	The Iconic Debut Award	Nominated	
Žebřík Music Awards	2022	Herself	Best International Discovery (3rd)	Won	
Žebřík Music Awards	2022	"Good 4 U"	Best Video Clip	Nominated	
Žebřík Music Awards	2023	Herself	Best International Discovery	Nominated	

== Other accolades ==
=== World records ===
†	Indicates a former held world record

Name of publication, year the record was awarded, name of the record, and the name of the record holder
Publication	Year	World records	Record holder	Ref.
Guinness World Records	2021	† Fastest time for a music track to reach 100 million streams on Spotify	"Drivers License"	
Guinness World Records	2021	Most streamed non-Christmas track on Spotify in 24 hours	"Drivers License"	
Guinness World Records	2021	Most streamed track on Spotify in the first week	"Drivers License"	
Guinness World Records	2021	† Most streamed track on Spotify in one week (female)	"Drivers License"	

=== Listicles ===
Name of publisher, name of listicle, placement result, and year (s) listed
Publisher	Listicle	Result	Year (s)	Ref.
ASCAP	Songwriter of the Year	Placed	2022	
ASCAP	Songwriter of the Year	Placed	2024	
Billboard	Greatest Popstars: Rookie of the Year	Placed	2021	
Billboard	Hot 100 Songwriters	1st	2021	
Billboard	21 Under 21	6th	2021	
Billboard	21 Under 21	1st	2022	
Billboard	Billboard Women in Music: Woman of the Year	Placed	2022	
Billboard	55 Break-up Songs of All Time	12th "Drivers License"	2023	
Billboard	Billboard Live in Music: Touring Artist of the Year	Placed	2024	
Bloomberg	Bloomberg 50	Placed	2021	
Elle Canada	Elle 100: Women Change Makers	Placed	2022	
Forbes	30 Under 30	19th	2021	
Forbes	30 Under 30	18th	2022	
Forbes	All Star Alumni	Placed	2024	
Fortune	40 Under 40	Placed	2021	
Gold House	A100 Honor Trailblazer	Placed	2021	
Gold House	A100 Honor Trailblazer	Placed	2022	
Gold House	A100 Hall of Fame	Inducted	2024	
Insider	25 Most Iconic Record-Breaking Songs in Music History	Placed	2022	
Insider	50 Best Break-up Songs of the 21st Century	20th "Drivers License"	2022	
InStyle	The Best Met Gala Beauty Looks of All Time	16th	2023	
Maxim	Women of the Year Maxim Hot 100	Placed	2023	
Music Week	Artist of the Year	Placed	2021	
The New York Times	Breakout Stars of the Year	Placed	2021	
NPR	The Breakout Stars of the Year	7th	2021	
Paste	40 Best New Artists of the Year	Placed	2021	
Paste	100 Greatest Album of the 21st Century	10th "Sour"	2023	
Paste	100 Greatest Album of All Time	29th "Sour"	2023	
Rolling Stone	100 Best Debut Album of All Time	39th "Sour"	2022	
Rolling Stone	500 Greatest Album of All Time	358th "Sour"	2023	
Shock	Most outstanding Grammy's 'Best New Artists' of the 21st century	Placed	2022	
The Hollywood Reporter	25 Platinum Players in Music	21st	2023	
The Ivors Academy	Top 10 Songwriter of the Year	1st	2021	
Time	Entertainer of the Year	Placed	2021	
Time	Time 100 Next Phenoms (written by Gwen Stefani)	Placed	2021	
The Times	20 Best Solo Singers of this Century	16th	2023	
Time Out	45 Best Pop Songs of this Century	28th Drivers License	2023	
Variety	Power of Young Hollywood List	35th	2020	
Variety	Hitmakers: Songwriter of the Year	Placed	2021	
Variety	Hitmakers: Storyteller of the Year	Placed	2023	
WWD Superlatives	Rookie of the Year	Placed	2021	

== See also ==
- Grammy Award records—Artists who had been nominated for all four General Field awards in one night
