= Olivia Rodrigo =

American singer-songwriter and actress (born 2003)

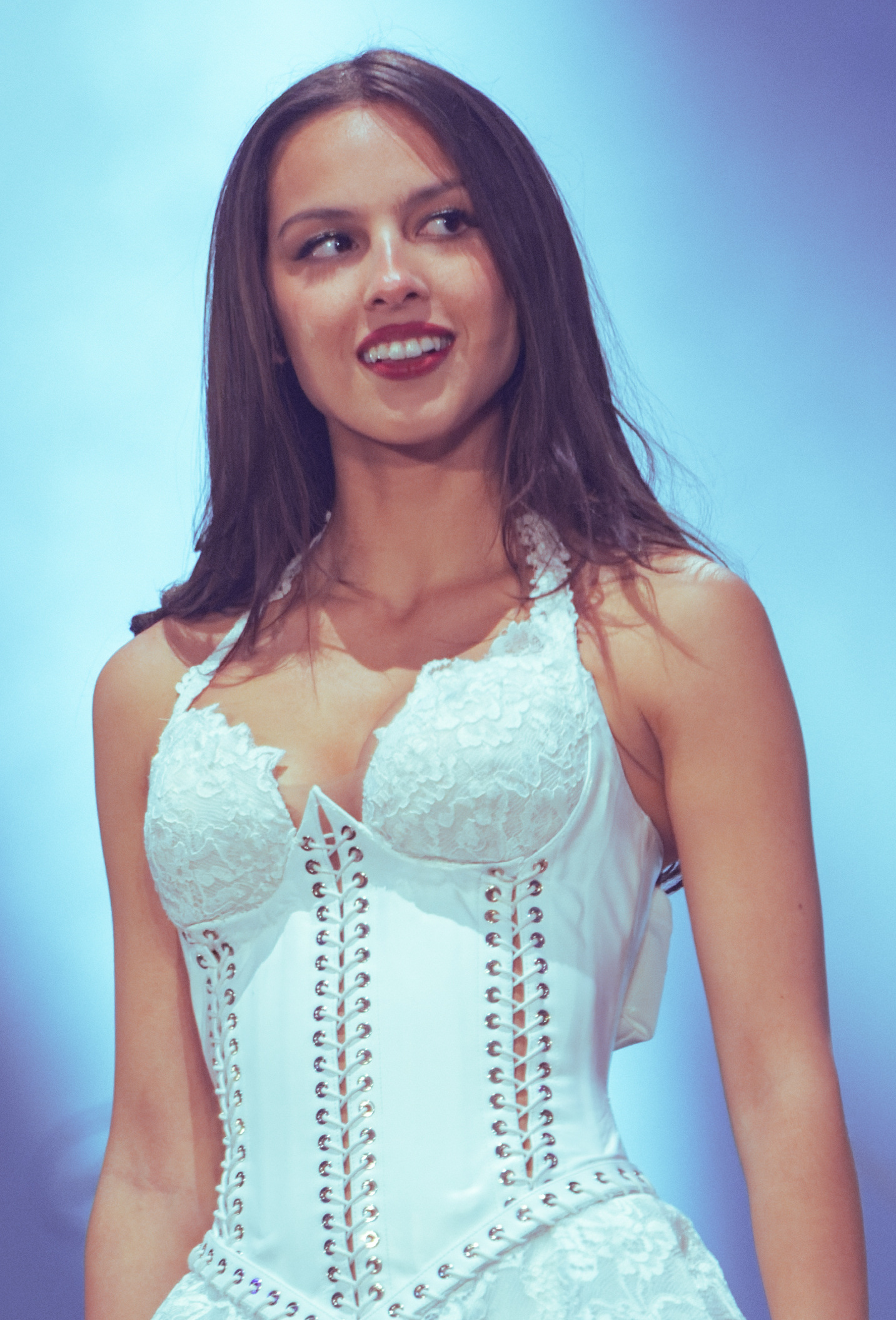
- Rodrigo performing at Glastonbury 2025
- Born: Olivia Isabel Rodrigo; February 20, 2003 (age 23); Murrieta, California, U.S.
- Occupations: Singer-songwriter; actress
- Years active: 2015–present
- Works: Discography; songs; performances
- Awards: Full list
- Musical career
- Genres: Pop; rock; folk
- Instruments: Vocals; piano; guitar
- Labels: Geffen; Interscope
- Olivia Rodrigo's voice Rodrigo speaks on youth vaccination Recorded July 14, 2021
- Website: oliviarodrigo.com

Olivia Isabel Rodrigo (born February 20, 2003) is an American singer-songwriter and actress. Rodrigo began her career as a child actress, appearing in commercials and the direct-to-video film An American Girl: Grace Stirs Up Success (2015). She found prominence with her leading roles in the Disney Channel series Bizaardvark (2016–2019) and the Disney+ series High School Musical: The Musical: The Series (2019–2022).

Rodrigo shifted her focus to music and signed with Geffen Records in 2020. Her debut studio album, Sour (2021), established her music career and topped ten national charts, including the US Billboard 200. It was preceded by the US Billboard Hot 100 number-one singles "Drivers License" and "Good 4 U". She was the subject of the 2022 documentary, Olivia Rodrigo: Driving Home 2 U. Her next two studio albums, Guts (2023) and You Seem Pretty Sad for a Girl So in Love (2026), expanded on her pop rock style and produced the US number-one singles "Vampire" and "Drop Dead", respectively, making Rodrigo the first artist to have their first three lead singles debut atop the US Hot 100.

Rodrigo's accolades include three Grammy Awards—including Best New Artist—five MTV Video Music Awards, and seven Billboard Music Awards. She was named Time's Entertainer of the Year in 2021, Billboard's Woman of the Year in 2022, and ASCAP's Pop Music Songwriter of the Year in both 2022 and 2024.

== Early life ==
Olivia Isabel Rodrigo was born on February 20, 2003, at the Rancho Springs Medical Center in Murrieta, California, to Jennifer (née Lee), a schoolteacher, and Chris, a family therapist. She is an only child, and grew up in neighboring Temecula. Rodrigo was born half-deaf in her left ear. She is half-Filipina and identifies as Filipino American. Her paternal grandparents and great-grandparents emigrated from the Philippines, and her family follows Filipino traditions, including preparation of cuisine. Her mother has German and Irish ancestry. She grew up listening to her parents' favorite alternative rock bands, such as No Doubt, Pearl Jam, the White Stripes, and Green Day.

Rodrigo attended Lisa J. Mails Elementary School in Murrieta, participating in its after-school musical theater program. At age five, her parents signed her up for vocal lessons with Jennifer Dustman, who enrolled Rodrigo in various local singing competitions. On Dustman's advice, Rodrigo's parents enrolled her in acting lessons. She began taking piano lessons at age nine. Rodrigo first became interested in songwriting after listening to country music, and she was playing guitar by age 12. In May 2010, at age seven, she first appeared onscreen in an Old Navy commercial.

== Career ==
=== 2015–2019: Career beginnings and acting ===
In 2015, at age 12, Rodrigo made her acting debut, in the lead role of Grace Thomas in the direct-to-video film An American Girl: Grace Stirs Up Success. She attended Dorothy McElhinney Middle School in Murrieta for a year, then moved to Los Angeles after landing an acting role in Disney Channel's Bizaardvark in 2016. Rodrigo was homeschooled from then until graduating in 2021. Starring as the character Paige Olvera, a guitarist, she played the role for three seasons.

In February 2019, Rodrigo was cast in the starring role of Nini Salazar-Roberts on the Disney+ series High School Musical: The Musical: The Series, which premiered in November of that year. She was praised for her performance, with Joel Keller of Decider calling her "especially magnetic". For the series, Rodrigo wrote and performed the promotional single "All I Want", released in November 2019. She left the show at the end of its third season to focus on her music career.

=== 2020–2022: Sour ===
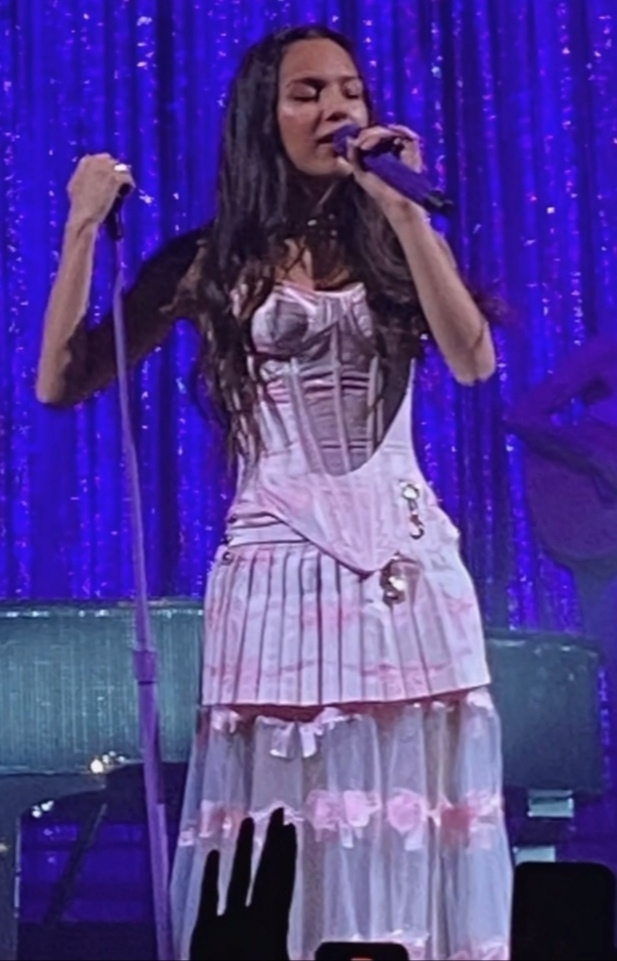
Rodrigo performing on the Sour Tour in 2022

Rodrigo signed with Geffen Records in 2020. She negotiated the record deal to secure for herself ownership of the masters of her music. On January 8, 2021, she released her debut single, "Drivers License", which she co-wrote with producer Dan Nigro. Within the week of its release, "Drivers License" was critically acclaimed, and broke Spotify's record twice for most daily streams ever for a non-holiday song with over 15.7 million global streams on January 11 and over 17 million global streams the next day. It went on to break another Spotify record for the first song in history to hit 80 million streams in seven days. The song debuted at number one on the US Billboard Hot 100, and reached number one in numerous other countries. Rodrigo stated in an interview that "It's been the absolute craziest week of my life ... My entire life just, like, shifted in an instant."

On April 1, 2021, Rodrigo released her follow-up single, "Deja Vu", which debuted at number eight on the Billboard Hot 100, making her the first artist to debut their first two releases in the top 10 of the Hot 100. It then went on to reach a new peak of number three a few weeks later. The third single preceding her debut album, "Good 4 U", followed on May 14, 2021, and became her second single to debut at number one on the Hot 100. Sour, her debut studio album, was released on May 21, 2021, to critical acclaim. Slate's Chris Molanphy said its first three singles alone established Rodrigo's "early status as Gen-Z's most versatile new artist". According to Clash critic Robin Murray, Rodrigo is regarded as one of Generation Z's finest artists, while Variety dubbed her "the voice of her generation" in its cover story of Rodrigo. Sour debuted at number one on the US Billboard 200 chart and spent a total of five weeks at the spot, becoming the longest reigning number-one album by a female artist in 2021.

In June 2021, Rodrigo premiered Sour Prom, a prom-themed concert film on YouTube. Three days later, Time named her Entertainer of the Year. In an Instagram post on December 24, 2021, Rodrigo uploaded a snippet of a Christmas song called "The Bels" that she wrote and recorded at age five. According to Billboard, Rodrigo closed 2021 as the bestselling singles artist worldwide, while placing eight songs on the year-end Global 200 chart, including "Drivers License" at number four, "Good 4 U" at number nine, and "Deja Vu" at number 27. In the US and UK, Sour was respectively the third and fourth bestselling album of 2021. Sour and "Drivers License" were also respectively Spotify's most-streamed album and song globally. The International Federation of the Phonographic Industry (IFPI) ranked Rodrigo as the tenth bestselling artist of 2021 and Sour as the second bestselling album of 2021.

To support Sour, Rodrigo embarked on her debut headlining tour, the Sour Tour, which ran from April to July 2022; it included stops in the United States, Canada, and Europe. In February 2022, Rodrigo signed with Lighthouse Management + Media, entering into a management arrangement with Aleen Keshishian and Zack Morgenroth. Rodrigo's Disney+ documentary film Olivia Rodrigo: Driving Home 2 U, which details the making of Sour, was released on March 25, 2022. Rodrigo received seven nominations at the 64th Annual Grammy Awards, including Best New Artist, Album of the Year and Best Pop Vocal Album for Sour, and Record of the Year, Best Pop Solo Performance and Song of the Year for "Drivers License". She won the awards for Best New Artist, Best Pop Vocal Album for Sour, and Best Pop Solo Performance for "Drivers License". In 2022, while crafting her next album, Guts, Rodrigo attended a poetry class at University of Southern California, and ended up repurposing one of her homework pieces into the song "Lacy", which would appear on the album's tracklist.

=== 2023–2025: Guts ===
On August 16, 2023, Rodrigo became the youngest artist to receive the Brit Billion Award for achieving over one billion digital streams in the United Kingdom. She was the 19th artist to receive a BRIT Billion Award. Rodrigo's second album, Guts, was released on September 8, 2023, and debuted atop the Billboard 200. She stated that the album was about "growing pains" and self-discovery. Going into the album cycle, she felt that she had grown "10 years" between the ages of 18 and 20. Guts received critical acclaim from various outlets and was later declared by BBC News as the most critically acclaimed album of 2023. The album's lead single, "Vampire", was released on June 30. It became Rodrigo's third single to debut atop the Billboard Hot 100, making her the first artist ever to debut the lead singles from two career-opening albums at No. 1 on the Hot 100. The album's second single, "Bad Idea Right?", was released on August 11, 2023, and reached the top 10 in the US and UK.

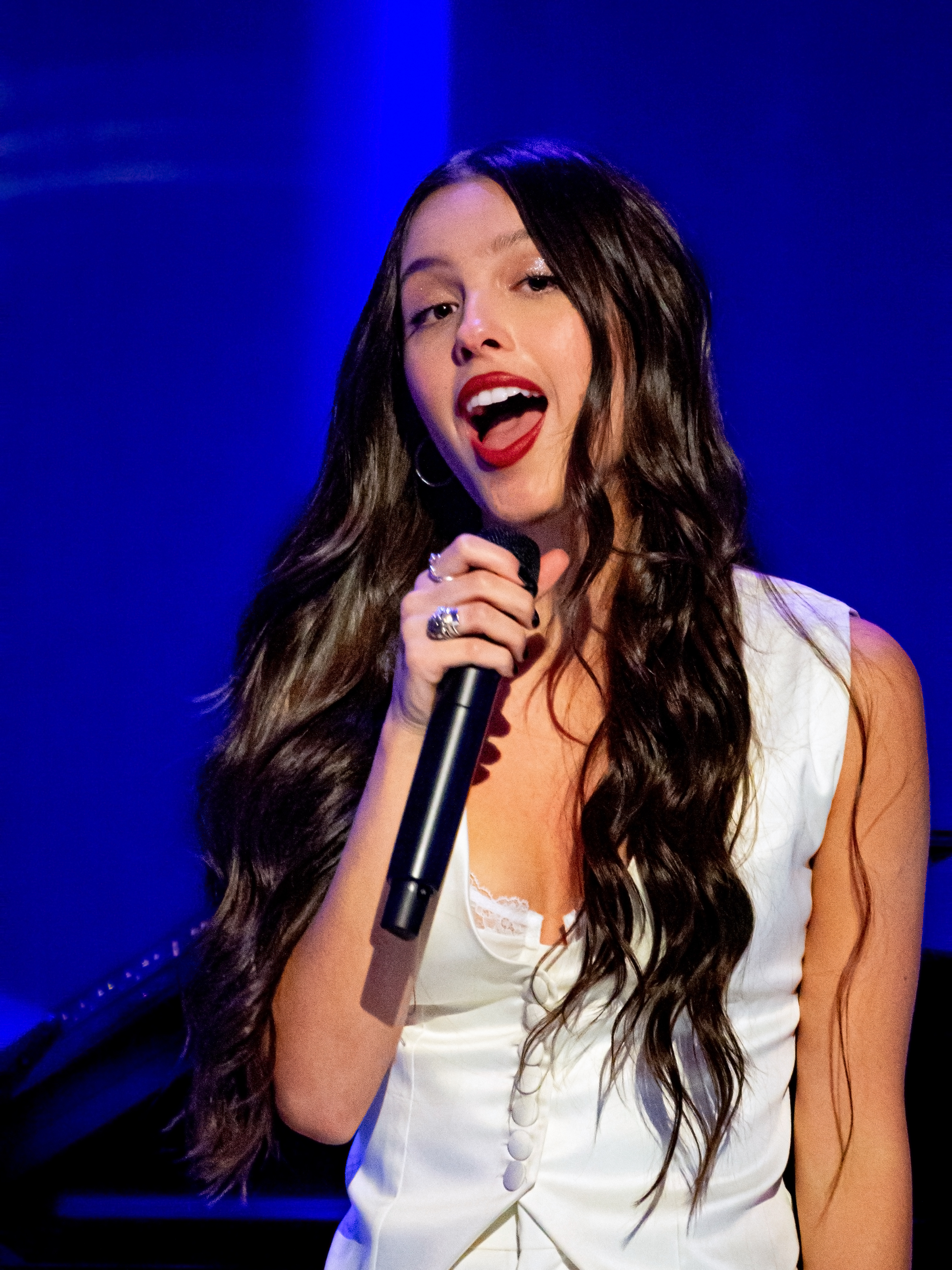
Rodrigo performing at the Theatre at Ace Hotel in October 2023

On October 9, 2023, Rodrigo performed songs from Guts in an exclusive concert in partnership with American Express at Los Angeles Theater at Ace Hotel. All proceeds from ticket sales went to her Fund 4 Good nonprofit organization. On October 18, 2023, Rodrigo announced that the four secret tracks released on limited vinyl editions of Guts would be released as a limited vinyl-exclusive EP to commemorate Record Store Day (RSD) Black Friday. The EP Guts: The Secret Tracks ranked as one of the top sellers during Record Store Day. On November 3, Rodrigo released the song "Can't Catch Me Now" for The Hunger Games: The Ballad of Songbirds & Snakes. The song won the Hollywood Music in Media Award for Best Original Song in a Sci-Fi, Fantasy or Horror Film at the 2023 ceremony.

To support Guts, Rodrigo embarked on her second headlining tour, the Guts World Tour, from February 2024 to July 2025, visiting North America, Europe, Asia, and Oceania. On March 22, 2024, Rodrigo released a deluxe version of Guts, titled Guts (Spilled), with five additional songs, including the four secret tracks from the vinyl variants. On April 13, 2024, Rodrigo made a special guest appearance at No Doubt's Coachella show, where she performed the band's 2000 single "Bathwater" alongside them. On October 2, 2024, Rodrigo announced the Guts World Tour concert film, which was released on Netflix on October 29.

Rodrigo performed at several music festivals in June 2025. On June 7, she headlined the second day of the Governors Ball, where she performed a cover of "Burning Down the House" with musician David Byrne, founding member of Talking Heads. She was the headlining act for the 2025 BST Hyde Park Show on June 27, with support from the Last Dinner Party and Girl in Red. Two days later, on June 29, she headlined the final day of the 2025 Glastonbury Festival and performed on the Pyramid Stage in her largest performance in the UK to date. Her concert included a guest appearance by Robert Smith, with whom Rodrigo sang two songs by the Cure, "Just like Heaven" and "Friday I'm in Love". On August 1, she headlined the second day of Lollapalooza Chicago 2025, with Weezer guesting to perform the songs "Buddy Holly" and "Say It Ain't So" with her. Rodrigo was featured in the documentary film Lilith Fair: Building a Mystery – The Untold Story (2025), reflecting on the legacy of the all-female music festival. On November 9, Rodrigo teamed up with Feist to perform a rendition of "We're Going to Be Friends" by the White Stripes at the band's Rock and Roll Hall of Fame induction ceremony.

=== 2026–present: You Seem Pretty Sad for a Girl So in Love ===
Rodrigo performing during the Unraveled Tour's Chicago stop in October 2026

On April 2, 2026, Rodrigo announced her third studio album, You Seem Pretty Sad for a Girl So in Love. Its lead single, "Drop Dead", was released on April 17 and debuted at number one on the Billboard Hot 100, extending her record as the first artist to debut the lead singles from their first three albums at the summit. "The Cure" was released on May 22 as the album's second single, followed by "Stupid Song" as its third single alongside its release, accompanied by a music video. Released on June 12, You Seem Pretty Sad for a Girl So in Love debuted at number one on the US Billboard 200 and the UK Albums Chart, marking Rodrigo's largest first-week sales in both countries. Her third-consecutive US number-one album, it made her the first artist to have their first three lead singles and studio albums debut atop the Billboard Hot 100 and Billboard 200. In the UK, she became the youngest international artist to earn more than 100,000 opening-week units since Britney Spears in 2004.

On April 18, Rodrigo appeared as a surprise guest on Addison Rae's set at Coachella 2026 and debuted "Drop Dead" live. On April 30, Rodrigo announced her third concert tour, the Unraveled Tour, in support of You Seem Pretty Sad for a Girl So in Love. Comprising 86 dates across North America and Europe, the tour commenced on September 25, 2026, in Hartford, United States, and is set to conclude on May 10, 2027, in London, England. Supporting acts include Devon Again, Die Spitz, Grace Ives, the Last Dinner Party, and Wolf Alice. Rodrigo appeared as both host and musical guest on Saturday Night Live on May 2, 2026; she performed "Drop Dead" and debuted another track, "Begged". During her surprise set at Primavera Sound on June 6, she debuted her new track, "What's Wrong with Me" with Robert Smith of the Cure. On July 31, Rodrigo made a surprise appearance during the Smashing Pumpkins' set at Lollapalooza, performing "Thirty-Three" with frontman Billy Corgan.

Rodrigo organized Daisy Chain Fields, an all-female music festival that took place on August 29, 2026, in Irvine, California, inspired by the 1990s Lilith Fair concerts. All net proceeds were directed towards charities for women and girls. In support of Daisy Chain Fields, she released the charity single "Serena Joy", named after a character in Margaret Atwood's The Handmaid's Tale. A remix of the You Seem Pretty Sad for a Girl So in Love track "Expectations" featuring American singer Chappell Roan was released alongside a music video on October 15. On November 5, Rodrigo released her first Christmas song, "Take Me Home (4 Christmas)", inspired by "Christmas Wrapping" by the Waitresses.

== Artistry ==
=== Influences ===
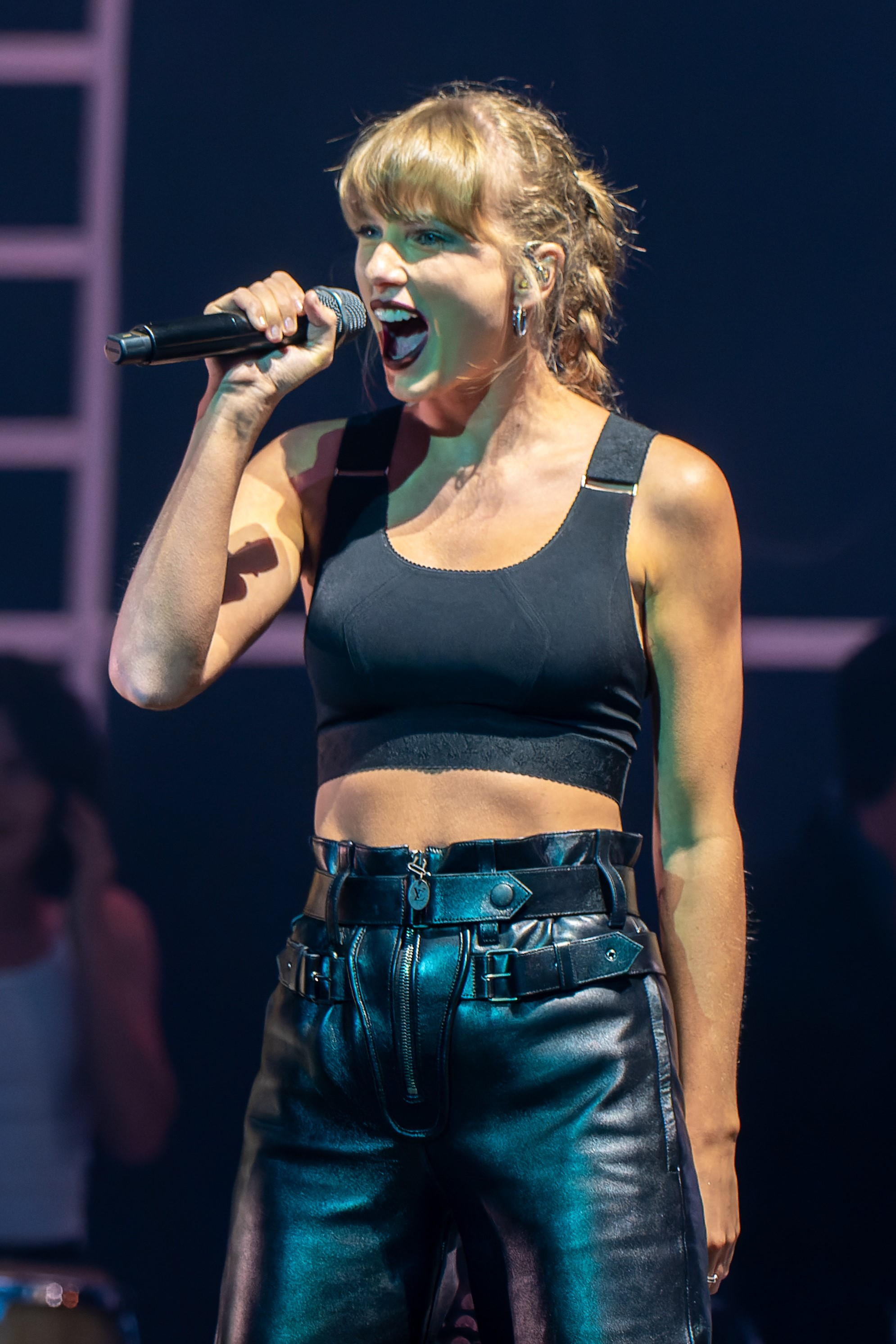
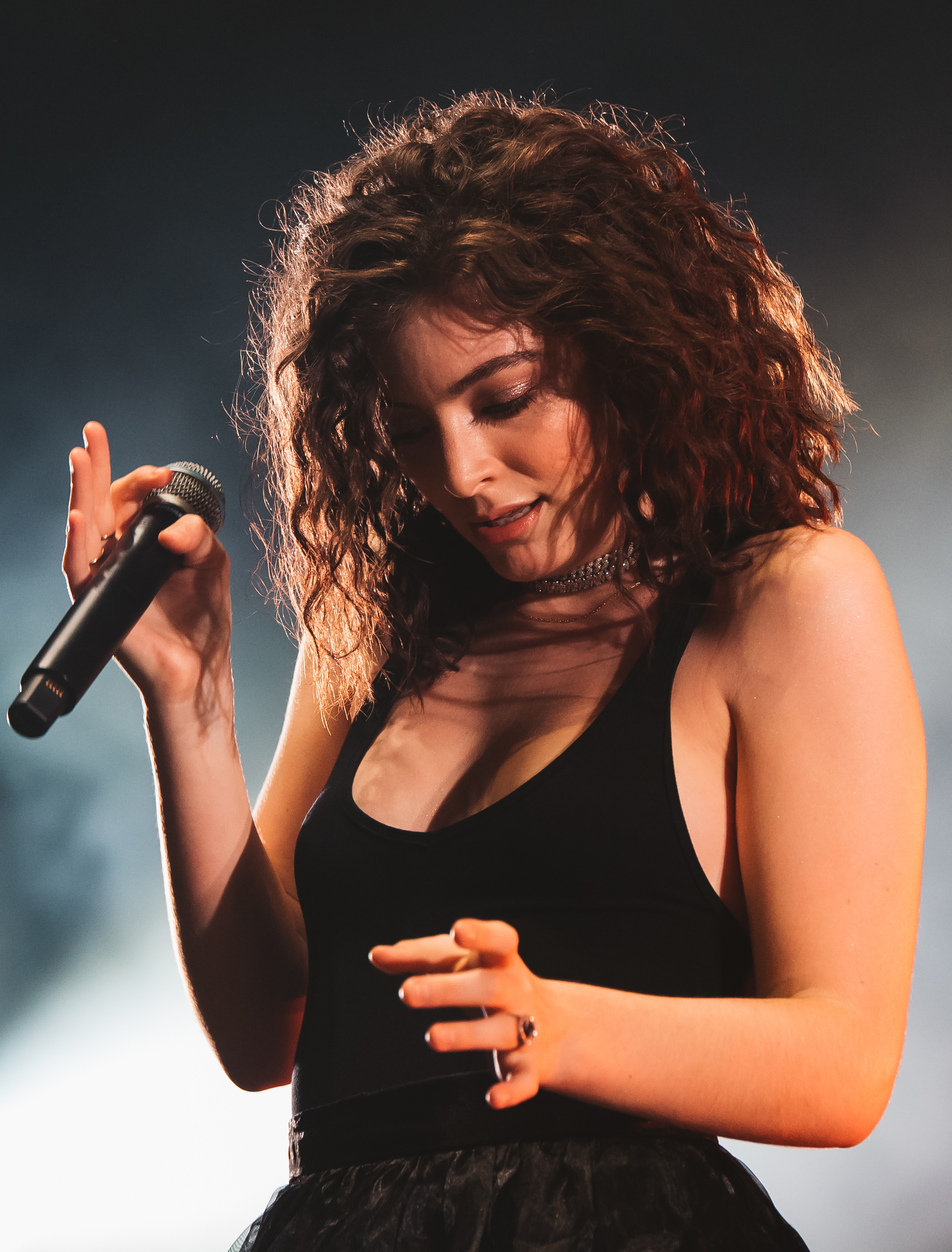
Rodrigo credits Taylor Swift (left) and Lorde (right) as her main musical influences.

In 2021, Rodrigo named Taylor Swift and Lorde as her idols and primary musical inspirations, and called herself Swift's biggest fan "in the whole world". She said the White Stripes' Elephant is the album she listens to most, and called band member Jack White her "hero of all heroes" in 2022. Other stated influences on Rodrigo's debut studio album include Alanis Morissette, Kacey Musgraves, Fiona Apple, St. Vincent, Cardi B, Gwen Stefani, Avril Lavigne, Lily Allen, and Lana Del Rey. Guts was primarily inspired by her punk and alternative rock influences, ranging from Babes in Toyland and Rage Against the Machine. For You Seem Pretty Sad for a Girl So in Love, she was influenced by post-punk bands and has cited the Cure, New Order, Depeche Mode, and Siouxsie and the Banshees. She has also called Kathleen Hanna of Bikini Kill and Courtney Love of Hole her "heroes". Aesthetically, her fashion has been described as representing the "kinderwhore" style that was popularized by Courtney Love and Kat Bjelland in the 1990s.

=== Songwriting and voice ===
Rodrigo's voice type is soprano. Media outlets generally describe her music as pop, rock, and folk. Her musical style has been labeled more specifically as alternative pop, bedroom pop, folk-pop, indie pop, pop-punk, pop rock, indie rock, power pop, post-punk, new wave, and teen pop. Rodrigo stated that she wants to be a songwriter and not "the biggest pop star that ever lived", and she chose to sign with Interscope/Geffen Records because its CEO John Janick praised her songwriting, not her "potential star quality". Music journalist Laura Snapes called Rodrigo a "flag-bearer" for a new wave of songwriters who incline towards power ballads "that are as emotional as ever, but project that emotion inward, trading bombast for hush", and described her musical style as rooted in heartache, mental health, and sadness, without being melodramatic, expressing more realistic perspectives than resilient.

== Other ventures ==
=== Products and endorsements ===
Rodrigo was announced as brand ambassador of the phone accessory company Casetify, under a year-long partnership, in December 2021. She creative directed the "Hardened Hearts" phone case collection, which was inspired by her debut album, Sour, and the '90s and Y2K visual aesthetics. She became consumer beauty brand Glossier's first ever celebrity partner in April 2022. Rodrigo collaborated with Sony Electronics to release a special edition of their true wireless Linkbuds S earbuds in September 2023. She and Health-Ade introduced the "Good 4 Ur Guts" smoothie in December 2023, which was available in Erewhon stores through January 14, 2024. In November 2024, Rodrigo became the global brand ambassador for Lancôme. In October 2025, she partnered with American Express for an exclusive concert experience for Platinum Card members at the Park Avenue Armory in New York City, marking a continuation of her collaboration with the brand during the Guts World Tour.

In January 2026, Rodrigo appeared in Miu Miu's advertisement campaign for their spring/summer collection. That June, she collaborated with the Lego Group on a collection of five LEGO Editions sets. In July, she was included in the online game platform Fortnite as a non-player character to promote her album You Seem Pretty Sad for a Girl So in Love. Her in-game appearance, based on her cheerleader look and the outfit she wears on the album cover, are available for purchase as outfits for the player character. In August, Rodrigo partnered with Taco Bell to launch "You Seem Pretty Pink for a Baja Blast".

=== Philanthropy and activism ===
Rodrigo and her Bizaardvark co-star Madison Hu teamed up with Instagram #KindComments to encourage their fans to spread kindness and foster positivity on social media from 2017 to 2018. Rodrigo and Hu further teamed up with non-profit organization My Friend's Place for their 30th anniversary, to help homeless youth find shelter, food, work, education, and healthcare. The event was hosted by Jack Black and raised over $740,000 for local homeless youth. Also in 2018, Rodrigo was named an institute speaker and panelist for the Geena Davis Institute on Gender in Media. In December that year, she became the face of "She Can STEM" campaign.

In February 2021, Rodrigo released her merchandise line, "Spicy Pisces T-shirts", on her website, with all proceeds benefitting the non-governmental organization She's the First which sponsors young girls' scholarship and education. In June 2021, she sold her clothes, wardrobe and all items from her music videos on Depop and 100% of all proceeds from 'Sour Shop' was donated to charitable organizations. Rodrigo donated a portion of her Sour Tour platinum ticket sales to Women for Women International which supports female survivors of war by helping them rebuild their lives after war devastation. On November 18, 2021, she donated a signed Gibson guitar to #VenturesIntoCures program for auction and all proceeds went to life-saving research to treat and cure epidermolysis bullosa. In December, she joined Katy Perry, Kelly Clarkson, and Billy Porter with Musicians on Call in the 2nd Annual Virtual Concert "Hope for the Holidays" to bring uplifting performances and messages of hope to hospital patients via virtual concert.

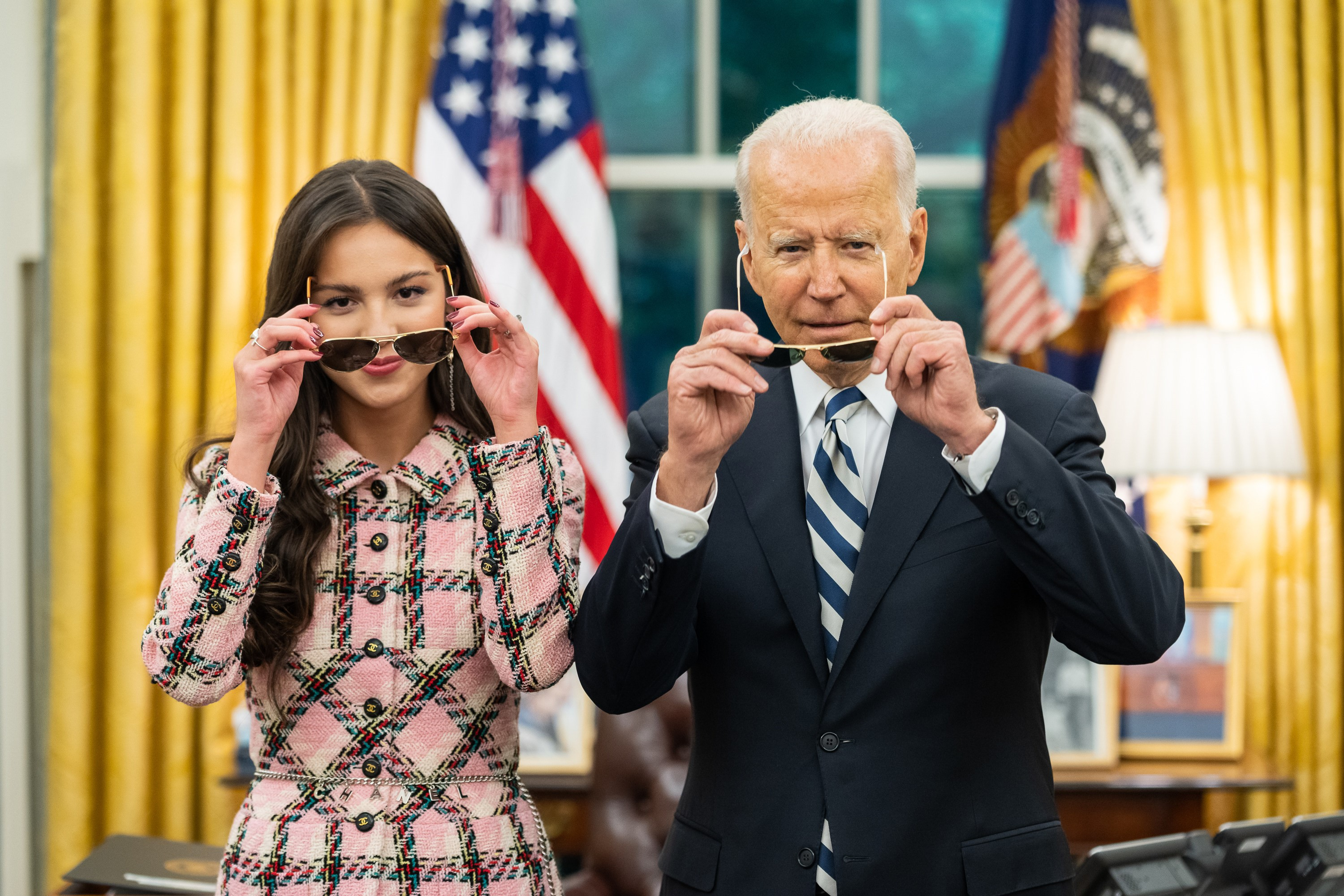
Rodrigo posing with US president Joe Biden as part of a campaign promoting COVID-19 vaccinations to youth

On July 13, 2021, Rodrigo was involved in a White House effort to promote COVID-19 vaccinations among young people in the US. She met with President Joe Biden, Vice President Kamala Harris, and Chief Medical Advisor Anthony Fauci, to discuss her efforts. CNN reported that Rodrigo would record videos about the importance of young people getting vaccinated, including answering questions the youth have regarding the vaccination.

Rodrigo identifies as a feminist and has been described as a feminist icon. Following the US Supreme Court's 2022 overturning of Roe v. Wade, Rodrigo performed "Fuck You" with English singer Lily Allen at Glastonbury Festival. She prefaced the performance by dedicating it to the associate justices who voted to overturn Roe, saying: "I'm devastated and terrified. So many women and so many girls are going to die because of this. I wanted to dedicate this next song to the five members of the Supreme Court who have showed us that at the end of the day, they truly don't give a shit about freedom. The song is for the justices." In October 2026, Rodrigo condemned Cornell University for their handling of the 2024 Cornell University rape allegations, saying: "Shame on Cornell and on every institution who protects rapists and abusers over women. I stand with Jane Doe. Her bravery reverberates across the country and the crimes against her will not go unpunished."

On November 20, 2022, Rodrigo and other celebrities joined co-founders Eddie Vedder and Jill Vedder for the Third Annual Venture Fundraising event, which helped raise more than $1.3 million that month and $6 million for the next three years to find a cure for epidermolysis bullosa and other rare diseases. In December 2022, Rodrigo joined Chris Stapleton, Selena Gomez, and others to donate exclusive items to the second annual ASCAP Foundation, which supports music education and talent development programs across the US. Also that month, Rodrigo took part in that year's annual virtual concert, "Musicians on Call", with 30 different artists, which brought holiday classic performances and videos of messages of hope to patients, families, and health-care workers in more than 5,000 US hospitals. In January 2023, Rodrigo joined various musicians in donating items to the MusiCares Foundation Charity Relief Auction to help struggling musicians with their financial needs.

Rodrigo launched a charity fund called Fund 4 Good, aimed at supporting reproductive healthcare of women, in October 2023. She told People that the motive of the non-profit is to raise awareness "for certain groups that are championing women's issues in America and all of the other territories [...] it's going to be a very fulfilling and hopefully productive experience." In January 2024, she donated items for charity auction and proceed went to MusiCares and Grammy Museum Foundation. A portion of the profits from the US leg of the Guts World Tour went to the fund and supported the National Network of Abortion Funds. Condoms and Plan B pills were distributed at Rodrigo's St. Louis concert on March 12, 2024, where abortion was illegal under state law. A portion of the profits from the Canadian leg of the tour would go to the fund and support 600 women's shelters in Canada. For the European leg of the tour, Rodrigo donated to Women Against Violence Europe, in order to prevent all women and their children from any type of violence. In October 2024, Rodrigo donated all net proceeds from her sold-out Philippines concert to Jhpiego, a women's health global organization with decades of lifesaving work in the Philippines. Rodrigo endorsed Kamala Harris in the 2024 United States presidential election.

In July 2025, she spoke out against the "horrific and completely unacceptable" conditions in Palestine during the Gaza war, saying "there is no child in Israel, Palestine or anywhere in the world who deserves to suffer through what we're seeing these children have to endure". She donated to UNICEF and encouraged her followers to do so as well.

In September 2025, Rodrigo criticized the ABC network over the suspension of Jimmy Kimmel, calling the decision "blatant censorship and abuse of power", and expressed solidarity with Kimmel and SAG-AFTRA. She also signed an ACLU open letter supporting free speech and condemning Kimmel's suspension. In October 2025, Rodrigo donated all ticket proceeds from her American Express intimate concert to her Fund 4 Good initiative, which supports women's and girls' rights, reproductive freedom, and education. Later that month, she shared a pair of Instagram Stories highlighting civilian casualties in Gaza and encouraging donations to humanitarian organizations, tagging initiatives such as Human IT Project and The Slow Factory. In November 2025, Rodrigo criticized the US Department of Homeland Security (DHS) after her song "All-American Bitch" was used in a government video without authorization, writing, "Don't ever use my songs to promote your racist, hateful propaganda." DHS later responded, stating that Rodrigo should "thank them for their service, not belittle their sacrifice." Following Rodrigo's response, the soundtrack was removed from the clip.

In January 2026, it was announced that Rodrigo would contribute a track to the charity compilation album Help(2) in support of War Child and participate in a charity auction to raise funds for humanitarian and medical aid efforts in Sudan. At the Resonator Awards during Grammy Awards week in late January 2026, Rodrigo wore an "ICE Out" pin as part of the #BeGood campaign protesting the killing of Renée Good by an ICE agent in Minneapolis. On August 29, 2026, Rodrigo performed at her own festival, Daisy Chain Fields, from which all ticket proceeds went to organizations Planned Parenthood, Jhpiego, and Baby2Baby among others.

In October 2026, Rodrigo endorsed Amy Acton for governor of Ohio in the 2026 Ohio gubernatorial election, wearing a shirt that read "Dr. Amy Acton for Governor" during her Unraveled Tour concert in Columbus, Ohio.

== Personal life ==
Rodrigo is partially deaf in her left ear. She once said on the Awards Chatter podcast: "I never knew until kindergarten or so when they're doing the tests on all the kids, and they were like, 'Oh, you're a little hard of hearing.'" In 2021 Rodrigo, stated that she grew up on a vegetarian diet, being raised that way by her mother who is a vegeterian, while also noting that she herself no longer follows a vegetarian diet.

From 2018 to 2019, Rodrigo dated her Bizaardvark co-star Ethan Wacker, whom she met in 2016 while filming the series. From 2023 to 2025, Rodrigo dated English actor Louis Partridge.

== Achievements ==
Rodrigo has received various music accolades, including three Grammy Awards, seven Billboard Music Awards, five MTV Video Music Awards, five iHeartRadio Music Awards, and four People's Choice Awards; an American Music Award, a Brit Award, and a Juno Award. She was named Time's Entertainer of the Year for 2021 and was placed on 100 Next list. Billboard honored her as Rookie of the Year for 2021 and Woman of the Year at the Billboard Women in Music event in 2022. The magazine included her on its annual 21 Under 21 list, which she topped the next year.

Rodrigo was included in the lists of Bloomberg 50, Forbes 30 Under 30 in the music category, Fortune's 40 Under 40 for two consecutive years, and Elle 100. Variety named her "Songwriter of the Year" for 2021 and "Storyteller of the Year" for 2023 at the Variety Hitmakers Ceremony. She was considered the top Songwriter of 2021 by the music rights platform Blokur and The Ivors Academy. American Society of Composers, Authors and Publishers (ASCAP) named her "Songwriter of the Year" at the ASCAP Pop Music Awards in 2022 and 2024. In 2024, Billboard included Rodrigo among the honorable mentions of its "25 Greatest Pop Stars of the 21st Century" listicle, calling her "a new-school rock star as much as a pop phenom", and Rolling Stone called her "Gen Z's preeminent rock star". In March 2025, Billboard ranked her 21st on its "Top 100 Women Artists of the 21st Century" list.

Rodrigo's debut album, Sour, was Spotify's most-streamed album in 2021 and is the most-streamed album by a female artist on the platform. Of the top five most-streamed songs of 2021, Sour's singles "Drivers License" and "Good 4 U" landed at numbers one and four, respectively. The former also broke the Spotify record (at the time) for the most-streamed non-holiday track in a single day and the biggest first week for a song. It also broke the record for the fastest song to hit 100 million streams.

== Discography ==
Studio albums

- Sour (2021)
- Guts (2023)
- You Seem Pretty Sad for a Girl So in Love (2026)

== Filmography ==
=== Film ===
Year	Title	Role	Notes	Ref.
2015	An American Girl: Grace Stirs Up Success	Grace Thomas	Direct-to-video film	
2021	Sour Prom	Herself	Concert film	
2022	Olivia Rodrigo: Driving Home 2 U	Herself	Documentary film	
2024	Olivia Rodrigo: Guts World Tour	Herself	Concert film	
2025	Lilith Fair: Building a Mystery	Herself	Documentary film	

=== Television ===
Year	Title	Role	Notes	Ref.
2016–2019	Bizaardvark	Paige Olvera	Main role	
2017	New Girl	Terrinea	Episode: "Young Adult"	
2019–2022	High School Musical: The Musical: The Series	Nini Salazar-Roberts	Main role (seasons 1–2); recurring role (season 3)	
2020	The Disney Family Singalong	Herself	Television special	
2020	High School Musical: The Musical: The Holiday Special	Herself / Nini Salazar-Roberts	Holiday special	
2021–2026	Saturday Night Live	Herself (musical guest / host)	3 episodes	
2025	Ladies & Gentlemen... 50 Years of SNL Music	Herself	Documentary special	

=== Video games ===
Year	Title	Role	Notes	Ref.
2026	Fortnite	Herself	Non-player character and player skin	

== Tours ==
- Sour Tour (2022)
- Guts World Tour (2024–2025)
- The Unraveled Tour (2026–2027)

== See also ==
- List of artists who reached number one in the United States
