= Lighthouse Management + Media =

American media company

- Type: Private
- Industry: Talent management, film production, television production
- Founded: 2016
- Founders: Aleen Keshishian
- Headquarters: Los Angeles, California, United States
- Key people: Aleen Keshishian (Founder, CEO); Zack Morgenroth (Partner, Talent Manager)

Lighthouse Management + Media, also referred to as Lighthouse Management & Media, is a full service American talent management, production, and media company based in Los Angeles, California. The firm represents a roster of prominent actors, directors, writers, and musicians. It also produces film and television content.

== History ==
In 2016, veteran talent manager Aleen Keshishian left Brillstein Entertainment Partners to found Lighthouse Management + Media, bringing with her a roster of high-profile clients including Jennifer Aniston, Selena Gomez, Jason Bateman, and Paul Rudd. Shortly thereafter, talent managers Zack Morgenroth and Margaret Riley also left Brillstein to join Lighthouse as partners.

In February 2022, Lighthouse expanded their presence in music by signing three-time Grammy winner Olivia Rodrigo. Two years later, Lighthouse signed R&B singer-songwriter and five-time Grammy winner H.E.R.

== Talent representation ==
Lighthouse is known for representing high-profile talent across film, television, theatre and music. Its client roster includes Academy Award-winning actors, Grammy-winning musicians, as well as other prominent writers, directors, and artists.

Notable clients currently include:

- Jennifer Aniston
- Selena Gomez
- Olivia Rodrigo
- Paul Rudd
- Jason Bateman
- Gwyneth Paltrow
- Mark Ruffalo
- Billy Crudup
- Laura Linney
- H.E.R.
- Petra Collins
- Kathyrn Hahn
- Emily Mortimer
- Justin Theroux
- Miranda Kerr
- Kiko Mizuhara

The company offers full-service management, career strategy, brand partnerships, and support across media platforms. Lighthouse has helped its clients launch ventures, including Selena Gomez's creation of Rare Beauty.

== Production ==
Lighthouse produces film and television projects through its production arm. It has partnered with major studios and streamers, including A24, Lionsgate Films, Apple TV+, Netflix, and HBO Max.

Lighthouse has also produced music videos, including Selena Gomez's "Bad Liar" and "Fetish" (feat. Gucci Mane).

=== Film and television ===
- Bombshell (2019) – biographical drama produced for Lionsgate Films
- Ratched (2020) – television series developed by Ryan Murphy that Lighthouse executive produced for Netflix
- Billie Eilish: The World's a Little Blurry (2021) – documentary produced for Apple TV+
- Selena Gomez: My Mind & Me (2022) – documentary produced for Apple TV+
- Louder: The Soundtrack of Change (2024) – documentary produced for HBO Max
- Olivia Rodrigo: GUTS World Tour (2024) – television special produced for Netflix

=== Upcoming productions ===
- Breakthrough – executive producing psychological thriller A24 film starring Dwayne Johnson
