= Aleen Keshishian =

American talent manager and film producer

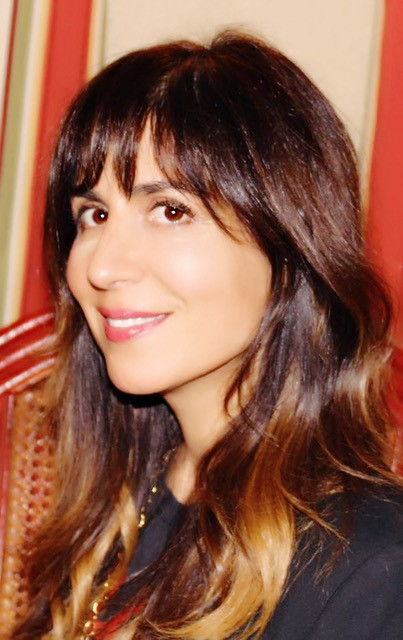
- Born: Aleen Nicole Keshishian; February 3, 1968 (age 58); Beirut, Lebanon
- Education: St. Paul's School; Harvard University (AB)
- Occupations: Talent manager, producer
- Title: Founder and CEO, Lighthouse Management + Media

Aleen Nicole Keshishian (born February 3, 1968) is a talent manager, producer, and founder and CEO of Lighthouse Management + Media. She manages the careers of artists including Jennifer Aniston, Selena Gomez, Olivia Rodrigo, Paul Rudd, Jason Bateman, Mark Ruffalo, Billy Crudup, Laura Linney and Gwyneth Paltrow.

Her producing credits include documentaries Billie Eilish: The World's a Little Blurry and Selena Gomez: My Mind & Me, as well as the Ryan Murphy series Ratched. Keshishian has led and negotiated the sale of films and TV shows.

Keshishian has been named one of the most powerful women in Hollywood by The Hollywood Reporter's Power 100 ten times in her career. In 2023, she was named in Variety500's list of influential business leaders in the global media industry.

== Early life and education ==
Keshishian was born in Beirut, Lebanon, to Cecile Keshishian (née Simonian), and Kevork Keshishian, a pediatrician and radiologist from Aleppo, Syria. Both Cecile and Kevork were born to and raised by survivors of the Armenian genocide. Cecile and Kevork immigrated to the United States in 1968, living for a brief period in Brookline, Massachusetts, before settling in Manchester, New Hampshire, where they raised Aleen and her older brother, Alek, who is a film director. Growing up, both children were taught to read, write, and speak fluently in Armenian. Keshishian grew up acting at the Manchester children's theater alongside Adam Sandler.

Keshishian attended St. Paul's School in Concord, New Hampshire, before graduating magna cum laude from Harvard College in 1990 with a degree in art history.

== Career ==
=== Casting and ICM ===
Keshishian got her start in entertainment as a casting assistant to Juliet Taylor. In 1993, after three years in casting, Keshishian was hired as a talent agent at ICM in New York City by Sam Cohn. She spent six years under his tutelage and cites him as a mentor. Keshishian's first client as an agent was 12-year-old Natalie Portman, who was signed by Keshishian before she starred in Luc Besson's The Professional. Keshishian managed Portman for 21 years. During this time, Keshishian orchestrated the collaboration between her former Harvard classmate Darren Aronofsky and Portman on the 2010 film Black Swan, which earned Portman an Academy Award for Best Actress.

=== AMG and Brillstein Entertainment Partners ===
In 1999, after six years at ICM, Keshishian moved to Los Angeles to become a talent manager and co-run the motion picture talent department at Artists Management Group (AMG). In 2005, Keshishian left AMG to join Brillstein Entertainment Partners as a partner. At Brillstein, Keshishian began working with Jennifer Aniston and Gwyneth Paltrow, who has referred to Keshishian as "a very special and unique force in the talent management world."

=== Lighthouse Management + Media ===
In 2016, she left Brillstein and founded Lighthouse Management + Media, a full service talent management, production, and media company based in Los Angeles. Keshishian is both the owner and CEO of the company.

Keshishian helped Jason Bateman with his directing career while simultaneously building out his production company, Aggregate Films. She has also helped place Gwyneth Paltrow, Mark Ruffalo, Paul Rudd, Natalie Portman, Zoe Saldaña, and Kathryn Hahn in the Marvel Cinematic Universe. Among her other clients are actors Billy Crudup, Laura Linney, Topher Grace, Justin Theroux, Emily Mortimer, director Jesse Peretz, supermodel Miranda Kerr, and former United States Ambassador and producer Nicole Avant.

In 2014, Keshishian expanded her management portfolio into music, signing Selena Gomez in all areas of her career to assist her transition from child actress. Keshishian has guided Gomez's career as an actor, musician, entrepreneur, and social media presence. Keshishian has also worked with Gomez to create and develop the cosmetics company Rare Beauty.

In 2022, Keshishian signed singer-songwriter Olivia Rodrigo. In 2024, Keshishian signed singer-songwriter H.E.R. Later that year, Keshishian produced the Olivia Rodrigo: GUTS World Tour concert special with Netflix. She also produced the Max Original music documentary Louder: The Soundtrack of Change alongside Selena Gomez and Stacey Abrams. The documentary tells the story of female music icons whose songs and activism have inspired the fight for gender equality.

== Philanthropy ==
Alongside Selena Gomez, Keshishian helped establish the Rare Impact Fund, an initiative led by mental health experts committed to raising funds for mental health treatments in underserved communities. To date, the Rare Impact Fund has raised $13 million dollars. Keshishian and her clients have raised money for other charities including UNICEF, Make-A-Wish, St. Jude's, the Children's Hospital of LA, Global Citizen, the Lupus Alliance, and The Solutions Project.

== Personal life ==
Keshishian serves on the board of directors of the Center for Countering Digital Hate. She has also served as a John H. Mitchell visiting professor in media entertainment at the USC School of Cinematic Arts.

Keshishian is married to her Harvard classmate Kit Troyer, with whom she has two children. They live in Los Angeles.

== Filmography ==
=== Film ===
Year	Film	Credit
2004	Haven	Executive producer
2010	Hesher	Executive producer
2011	Our Idiot Brother	Executive producer
2013	Life of Crime	Executive producer
2015	Jane Got a Gun	Producer
2016	Pride and Prejudice and Zombies	Executive producer
2021	Billie Eilish: The World's a Little Blurry	Executive producer
2022	Selena Gomez: My Mind & Me	Producer
2024	Louder: The Soundtrack of Change	Producer

=== Television ===
Year	Film	Credit
2005	Freddie	Producer
2020	Ratched	Executive producer

=== Other ===
Year	Category	Title	Credit
2017	Music video	Selena Gomez: "Bad Liar"	Producer
2017	Music video	Selena Gomez Ft. Gucci Mane: "Fetish"	Producer
2024	TV Special	Olivia Rodrigo: GUTS World Tour	Producer
