= 9th AACTA International Awards =

Australian film and TV awards ceremony in 2020

- Date: 3 January 2020
- Site: Mondrian Hotel; Los Angeles, California, U.S.

Highlights
- Best Film: Parasite
- Most awards: Once Upon a Time in Hollywood (2)
- Most nominations: The Irishman (6)

The 9th Australian Academy of Cinema and Television Arts International Awards (commonly known as the AACTA International Awards) is presented by the Australian Academy of Cinema and Television Arts (AACTA), a non-profit organisation whose aim is to identify, award, promote and celebrate Australia's greatest achievements in film and television. Awards were handed out for the best films of 2019 regardless of the country of origin, and are the international counterpart to the awards for Australian films.

The awards were handed out on 3 January 2020.

== Winners and nominees ==
Best Film: Parasite; The Irishman; Joker; The King; Once Upon a Time in Hollywood	Best Direction: Quentin Tarantino – Once Upon a Time in Hollywood; Sam Mendes – 1917; Martin Scorsese – The Irishman; Todd Phillips – Joker; Bong Joon-ho – Parasite
Best Actor: Adam Driver – Marriage Story as Charlie Barber; Christian Bale – Ford v Ferrari as Ken Miles; Antonio Banderas – Pain and Glory as Salvador Mallo; Robert De Niro – The Irishman as Frank Sheeran; Joaquin Phoenix – Joker as Arthur Fleck / Joker	Best Actress: Saoirse Ronan – Little Women as Josephine "Jo" March; Awkwafina – The Farewell as Billi Wang; Scarlett Johansson – Marriage Story as Nicole Barber; Charlize Theron – Bombshell as Megyn Kelly; Renée Zellweger – Judy as Judy Garland
Best Supporting Actor: Brad Pitt – Once Upon a Time in Hollywood as Cliff Booth; John Lithgow – Bombshell as Roger Ailes; Al Pacino – The Irishman as Jimmy Hoffa; Joe Pesci – The Irishman as Russell Bufalino; Song Kang-ho – Parasite as Kim Ki-taek	Best Supporting Actress: Margot Robbie – Bombshell as Kayla Pospisil; Toni Collette – Knives Out as Joni Thrombey; Nicole Kidman – Bombshell as Gretchen Carlson; Florence Pugh – Little Women as Amy March; Margot Robbie – Once Upon a Time in Hollywood as Sharon Tate
Best Screenplay: Taika Waititi – Jojo Rabbit; Steven Zaillian – The Irishman; Todd Phillips, Scott Silver – Joker; Quentin Tarantino – Once Upon a Time in Hollywood; Bong Joon-ho, Han Jin-won – Parasite

=== Films with multiple nominations and awards ===
Films that received multiple nominations
Nominations	Film
6	The Irishman
5	Once Upon a Time in Hollywood
4	Parasite
4	Bombshell
4	Joker
2	Little Women
2	Marriage Story

Films that received multiple awards
Awards	Film
2	Once Upon a Time in Hollywood
