= Olivia Rodrigo: Driving Home 2 U =

Musical Documentary

- Official poster
- Directed by: Stacey Lee
- Based on: Sour by Olivia Rodrigo
- Produced by: Michelle An; John Janick; David D. Moore; Jason Sterman
- Starring: Olivia Rodrigo; Dan Nigro
- Cinematography: Zoe Simone Yi
- Edited by: Nia Imani
- Music by: Scott Michael Smith
- Production companies: Interscope Films; Supper Club
- Distributed by: Disney+
- Release date: March 25, 2022
- Running time: 76 minutes
- Country: United States
- Language: English

Olivia Rodrigo: Driving Home 2 U (stylized in all lowercase and subtitled A Sour Film) is a 2022 American documentary directed by Stacey Lee, released to Disney+ on March 25, 2022. Based on the making of Olivia Rodrigo's debut album, Sour, the documentary is about a road trip Rodrigo took between Salt Lake City and Los Angeles along with her live band, where they performed songs from Sour on different spots along the trip. The documentary also contains clips of Rodrigo and Sour producer Dan Nigro, as well as interviews where Rodrigo explains the meaning behind songs from the album. The documentary won "Best Music Documentary" at the 2022 MTV Movie & TV Awards and was nominated for "Best Longform Video" at the 2022 MTV Video Music Awards.

== Synopsis ==
The official synopsis released to Disney+ states "Grammy nominated singer-songwriter Olivia Rodrigo takes a familiar road trip from Salt Lake City, where she began writing her debut album Sour, to Los Angeles. Along the way, Rodrigo recounts the memories of writing and creating her record-breaking debut album and shares her feelings as a young woman navigating a specific time in her life. Through new live arrangements of her songs, intimate interviews and never-before-seen footage from the making of the album, audiences will follow Olivia along on a cinematic journey exploring the story of Sour. Olivia Rodrigo: Driving Home 2 U is a Disney+ original film from Disney Branded Television, directed by Stacey Lee and produced by Interscope Films and Supper Club."

== Production ==
Rodrigo and Dan Nigro installed a GoPro camera in Nigro's home studio, shortly after the success of "Drivers License", in order to capture them "picking apart arrangements, lyrics, and song order as it gets down to the wire."

== Release and promotion ==
Olivia Rodrigo: Driving Home 2 U was announced via Rodrigo's social media profiles on February 17, 2022. A teaser trailer for the film was released on the same day. The film was released to Disney+ on March 25, 2022, and to Hulu on May 1, 2022. On the 21st of March, a new arrangement of jealousy, jealousy from Driving Home 2 U was released by Disney Plus. The film had one television airing on May 1, 2022, on Freeform in the United States.

== Reception ==
=== Audience viewership ===
According to Whip Media's TV Time, Olivia Rodrigo: Driving Home 2 U was the 10th most streamed movie across all platforms in the United States during the week of March 25 to March 27, 2022.

=== Critical reception ===
On Metacritic, which assigns a normalized score out of 100 to ratings from publications, Driving Home 2 U received an average score of 66 based on four reviews, indicating "generally favorable reviews".

Chris Azzopardi wrote in The New York Times that "the more Lee shows Rodrigo gazing into the distance, whether alone in a hotel room or atop a hill, the more it feels like a director's cue rather than an organic moment that the camera just happened to catch" and "In the scenes where Rodrigo is openly sharing parts of her life that led to creating Sour, authenticity seems to come more easily", but that "It's a film that at least succeeds in making you feel that it really is about the journey, not the destination." Owen Gleiberman of Variety calls Driving Home 2 U a "decently baked slice of fan service that still seems like it might be arriving a little too soon," while stating that the film is a "snapshot of a broken romantic moment" that provides "all-too-real emotions of adolescence."

In a four-out-of-five star review, NME's Hannah Mylrea called the film "gorgeously shot, with stunning drone footage showing off the road trip scenery, and carefully curated locations for each of the performances" and "an honest look under the hood of Sour, as well as the past year of Rodrigo's life", proclaiming that "if this is chapter one of Rodrigo's story, it'll be fascinating to see what comes next." In a 7/10 review, Paste's Sydney Urbanek called the song performances "the film's biggest highlight, the songs having been given entirely new arrangements for the occasion", highlighting the "supercharged take on the usually mellow 'Jealousy, Jealousy'" and the "beautiful (if somewhat less cathartic) string arrangement" added to "Good 4 U." Jennifer Green of Common Sense Media reviewed the film three out of five stars and said that Driving Home 2 U "is meant to inspire interest in her album and in her as a performer. She is front-woman to an all-female band and was a successful child actor. She comes across as genuine and grounded."

=== Accolades ===
List of awards and nominations for Olivia Rodrigo: Driving Home 2 U
Year	Award	Category	Nominee(s) and recipient(s)	Result	Ref.
2022	Hollywood Critics Association TV Awards	Best Streaming Documentary Television Movie	Olivia Rodrigo: Driving Home 2 U	Nominated	
2022	MTV Movie & TV Awards	Best Music Documentary	Olivia Rodrigo	Won	
2022	MTV Video Music Awards	Best Longform Video	Olivia Rodrigo	Nominated	
