= Shelly Westerman =

American television and film editor

- Occupations: Editor, producer
- Years active: 1998–present

Shelly Westerman is an American television and film editor. She is best known for her work on Only Murders in the Building, Halston, Ratched, American Crime Story.

Westerman is a member of American Cinema Editors, and has previously served as an editing thesis mentor at the AFI Conservatory.

== Selected filmography ==
Year	Title	Contribution	Note
2022–2024	Only Murders in the Building	Editor and co-producer	12 episodes
2021	Halston	Editor and producer	5 episodes
2020	Ratched	Editor	4 episodes
2019	The Politician	Editor	3 episodes
2018–2019	Pose	Editor	4 episodes
2018	The Assassination of Gianni Versace: American Crime Story	Editor	3 episodes
2017	Time After Time	Editor	3 episodes
2017	Feud: Bette and Joan	Editor	2 episodes
2016–2019	American Horror Story	Editor	2 episodes
2016	Cooper Barrett's Guide to Surviving Life	Editor	6 episodes
2015	The Wedding Ringer	Editor	Feature film
2014	About Last Night	Editor	Feature film

== Awards and nominations ==
Year	Result	Award	Category	Work	Ref.
2024	Nominated	Primetime Emmy Awards	Outstanding Picture Editing for a Single-Camera Comedy Series	Only Murders in the Building : "Sitzprobe"	
2024	Nominated	American Cinema Editors Awards	Best Edited Single-Camera Comedy Series	Only Murders in the Building : "Sitzprobe"	
2023	Nominated	American Cinema Editors Awards	Best Edited Single-Camera Comedy Series	Only Murders in the Building : "I Know Who Did It"	
2023	Nominated	BFE Cut Above Awards	Best Edited Series Comedy	Only Murders in the Building	
2018	Nominated	Primetime Emmy Awards	Outstanding Picture Editing for a Limited or Anthology Series or Movie	American Crime Story : "House by the Lake"	
