= Bombshell (2019 film) =

2019 film directed by Jay Roach

- Theatrical release poster
- Directed by: Jay Roach
- Written by: Charles Randolph
- Produced by: Aaron L. Glibert; Jay Roach; Robert Graf; Michelle Graham; Charles Randolph; Margaret Riley; Charlize Theron; A. J. Dix; Beth Kono
- Starring: Charlize Theron; Nicole Kidman; John Lithgow; Kate McKinnon; Connie Britton; Malcolm McDowell; Allison Janney; Margot Robbie
- Cinematography: Barry Ackroyd
- Edited by: Jon Poll
- Music by: Theodore Shapiro
- Production companies: Bron Studios; Annapurna Pictures; Denver and Delilah Productions; Gramsci; Lighthouse Management + Media; Creative Wealth Media
- Distributed by: Lionsgate
- Release date: December 13, 2019 (United States)
- Running time: 109 minutes
- Countries: United States; Canada
- Language: English
- Budget: $32 million
- Box office: $61.4 million

Bombshell is a 2019 biographical drama film directed by Jay Roach and written by Charles Randolph. The film stars Charlize Theron, Nicole Kidman, and Margot Robbie, and is based on the accounts of the women at Fox News who set out to expose CEO Roger Ailes for sexual harassment. John Lithgow, Kate McKinnon, Connie Britton, Malcolm McDowell, and Allison Janney appear in supporting roles.

Bombshell was released by Lionsgate on December 13, 2019. The film grossed $61.4 million against a $32 million budget and received mostly positive reviews. It garnered praise for its acting as well as its choices of makeup and hair, which won the Academy Award for Best Makeup and Hairstyling, while earning some criticism of the screenplay and inaccuracies in the plot and character portrayals.

== Plot ==
After co-moderating the 2016 Republican debate, Megyn Kelly faces numerous insults from Donald Trump, who is angry because she asked him about his offensive misogynistic comments. Under pressure from the network, and after receiving death threats and unwanted paparazzi attention, Kelly eventually reconciles with Trump.

Meanwhile, Gretchen Carlson is removed as co-anchor of the popular Fox & Friends show, and transferred to a less popular show. Inundated by sexist comments on and off the air, including by Roger Ailes, Carlson meets with lawyers, Nancy Smith, and Neil Mullin, who explain that her contract prevents her from suing the network, but she can sue Ailes personally.

On her first day on The O'Reilly Factor, Kayla Pospisil meets fellow female staffer Jess Carr, and they start a relationship. The next day, Ailes begins sexually harassing Pospisil. She begins to tell Carr about what happened, but is warned not to get involved because it could jeopardize their own relationship.

Carlson is later fired, ostensibly for her on-air support of the federal assault weapons ban, so she decides to sue Ailes. When the news breaks the next day, Ailes denies the allegations, and Kelly reveals to her core team that he sexually harassed her when she started at Fox. In the following weeks, despite a number of other women voicing their public support against Ailes, Kelly conspicuously refuses to make a comment on Carlson's accusations.

After more women accuse Ailes, Kelly starts to find other women at the network. She visits Pospisil, and they confide in each other. Kelly encourages her to come forward, and after consulting with Carr, she does, and their relationship remains intact. Through her attorneys, Carlson later informs Ailes she has recorded conversations to support her claims, deliberately withholding them from Ailes's lawyers in order to undermine his credibility.

Defeated, Ailes is fired by Fox co-creator Rupert Murdoch. He later settles Carlson's lawsuit for $20 million with an apology from Fox, but the settlement contains a non-disclosure agreement. Fox eventually pays the victims of sexual harassment $50 million, while paying Ailes and O'Reilly $65 million in severance.

== Cast ==
- Charlize Theron as Megyn Kelly
- Nicole Kidman as Gretchen Carlson
- Margot Robbie as Kayla Pospisil (composite character)
- John Lithgow as Roger Ailes
- Kate McKinnon as Jess Carr
- Connie Britton as Beth Ailes
- Malcolm McDowell as Rupert Murdoch
- Allison Janney as Susan Estrich
- Rob Delaney as Gil Norman
- Mark Duplass as Douglas Brunt
- Liv Hewson as Lily Balin
- Jack Haven (Note: Credited as Brigette Lundy-Paine) as Julia Clarke
- Richard Kind as Rudy Giuliani
- Stephen Root as Neil Mullin
- Robin Weigert as Nancy Smith
- Mark Moses as Bill Shine
- Holland Taylor as Faye
- Brooke Smith as Irena Brighanti
- Ben Lawson as Lachlan Murdoch
- Josh Lawson as James Murdoch
- Alanna Ubach as Jeanine Pirro
- Bree Condon as Kimberly Guilfoyle
- Kevin Dorff as Bill O'Reilly
- Michael Buie as Bret Baier
- Marc Evan Jackson as Chris Wallace
- Anne Ramsay as Greta Van Susteren
- Tricia Helfer as Alisyn Camerota
- Jennifer Morrison as Juliet Huddy
- Ashley Greene as Abby Huntsman
- Ahna O'Reilly as Julie Roginsky
- Lisa Canning as Harris Faulkner
- Elisabeth Röhm as Martha MacCallum
- Alice Eve as Ainsley Earhardt
- P. J. Byrne as Neil Cavuto
- Tony Plana as Geraldo Rivera
- Nazanin Boniadi as Rudi Bakhtiar

== Production ==
=== Development ===
On May 18, 2017, shortly after the death of Fox News founder Roger Ailes, it was announced that Annapurna Pictures was in the early stages of developing a film centered on the allegations made against Ailes by female employees, including Megyn Kelly and Gretchen Carlson. Charles Randolph was expected to write the film's screenplay. On May 22, 2018, it was announced that Jay Roach had been hired to direct the film. On August 1, 2018, it was announced that Roach, Randolph, Beth Kono, A. J. Dix, and Margaret Riley would act as the film's producers and that Denver and Delilah Productions would serve as the film's production company. On October 9, 2018, it was announced that Annapurna Pictures had dropped out of producing the film, reportedly due to concerns over the film's growing budget. At the time of the announcement, it was confirmed that Bron Studios was staying on and that producers were looking at Focus Features, Participant Media, and Amblin Entertainment to help finance the film. The following week, Lionsgate began negotiating to join the production after Focus Features and Amblin Entertainment passed on the project. By the end of the month, Lionsgate was reported to be closing a deal to distribute the film. In December 2018, it was reported that Theodore Shapiro would compose the film's score and that Barry Ackroyd would serve as the film's cinematographer. The film was given the working title Fair and Balanced, before being announced as Bombshell in August 2019. Kelly later stated that she had no involvement with the film.

=== Casting ===
Alongside the directing and writing announcements, it was reported that Charlize Theron had entered negotiations to portray Kelly in the film. On August 1, 2018, it was reported that Nicole Kidman had begun negotiations to star as Carlson and that Margot Robbie was in talks to play a composite associate producer at the network, with Theron confirmed to star. Later that month, it was announced that John Lithgow had been cast as Roger Ailes. In September 2018, it was reported that Allison Janney had been cast as lawyer Susan Estrich and that Kate McKinnon had been cast to play a fictional producer.

In October 2018, it was announced that Malcolm McDowell, Mark Duplass, and Alice Eve had been cast as Rupert Murdoch, Douglas Brunt, and Ainsley Earhardt, respectively. In November 2018, it was reported that Brigette Lundy-Paine and Liv Hewson had been cast as two fictional characters and that Alanna Ubach, Elisabeth Röhm, Spencer Garrett, Connie Britton, Ashley Greene, Brooke Smith, Michael Buie, Nazanin Boniadi, and Bree Condon had been cast as Jeanine Pirro, Martha MacCallum, Sean Hannity, Beth Ailes, Abby Huntsman, Irena Brigante, Bret Baier, Rudi Bakhtiar, and Kimberly Guilfoyle, respectively. In December 2018, it was announced that Rob Delaney had joined the cast of the film in an undisclosed role and that Ahna O'Reilly had been cast as Julie Roginsky. In June 2019, Robin Weigert announced she had joined the cast of the film.

=== Filming ===
Principal photography for the film began on October 22, 2018, in Los Angeles, California.

== Release ==
The film was scheduled for release on December 20, 2019. However, it was pushed up to December 13, 2019, in a limited release, opening to public viewing on December 20.

== Reception ==
=== Box office ===
Bombshell grossed $31.8 million in the United States and Canada, and $29.6 million in other territories, for a worldwide total of $61.4 million.

In its limited opening weekend, the film made $312,100 from four theaters for a per-venue average of $78,025, the fifth best of 2019. The film went wide at 1,480 theaters the following weekend and, despite being projected to gross around $10 million, finished sixth with $5.1 million. The audience was 58% female, with 60% being between 18 and 34 years old. The following weekend the film made $4.7 million (a total of $8.3 million over the five-day Christmas frame), falling to ninth. The film's box office results were seen as a disappointment, with The Hill saying that the presence of other projects about Ailes, such as the documentary Divide and Conquer: The Story of Roger Ailes and the Showtime series The Loudest Voice, had lowered the demand for a film on the subject. Forbes also noted that audiences likely do not want to "shell out movie theater money and time to watch a film about women being treated terribly by powerful men... especially (generally speaking) women".

=== Critical response ===
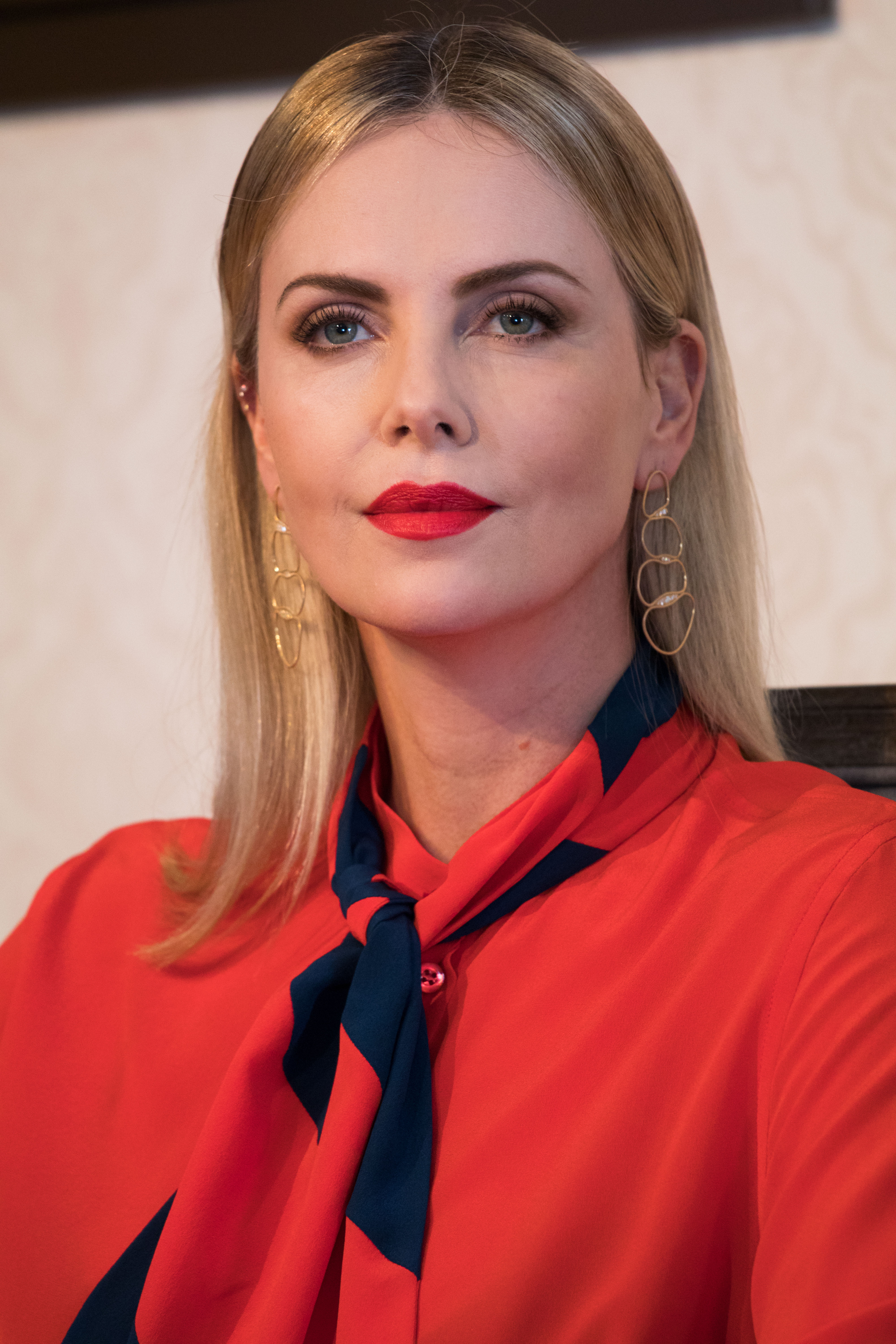
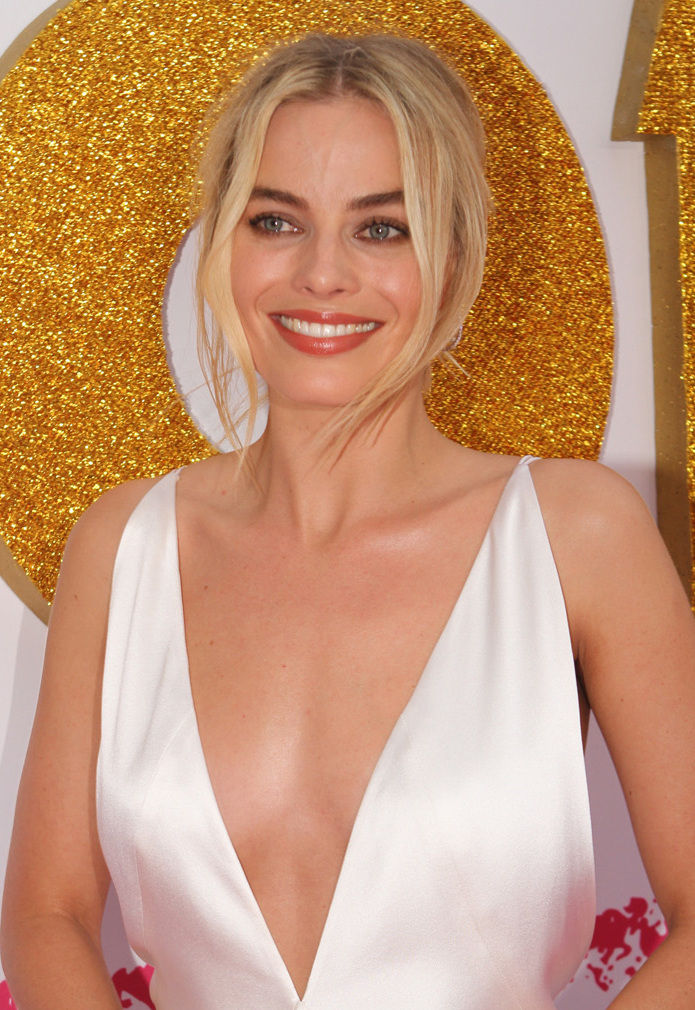
The performances of Charlize Theron and Margot Robbie received critical acclaim, earning them Academy Award nominations for Best Actress and Best Supporting Actress respectively.

On Rotten Tomatoes, the film has an approval rating of 68% based on 348 reviews, with an average rating of 6.6/10. The website's critics consensus reads: "Bombshell benefits from a terrific cast and a worthy subject, but its impact is muffled by a frustrating inability to go deeper than the sensationalistic surface." On Metacritic, the film has a weighted average score of 64 out of 100, based on reviews from 46 critics, indicating "generally favorable" reviews. Audiences polled by PostTrak gave the film an average 4 out of 5 stars, with 70% saying they would definitely recommend it.

Variety's Owen Gleiberman gave the film a positive review and wrote: "Bombshell is a scalding and powerful movie about what selling, in America, has become. The film is about selling sex, selling a candidate, selling yourself, selling the truth. And about how at Fox News all those things came together." Todd McCarthy of The Hollywood Reporter wrote: "The actors throw themselves into their roles with terrific zeal, enlivened by the often blunt dialogue and the issues at stake." Kevin Maher of The Times gave the film 4/5 stars, describing it as "a timely satirical takedown that finds black humour and absurdist comedy in the subject of workplace sexual harassment while never losing sight of its devastating repercussions." Ann Hornaday of The Washington Post gave the film 3/4 stars, calling it "an absorbing, well-crafted chronicle of the sexual harassment accusations that forced Fox News founding CEO Roger Ailes to resign in disgrace."

Moira Macdonald of The Seattle Times gave the film 2/4 stars, writing that it "went wrong"; much of it due to Charles Randolph's "cutesy screenplay ... which unfolds at a cartoony pace more suitable to a dark comedy." Simran Hans of The Observer gave the film 2/5 stars, writing: "What happened to these women is appalling; that the film takes such pains to sand down the politics of its central characters to make them more sympathetic undermines its entire thesis. Kelly's racist attitudes are smoothed over, while Carlson's homophobia is conveniently erased." Hans went on to argue that the film would have been more complete had it engaged with the "tension" between what Hans claimed were its protagonists' dual roles as perpetuators of sexism themselves, owing to their status as conservative icons as well as women harmed by a deeply sexist organization; and that by presenting the protagonists simply as sympathetic characters the film failed to make sufficient criticism of these women and their role as cogs in an organization which, in her view, espouses rightwing ideology. Linda Holmes of NPR wrote: "It has a few strong moments, mostly courtesy of Robbie, but it's both underwhelming and overworked, inelegantly structured and missing something fundamental at the core." Joe Morgenstern of The Wall Street Journal said that the film was "a movie with a compelling story to tell turns into a blunt-force polemic that can't stop hammering its message home."

=== Reactions from the depicted ===
In January 2020, Kelly posted a 30-minute video on her YouTube channel of a roundtable discussion, including her, Huddy, Bakhtiar, Brunt and former Fox News producer Julie Zann and their reactions and opinions after viewing a screening of the film. The panel confirmed many details depicted, including having to do the "spin" to show off their bodies to Ailes in private; Zann tearfully noted that reality was "worse than that" and the filmmakers "let Roger off easy". Kelly took particular issue with the scene where Robbie's character blames Kelly for not speaking up, calling the scene victim blaming and noting that the scene was "written by a man"; however, she also noted that the scene belongs in the film as a reminder to herself that she could have done more to help other victims. She also felt the film "took liberties" with her story and specifically denied that she told Murdoch the question she was going to ask Donald Trump in advance of the debate or that Ailes liked the question. "The notion that Roger liked the Donald Trump 'woman' question because it created controversy and a TV moment was not true. Roger did not like the question — at all — and was very angry at me for asking it. At one point [he] actually said to me, 'No more female empowerment stuff!'."

== Accolades ==
At the 92nd Academy Awards, it earned three nominations: Best Actress (Theron), Best Supporting Actress (Robbie), and Best Makeup and Hairstyling, winning the latter. The film also received two nominations at the 77th Golden Globe Awards (for Theron and Robbie), four at the 26th Screen Actors Guild Awards (Theron, Robbie, and Kidman, as well as Outstanding Performance by a Cast in a Motion Picture) and three at the 73rd British Academy Film Awards (Theron, Robbie, and Best Makeup and Hair). The theme song, "One Little Soldier", performed by Regina Spektor, won the 2020 "Best Song Written or Recorded for a Film" from the Guild of Music Supervisors Awards.

Award	Date of ceremony	Category	Recipients	Result	Ref.
AACTA Awards	January 3, 2020	Best International Actress	Charlize Theron	Nominated	
AACTA Awards	January 3, 2020	Best International Supporting Actor	John Lithgow	Nominated	
AACTA Awards	January 3, 2020	Best International Supporting Actress	Nicole Kidman	Nominated	
AACTA Awards	January 3, 2020	Best International Supporting Actress	Margot Robbie	Won	
AARP's Movies for Grownups Awards	January 11, 2020	Best Movie for Grownups	Bombshell	Nominated	
AARP's Movies for Grownups Awards	January 11, 2020	Readers' Choice	Bombshell	Nominated	
AARP's Movies for Grownups Awards	January 11, 2020	Best Supporting Actress	Nicole Kidman	Nominated	
AARP's Movies for Grownups Awards	January 11, 2020	Best Ensemble	Bombshell	Nominated	
Academy Awards	February 9, 2020	Best Actress	Charlize Theron	Nominated	
Academy Awards	February 9, 2020	Best Supporting Actress	Margot Robbie	Nominated	
Academy Awards	February 9, 2020	Best Makeup and Hairstyling	Kazu Hiro, Anne Morgan and Vivian Baker	Won	
British Academy Film Awards	February 2, 2020	Best Actress in a Leading Role	Charlize Theron	Nominated	
British Academy Film Awards	February 2, 2020	Best Actress in a Supporting Role	Margot Robbie	Nominated	
British Academy Film Awards	February 2, 2020	Best Makeup and Hair	Vivian Baker, Kazu Hiro and Anne Morgan	Won	
Critics' Choice Movie Awards	January 12, 2020	Best Actress	Charlize Theron	Nominated	
Critics' Choice Movie Awards	January 12, 2020	Best Supporting Actress	Margot Robbie	Nominated	
Critics' Choice Movie Awards	January 12, 2020	Best Acting Ensemble	Bombshell	Nominated	
Critics' Choice Movie Awards	January 12, 2020	Best Makeup	Vivian Baker, Cristina Waltz and Richard Redlefsen	Won	
Dallas–Fort Worth Film Critics Association	December 16, 2019	Best Actress	Charlize Theron	3rd Place	
Dallas–Fort Worth Film Critics Association	December 16, 2019	Best Supporting Actress	Margot Robbie	2nd Place	
Detroit Film Critics Society	December 9, 2019	Best Actress	Charlize Theron	Nominated	
Dorian Awards	January 8, 2020	Supporting Film Performance of the Year — Actress	Margot Robbie	Nominated	
Florida Film Critics Circle	December 23, 2019	Best Actress	Charlize Theron	Nominated	
Florida Film Critics Circle	December 23, 2019	Best Supporting Actor	John Lithgow	Runner-up	
Florida Film Critics Circle	December 23, 2019	Best Supporting Actress	Margot Robbie	Runner-up	
GLAAD Media Awards	March 19, 2020	Outstanding Film – Wide Release	Bombshell	Nominated	
Golden Globe Awards	January 5, 2020	Best Actress – Motion Picture Drama	Charlize Theron	Nominated	
Golden Globe Awards	January 5, 2020	Best Supporting Actress – Motion Picture	Margot Robbie	Nominated	
Heartland Film Festival	October 10–20, 2019	Truly Moving Picture Award	Bombshell	Won	
Hollywood Critics Association	January 9, 2020	Best Actress	Charlize Theron	Nominated	
Hollywood Critics Association	January 9, 2020	Best Hair and Makeup	Kazu Hiro, Anne Morgan and Vivian Baker	Won	
Houston Film Critics Society	January 2, 2020	Best Actress	Charlize Theron	Nominated	
Houston Film Critics Society	January 2, 2020	Best Supporting Actress	Margot Robbie	Nominated	
London Film Critics' Circle	January 30, 2020	Actress of the Year	Charlize Theron	Nominated	
London Film Critics' Circle	January 30, 2020	Supporting Actress of the Year	Margot Robbie	Nominated	
Make-Up Artists and Hair Stylists Guild Awards	January 11, 2020	Best Contemporary Make-Up	Vivian Baker, Cristina Waltz and Richard Redlefsen	Won	
Make-Up Artists and Hair Stylists Guild Awards	January 11, 2020	Best Special Make-Up Effects	Vivian Baker, Richard Redlefsen and Kazu Hiro	Won	
Make-Up Artists and Hair Stylists Guild Awards	January 11, 2020	Best Contemporary Hair Styling	Anne Morgan, Jaime Leigh McIntosh and Adruitha Lee	Won	
Palm Springs International Film Festival	January 2, 2020	International Star Award, Actress	Charlize Theron	Won	
San Francisco Bay Area Film Critics Circle	December 16, 2019	Best Actress	Charlize Theron	Nominated	
San Francisco Bay Area Film Critics Circle	December 16, 2019	Best Supporting Actress	Margot Robbie	Nominated	
Satellite Awards	December 19, 2019	Best Motion Picture – Drama	Bombshell	Nominated	
Satellite Awards	December 19, 2019	Best Actress – Drama	Charlize Theron	Nominated	
Satellite Awards	December 19, 2019	Best Supporting Actress	Nicole Kidman	Nominated	
Satellite Awards	December 19, 2019	Best Supporting Actress	Margot Robbie	Nominated	
Screen Actors Guild Awards	January 19, 2020	Outstanding Performance by a Cast in a Motion Picture	Bombshell	Nominated	
Screen Actors Guild Awards	January 19, 2020	Outstanding Performance by a Female Actor in a Leading Role	Charlize Theron	Nominated	
Screen Actors Guild Awards	January 19, 2020	Outstanding Performance by a Female Actor in a Supporting Role	Nicole Kidman	Nominated	
Screen Actors Guild Awards	January 19, 2020	Outstanding Performance by a Female Actor in a Supporting Role	Margot Robbie	Nominated	
St. Louis Film Critics Association	December 15, 2019	Best Actress	Charlize Theron	Nominated	
St. Louis Film Critics Association	December 15, 2019	Best Supporting Actress	Margot Robbie	Won	
Women Film Critics Circle	December 9, 2019	Best Movie About Women	Bombshell	Nominated	
Women Film Critics Circle	December 9, 2019	Adrienne Shelly Award	Bombshell	Won	
Women Film Critics Circle	December 9, 2019	Best Female Action Heroes	The Women of Bombshell	Nominated	

== See also ==
- New Yorkers in journalism
- The Loudest Voice (2019) – A miniseries based on the life of Roger Ailes, which also depicts the events leading up to his departure from Fox News.
