= Ratched (TV series) =

2020 American drama streaming television series

- Genre: Drama; Psychological thriller
- Created by: Evan Romansky
- Based on: The character of Nurse Ratched from One Flew Over the Cuckoo's Nest by Ken Kesey
- Developed by: Ryan Murphy
- Starring: Sarah Paulson; Finn Wittrock; Cynthia Nixon; Jon Jon Briones; Charlie Carver; Judy Davis; Sharon Stone
- Opening theme: "Danse Macabre, op. 40" by Camille Saint-Saëns
- Composer: Mac Quayle
- Country of origin: United States
- Original language: English
- No. of seasons: 1
- No. of episodes: 8

Production
- Executive producers: Aleen Keshishian; Margaret Riley; Jacob Epstein; Michael Douglas; Robert Mitas; Jennifer Salt; Sarah Paulson; Ian Brennan; Tim Minear; Alexis Martin Woodall; Ryan Murphy
- Producers: Paul Zaentz; Todd Nenninger; Eric Kovtun; Lou Eyrich; Eryn Krueger Mekash; Sara Stelwagen; Tanase Popa
- Cinematography: Nelson Cragg; Blake McClure; Andrew Mitchell; Simon Dennis
- Editors: Shelly Westerman; Peggy Tachdjian; Ravi Subramanian; Ken Ramos; Danielle Wang
- Running time: 45–62 minutes
- Production companies: Furthur Films; Lighthouse Management + Media; Ryan Murphy Television; Fox 21 Television Studios

Original release
- Network: Netflix
- Release: September 18, 2020

Ratched is an American psychological thriller television series created by Evan Romansky, developed by Ryan Murphy and starring Sarah Paulson in the title role of Nurse Mildred Ratched. A prequel to Miloš Forman's 1975 film One Flew Over the Cuckoo's Nest (based on Ken Kesey's 1962 novel of the same title), it depicts the life of Mildred Ratched prior to the events portrayed in the film, albeit in a different state (California as opposed to Oregon). Ratched received a two-season series order. The first season premiered on Netflix on September 18, 2020. In August 2022, Paulson said she was unsure if the second season was still happening. In February 2024, Ratched was canceled after one season.

== Premise ==
Ratched is a suspenseful drama series that tells the origin story of asylum nurse Mildred Ratched. In 1947, Mildred arrives in Northern California to seek employment at a leading psychiatric hospital where new and unsettling experiments have begun on the human mind. On a clandestine mission, Mildred presents herself as the perfect image of what a dedicated nurse should be, but the wheels are always turning and as she begins to infiltrate the mental health care system and those within it, Mildred's stylish exterior belies a growing darkness that has long been smoldering within, revealing that true monsters are made, not born.

— Netflix

== Cast and characters ==
=== Main ===
- Sarah Paulson as Mildred Ratched, a nurse who is hired by Dr. Hanover to work at Lucia State Hospital. Secretly, her motive is to break her brother Edmund out of the hospital after he is admitted there for killing several priests.
- Finn Wittrock as Edmund Tolleson, the murderous and mentally unstable foster brother of Ratched, a nurse at Lucia State Hospital
- Cynthia Nixon as Gwendolyn Briggs, Governor Willburn's press secretary and campaign manager, and Ratched's love interest
- Jon Jon Briones as Dr. Richard Hanover/Dr. Manuel Bañaga, the director of Lucia State Hospital who hires Ratched
- Charlie Carver as Huck Finnigan, an orderly at Lucia State Hospital, his face badly disfigured from a war injury
- Judy Davis as Nurse Betsy Bucket, the head nurse at Lucia State Hospital and a rival of Ratched
- Sharon Stone as Lenore Osgood, a wealthy heiress who hires a hit man to kill Dr. Hanover for disfiguring her son after she hired him to treat her son's mental illness

=== Recurring ===
- Corey Stoll as Charles Wainwright, a private investigator and hit man who accepts a contract on Dr. Hanover from Lenore Osgood
- Vincent D'Onofrio as Governor George Wilburn, the governor of California
- Alice Englert as Nurse Dolly, a nurse trainee with undiagnosed nymphomania at Lucia State, and Edmund's love interest
- Amanda Plummer as Louise, the owner of the motel that Ratched and Wainwright stay at and a friend to Nurse Bucket
- Jermaine Williams as Harold, a security guard at Lucia State
- Annie Starke as Lily Cartwright, a patient at Lucia State who is being treated for her lesbianism
- Brandon Flynn as Henry Osgood, Lenore's psychopathic killer-turned-amputee son who was disfigured by Dr. Hanover when he was his patient
- Michael Benjamin Washington as Trevor Briggs, Gwendolyn's husband with whom she is in a lavender marriage
- Sophie Okonedo as Charlotte Wells, a patient at Lucia State with dissociative identity disorder

=== Guests ===
- Hunter Parrish as Father Andrews
- Robert Curtis Brown as Monsignor Sullivan
- David Wells as Father Murphy
- Emily Mest as Nurse Amelia Emerson
- Daniel Di Tomasso as Dario Salvatore
- Harriet Sansom Harris as Ingrid Blix, an opera singer who is lobotomized
- Liz Femi as Leona
- Joseph Marcell as Len Bronley
- Ben Crowley as Reggie Hampson
- Rosanna Arquette as Anna, Ratched and Edmund's former case worker in the foster care system
- Kerry Knuppe as Doris Mayfair
- Benjamin Rigby as Case Hitchen
- Teo Briones as Peter, a boy who is lobotomized by Dr. Hanover to cure daydreaming

== Episodes ==
No.	Title	Directed by	Written by	Original release date
1	"Pilot"	Ryan Murphy	Evan Romansky	September 18, 2020
In 1947, Edmund Tolleson murders four priests, one of whom he claims to be his father. Six months later, he is arrested and sentenced to 120 days in Lucia State Hospital, a mental institution in Northern California. Mildred Ratched steals the position of a nurse in the same hospital through blackmail. While Governor George Wilburn visits the hospital for funding, Ratched pulls a stunt by dosing an old patient with blood pressure reducing medicine. When the patient suffers a cardiogenic shock, Ratched saves him in front of the press and the governor. She then provokes Salvatore, an abandoned patient, to die by suicide in Dr. Hanover's office. Ratched assures Dr. Hanover the concealment of the incident, gaining his trust. When Edmund arrives at the hospital, he and Ratched embrace.
2	"Ice Pick"	Ryan Murphy	Ian Brennan	September 18, 2020
Dr. Hanover performs a lobotomy on a subject which fails. He then introduces a more convenient procedure involving an ice pick. Ratched visits Father Andrews, a survivor and a witness of Edmund's murders, and convinces him to interview with Dr. Hanover. Gwendolyn Briggs, the governor's campaign manager, takes Ratched to a women's club in Monterey. Ratched is offended by being mistaken for a lesbian and leaves. Father Andrews agrees on interviewing with Dr. Hanover. Ratched takes him to her motel room and records his confession, claiming to do so for Dr. Hanover. She sedates him and, after revealing that Edmund is her brother, performs the ice pick procedure on him. The procedure puts Father Andrews in a state of catatonia.
3	"Angel of Mercy"	Nelson Cragg	Ian Brennan	September 18, 2020
Wainwright, a PI, visits Lenore Osgood with the news that Hanover is an alias for Manuel Bañaga, who was responsible for the mutilation of her son Henry that rendered him limbless. She hires Wainwright to kill Hanover. Hanover develops a new therapy that involves immersing patients in excessively hot water. Ratched learns that Nurse Dolly is having sexual relations with Edmund. Hanover escapes an assassination attempt. Ratched has an interlude in her hotel room with Wainwright; she flashes on images of Gwendolyn during sex. Ratched asks Hanover why he's being hunted, and he explains how he caused Henry's injuries in a botched procedure after being drugged by him. Ratched offers to help him hide.
4	"Angel of Mercy: Part Two"	Michael Uppendahl	Evan Romansky	September 18, 2020
The governor is eager to see Edmund deemed fit for trial due to the upcoming election. Dolly confesses her attraction to dangerous men to Ratched, who offers to arrange a meeting. Hanover is self-medicating with sodium pentothal. Huck Finnigan (a hospital orderly) sabotages the hot tubs to prevent another patient from being abused. Wainwright continues to search for Hanover. Ratched offers to help. They have sex again, and Gwendolyn overhears. Ratched and Finnigan help the two patients whom Hanover had been abusing to escape. Ratched sneaks Wainwright into the hospital. Wainwright makes his way to Hanover's office but Hanover manages to knock him unconscious. Wainwright is locked in to a boiling iron tub by Ratched and Hanover, but manages to break free. He is then killed by the hospital guard. Ratched contacts Osgood to tell her that Wainwright is dead and suggests she come to Lucia herself. Finnigan tells Ratched she's an angel of mercy for helping the two patients escape, causing Ratched to have a flashback to when she euthanized a suffering soldier.
5	"The Dance"	Michael Uppendahl	Ian Brennan	September 18, 2020
Ratched blackmails Hanover to find Edmund not fit for trial, and to make her head nurse. Ratched instructs Edmund to act insane during the upcoming dance. An extremely agitated Charlotte Wells is admitted with multiple personality disorder. Edmund asks Ratched to provide him with a knife for the dance, saying he will cut himself as part of convincing everyone that he's insane. Hanover has a breakthrough with Charlotte, and later weeps from the emotional intensity of the experience. Bucket (the current head nurse), misled by Ratched, pursues a romantic relationship with Hanover. Hanover spots Osgood stalking him and goes to Ratched for help. Ratched meets with Osgood and agrees to kill Hanover. At the dance, Hanover loses his patience and tells Bucket how much he hates her. Edmund murders the guard and escapes with Dolly, who shoots Gwendolyn.
6	"Got No Strings"	Jessica Yu	Jennifer Salt & Ian Brennan	September 18, 2020
Edmund and Dolly hide in an abandoned farmhouse. Gwendolyn regains consciousness in the hospital. Ratched begins to have feelings for Gwendolyn. Ratched flashes back to her horrific childhood while watching a puppet show with Gwendolyn, and causes a scene, later confessing to Gwendolyn that Edmund is her brother. Edmund and Dolly are captured and Dolly tries to shoot it out with the police, but dies in the gunfight. Edmund is returned to the hospital in chains. The governor is furious, and convinces Hanover to certify Edmund fit for trial. He also cuts the hospital funding and fires Gwendolyn.
7	"The Bucket List"	Jennifer Lynch	Ian Brennan	September 18, 2020
Bucket learns about the relationship between Ratched and Edmund, and how Ratched lobotomized Father Andrews to silence him. She confronts Ratched, who confesses that she was kicked out of the army for euthanizing soldiers. Bucket is sympathetic and agrees that Edmund should not be executed. They meet with a wealthy benefactor and arrange for the continuing support of the hospital and for Hanover to be reported to the police. Ratched helps Hanover escape, along with Charlotte. While hiding in a motel, Charlotte has a psychotic break and kills Hanover. When she recovers, she calls Ratched for help. Ratched helps Charlotte escape, then collects Hanover's head to give to Osgood. Osgood shows the head to Henry, then he has his butler kill her. Ratched tells Gwendolyn she loves her. Gwendolyn tells Ratched that she has terminal cancer. Osgood's will leaves her estate to her pet monkey, and specifies that Henry is to be put in a psychiatric hospital for the rest of his life. Bucket takes over as head of the hospital, naming Huck Finnigan as head nurse.
8	"Mildred and Edmund"	Daniel Minahan	Ian Brennan & Evan Romansky & Jennifer Salt	September 18, 2020
Edmund is scheduled for execution by electric chair. Ratched and Gwendolyn appeal to the governor for mercy, to no avail. They meet with Bucket. Ratched suggests a plan wherein she will kill Edmund herself humanely. Charlotte appears at the hospital, believing herself to be Hanover, and swears to save Edmund from execution. She finds a gun in Hanover's desk and becomes aggressive, killing Huck and a guard. She frees Edmund who then takes the guard's gun and forces Bucket to tell him Ratched's plan. He and Charlotte escape, later taking motel owner Louise on as an accomplice. Three years later, Edmund calls Ratched, having tracked her, Bucket and Gwendolyn to Mexico. He promises to kill her, but Ratched tells him she'll find him first.

== Production ==
=== Development ===
On September 6, 2017, it was announced that Netflix had given the production a series order for two seasons. Netflix reportedly won a bidding war over Hulu and Apple who also were interested in developing the project. The series was created by Evan Romansky who also wrote the pilot. His script was eventually received by television producer Ryan Murphy, who then spent a year securing the rights to the Nurse Ratched character and the participation of the Saul Zaentz estate and Michael Douglas, who owned the screen rights to One Flew Over The Cuckoo's Nest. Murphy directed the pilot and executive produced alongside Douglas, Aleen Keshishian, Margaret Riley and Jacob Epstein. Production companies involved in the series included Fox 21 Television Studios, The Saul Zaentz Company, and Ryan Murphy Productions. Mac Quayle, who has frequently collaborated with Murphy, composed the series's score.

=== Casting ===
Alongside the initial series order announcement, it was confirmed that Sarah Paulson had been cast in the lead role of Nurse Ratched. On December 11, 2018, it was reported that Finn Wittrock and Jon Jon Briones had joined the cast of the series. On January 14, 2019, it was announced that Charlie Carver, Judy Davis, Harriet Harris, Cynthia Nixon, Hunter Parrish, Amanda Plummer, Corey Stoll, and Sharon Stone had been cast in the series. In February 2019, it was reported that Rosanna Arquette, Vincent D'Onofrio, Don Cheadle, Alice Englert, Annie Starke, and Stan Van Winkle had been cast in recurring roles. On July 29, 2020, it was reported that Sophie Okonedo, Liz Femi, and Brandon Flynn were cast in recurring roles.

=== Filming ===
Filming took place in early 2019 in Los Angeles and 20th Century Fox Studios. One of the filming locations was the historic Adamson House in Malibu.

== Reception ==
=== Audience viewership ===
In its first week of release, Ratched was ranked number one in the Nielsen ratings, who announced that the show had been viewed for a total of 972 million minutes. According to Netflix, the series was viewed by 48 million people in its first four weeks.

=== Critical response ===
For the first season, review aggregator Rotten Tomatoes collected 96 critic reviews and identified 61% of them as positive, with an average rating of 6.3/10. The website's critics consensus states, "Ratched is undeniably stylish, but salacious plot holes and cartoonish characterizations undermine its gorgeous production and committed performances." Metacritic assigned the season a weighted average score of 50 out of 100 based on 32 critics, indicating "mixed or average reviews".

In a 5/5 stars review, Nicholas Barber from BBC Online wrote, "Ratched ratchets up everything, from the deeply colourful design to the Bernard Herrmann-like music to noir-ish soap-opera plotting that drips with sex and violence. But it isn't pure camp. Romansky's superb scripts keep tight control of the characters and their intertwining stories, and there are some chillingly accurate depictions of brutal 1940s psychiatric treatment. Ratched is also oddly big-hearted for such a gruesome series. The characters are a crowd of villains, with next to no one who could be classed as heroic, but they are all vulnerable, and most of them are motivated by love – even if that love inspires them to hire a hitman to decapitate an old enemy." The Independent's Alexandra Pollard, who rated it 4/5, found the origin story to be "thoughtful and beguiling".

Darren Franich of Entertainment Weekly gave the series a C− and described the series' clothes as "nice, but they're dressing a corpse." Reviewing the series for The Hollywood Reporter, Inkoo Kang wrote that, "The performances are across-the-board fantastic, but Nixon—playing Ratched's love interest—exhibits such frailty, sensuality and decency that her turn ultimately ends up feeling like it belongs in a much better production." TVLine wrote that the series "might be [Ryan Murphy's] emptiest effort yet", giving it a D.

== Accolades ==
Year	Award	Category	Recipient(s)	Result	Ref.
2021	Critics' Choice Super Awards	Best Villain in a Series	Sarah Paulson	Nominated	
2021	Critics' Choice Super Awards	Best Villain in a Series	Finn Wittrock	Nominated	
2021	GLAAD Media Awards	Outstanding Drama Series	Ratched	Nominated	
2021	Golden Globe Awards	Best Television Series – Drama	Ratched	Nominated	
2021	Golden Globe Awards	Best Actress – Television Series Drama	Sarah Paulson	Nominated	
2021	Golden Globe Awards	Best Supporting Actress – Television	Cynthia Nixon	Nominated	
2021	Hollywood Critics Association TV Awards	Best Actress in a Streaming Series, Drama	Sarah Paulson	Nominated	
2021	Make-Up Artists and Hair Stylists Guild Awards	Best Television Series, Limited or Miniseries or New Media Series – Best Period and/or Character Hair Styling	Chris Clark, Natalie Driscoll, Michelle Ceglia and Dawn Victoria Dudley	Nominated	
2021	Primetime Emmy Awards	Outstanding Guest Actress in a Drama Series	Sophie Okonedo (for "The Dance")	Nominated	
2021	Primetime Emmy Awards	Outstanding Period Costumes	Lou Eyrich, Rebecca Guzzi, Allison Agler and Betsy Glick (for "Pilot")	Nominated	
2021	Primetime Emmy Awards	Outstanding Hairstyling	Chris Clark, Natalie Driscoll, Dawn Victoria Dudley, Michelle Ceglia, George Guzman and Helena Cepeda (for "The Dance")	Nominated	
2021	Primetime Emmy Awards	Outstanding Makeup (Non-Prosthetic)	Eryn Krueger Mekash, Kim Ayers, Mike Mekash and Silvina Knight (for "Pilot")	Nominated	
