= Stacey Lee (film director) =

New Zealand film director

Stacey Lee is a documentary film director from New Zealand.

== Biography ==
Lee began her career in advertising, working for Saatchi & Saatchi in New Zealand from 2002 to 2007, then for advertising agencies 180 Amsterdam and Mother New York. In 2006, she was ranked 9th equal in the world at the YoungGuns International Awards. While working with athletes in Amsterdam for an Adidas campaign, she moved into film-making. Her films have appeared at the 2015 Tribeca Film Festival and the 2020 Toronto International Film Festival.

=== Filmography ===
| Year | Film | Role | Notes | Ref. |
|---|---|---|---|---|
| 2010 | One Fire Ignites Another | Director | No official release | |
| 2015 | Live Fast, Draw Yung | Co-director (with Anthony Mathile) and producer | Winner, Best Documentary Short – 2015 Tacoma Film Festival | |
| 2019 | Underplayed | Director and writer | Feature | |
| 2022 | OLIVIA RODRIGO: driving home 2 u | Director | Winner, Best Music Documentary - 2022 MTV Movie & TV Awards | |
| 2023 | The Secrets of Hillsong | Director | TV miniseries | |
| 2026 | Murder 101 | Director | TV miniseries | |
| 2026 | Get Huge: Looksmaxxing to Death | Director and executive producer | TV miniseries | |
