= Margaret Riley =

American film and television producer (1965–2024)

- Publicity photo of Margaret Riley
- Born: December 9, 1965
- Died: January 23, 2024 (aged 58); Brentwood, Los Angeles, California, U.S.
- Occupation: Film producer
- Notable work: Bombshell

Margaret Riley (December 9, 1965 – January 23, 2024) was an American film and television producer, agent, and manager. She was known for producing the film Bombshell (2019). She was also an executive producer on the films Gray Matters (2006), Love & Other Drugs (2010), and Billie Eilish: The World's a Little Blurry (2021), and the television series Ratched (2020). Riley's clients included Mark Ruffalo, Bridget Moynahan, Anthony E. Zuiker, Charles Randolph, Margaret Nagle and Joe Berlinger. Zuiker said, "Margaret Riley managed me for a quarter of a century".

== Personal life and death ==
Riley was born on December 9, 1965. She received a journalism degree from the University of Kansas. Riley moved to Los Angeles and received a graduate degree from the American Film Institute. She died of ovarian cancer at her home in Brentwood on January 23, 2024, at the age of 58.
