= 40 Under 40 =

Annual Fortune magazine list

Fortune magazine's 40 Under 40 is a list of individuals the publication considers to be the most influential young leaders for the year. The list has existed in two phases: From 1999 to 2003, the list was presented purely as a numeric ranking of wealth, capturing the first dot com boom. The next iteration started in 2009 and is a subjective ranking of power and influence. The list includes business executives, political figures, sportsmen, fashion designers, and others who are under the age of forty years old. The majority of the list members are business executives from the tech industry.

The list often features business men and women who have made their names in various enterprises, and does not always choose candidates from blue chip industries.

== See also ==
- Forbes Magazine's 30 under 30
- WEF's Young Global Leaders
- Capital's Top 40 Under 40
- MIT's Innovators Under 35
- The Business Journal's Forty Under 40
- GLAAD's 20 Under 20
