= Israel Keyes =

American serial killer (1978–2012)

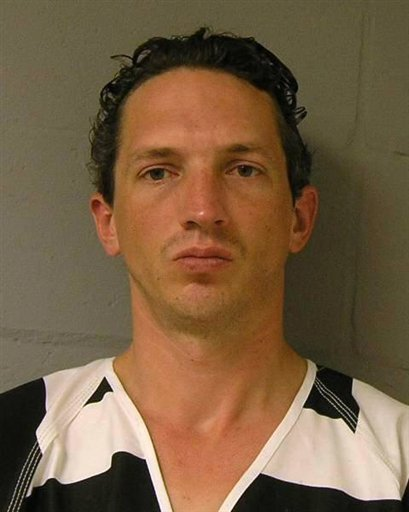
- 2012 mugshot of Keyes taken at the Anchorage Correctional Complex
- Born: January 7, 1978; Richmond, Utah, U.S.
- Died: December 1, 2012 (aged 34); Anchorage, Alaska, U.S.
- Cause of death: Suicide by exsanguination and strangulation
- Height: 6 ft 2 in (1.88 m)
- Children: 1
- Motive: Thrill; Sexual fetishism; Robbery; (Note: "I was kind of on an adrenaline phase. [...] That's always the reason I've done the kind of things I've done. Mostly for the adrenaline. It's not so much why I did it as 'why not?'" "With me it's a combination of things. [...] It's not just about the sexual fantasy, and it's definitely not just about the money, and it's not just about the adrenaline. It's all those things together, and that's what I get out of it. And once I did it, once I started, there was nothing else like it.")

Details
- Victims: 3 confirmed Up to or possibly exceeding 11 suspected
- Span of crimes: 1997–2012
- Country: United States
- States: Alaska, New York, Vermont, Washington, Oregon, Texas (confirmed)
- Date apprehended: March 13, 2012
- Imprisoned at: Anchorage Correctional Complex, Anchorage, Alaska
- Military career
- Allegiance: United States
- Branch: United States Army
- Service years: 1998–2001
- Rank: Specialist
- Units: 5th Infantry Regiment, 25th Infantry Division

Israel Keyes (January 7, 1978 – December 1, 2012) was an American serial killer, rapist, bank robber, burglar, arsonist, kidnapper and shoplifter. He also sold guns illegally and was cruel to animals.

Keyes is known to have murdered three people. Law enforcement investigators believe he committed a number of other violent crimes across the United States between the late 1990s and early 2012. Keyes was arrested in March 2012 in connection with the killing of a woman in Alaska, and died by suicide while awaiting trial. Evidence in his jail cell led the Federal Bureau of Investigation (FBI) to believe he may have killed eleven people.

== Early life ==
=== Childhood ===
Israel Keyes was born in Richmond, Utah, on January 7, 1978, the second of ten children of Heidi Keyes (née Hakansson) and John Jeffrey "Jeff" Keyes. His parents lived in Torrance, California, and were members of various different Protestant religions, and at one point were members of the Church of Jesus Christ of Latter-day Saints (LDS Church). His father had also served a church mission in Germany.

Keyes and his siblings were homeschooled before the family moved in 1983 to a remote plot of land north of Colville, Washington. Isolated from society, the family lived in a one-room cabin on Rocky Creek Road that lacked electricity and running water. Because their cabin was small, some of the children slept in a tent. They were also made to hunt for their own food, chop firewood and work on local farms to help support the family. Following his arrest, investigators and Keyes's former commanding officer stated that they suspected he had been abused by his father.

In Colville, the family attended services at a church called The Ark, which subscribed to white supremacist and Christian Identity ideology. Keyes later described The Ark as practicing a lifestyle similar to that of the Amish, who subscribe to a life devoid of the conveniences of modern life. During this period of attending The Ark, the Keyes family befriended the neighboring family of Chevie Kehoe, who was later convicted for a 1996 triple murder.

=== Adolescence ===
The Keyes family eventually left The Ark for the Christian Israel Covenant Church, which also subscribed to white supremacist ideology. Keyes later described the church as militia-like. Keyes was known to hunt "anything with a heartbeat" and later told peers at the church that he had skinned a live deer. As a result, he was ostracized by other children. A former classmate later said that Keyes's presence "made my skin crawl".

Keyes, who was 1.88 m (6 ft 2 in) by the age of 14, admitted to shooting at his neighbors' houses with his BB gun, as well as starting fires in the woods. He also broke into houses with another youth, who later distanced himself from Keyes after witnessing him shoot an animal during one of their outings. Keyes later told investigators that by age 14 he believed some of his thoughts were "normal and okay" even though others did not, and said that he began isolating himself after others learned of his behavior.

In his adolescence, Keyes's parents discovered a cache of guns he had stolen from a neighbor and forced him to return the guns and apologize. Around this time, in 1994, Keyes was arrested for shoplifting and was given community service. Keyes also sold stolen guns to local residents. During this time, Keyes's parents provided shelter to family friends. According to later accounts, their children, along with Keyes's sister, witnessed him tie a cat to a tree with a parachute cord and shoot it with a .22 revolver. Keyes later said he found the incident amusing. Keyes claimed that this incident led to his increasing isolation and his desire to conceal his antisocial behavior. Keyes also stated that he felt "different from his peers" and ultimately kept his antisocial behavior to himself. His mother later said she began to notice troubling behavior in him during this period.

By his teenage years, Keyes had become a skilled carpenter, building his first wooden cabin at age 16. He also worked for a Colville contractor from 1995 to 1997. Around this time, Keyes started keeping a journal, which included biblical quotations, and where he documented daily sins he had committed for which he felt shame, such as lusting after his girlfriend. Later, the family relocated to Smyrna, Maine, where they collected sap for maple syrup production in a mostly Amish community. Their mother prohibited the children from watching movies with friends or learning musical instruments, believing such activities were "against God". Some time during this period, Keyes renounced his Christian faith.

Keyes declared his atheism to his parents—whom he had previously tried to please—after an argument. This led them to evict Keyes for blasphemy, instructing his younger siblings, who looked up to Keyes, to never have contact with him again. Keyes then became interested in Satanism, and planned to commit a ritualistic murder.

== Adulthood ==
=== Deschutes River assault ===
In the summer of 1997 or 1998, Keyes sexually assaulted a teenage girl, believed to have been between 14 and 18 years old, who had been tubing with her friends down the Deschutes River in Maupin, Oregon. Keyes admitted that he stalked her from a tree line before threatening the girl with a knife and "very violently sexually assaulting" her. Originally planning to murder her as part of a Satanic ritual, Keyes was dissuaded by her entreaties and her promise not to tell anybody what had happened. He let her go in the river tube he had abducted her from. Keyes later told investigators, "I was too timid. I wasn't violent enough", adding that he had decided he would not "let that happen again".

=== Military service ===
On April 22, 1998, Keyes enlisted in the U.S. Army in Albany, New York, under the Delayed Enlistment Program, reporting for basic training on July 9, 1998. He served as a Specialist in Alpha Company, 1st Battalion, 5th Infantry, 25th Infantry Division. He completed a month-long preliminary course for Army Ranger training but did not attend Ranger School. He was stationed at Fort Lewis and Fort Hood, also spending some time abroad. While stationed in the Sinai Peninsula, Keyes befriended several soldiers and at one point told one of them that he would "like to kill him".

While at Fort Lewis, Keyes served on a mortar team. Former Army friends of Keyes have noted his quiet demeanor and habit of keeping to himself. On weekends, he was reported to drink heavily, consuming entire bottles of his favorite drink, Wild Turkey bourbon. In February 2001, Keyes was arrested in Thurston County for driving under the influence and was fined US$350 after reaching a plea agreement.

Keyes was awarded an Army Achievement Medal for his service as a gunner and assistant gunner from December 1998 until July 8, 2001. He was then honorably discharged and relocated to Neah Bay, Washington.

=== Personal life ===
For a period, Keyes lived in the Makah Reservation community of Neah Bay, on the Olympic Peninsula in Washington; he had a Native American girlfriend, Tammie Hawkins, whom he met online in late 2000. The couple later had a daughter. Keyes and Hawkins broke up in 2004, and at the time of his arrest he was dating a nurse named Kimberly Anderson.

In 2007, Keyes started a construction business in Alaska called Keyes Construction, while working as a handyman, contractor, and construction worker.

== Criminal history ==
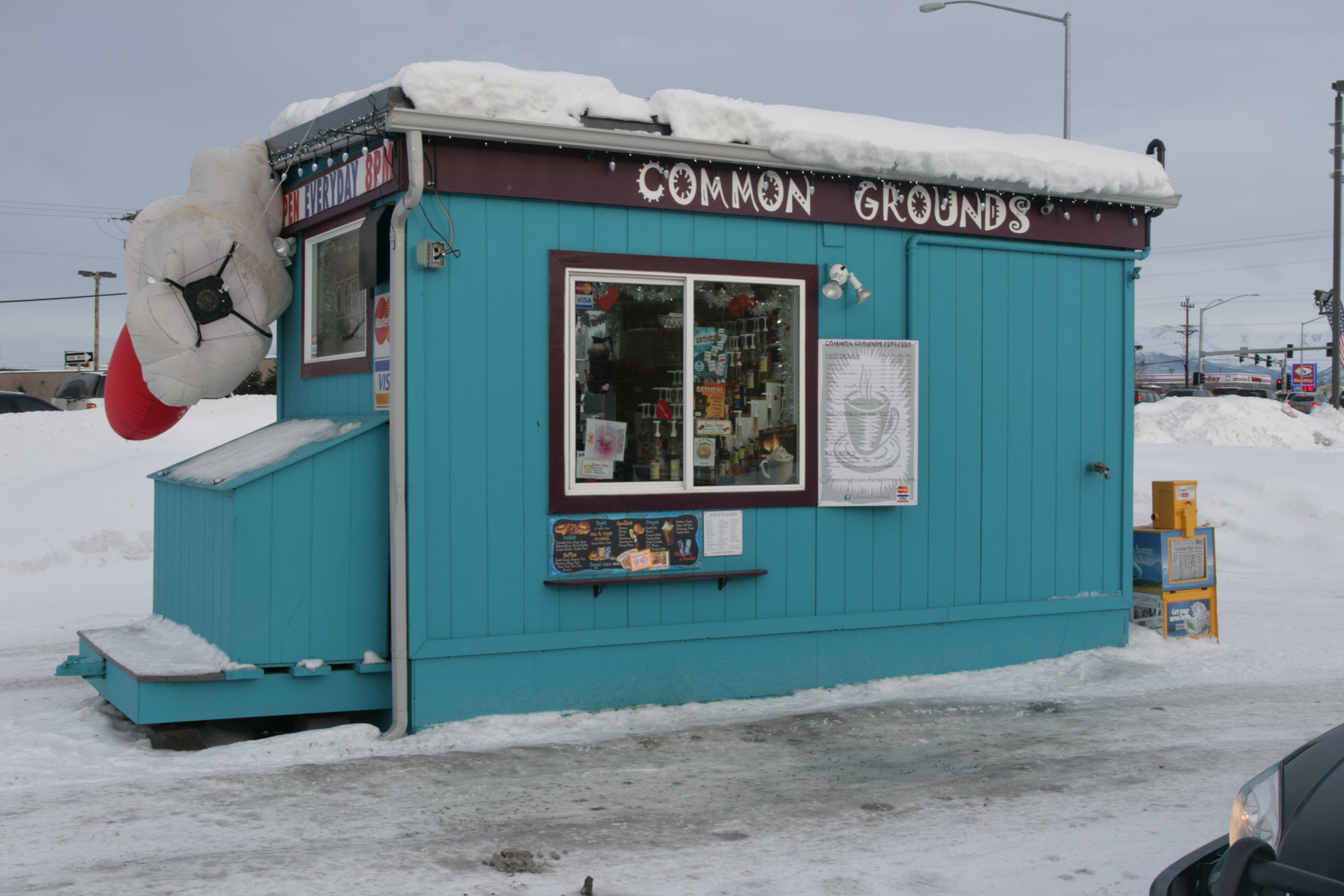
Common Grounds in Anchorage, Alaska, after the kidnapping of Samantha Koenig

Investigators stated that Keyes often traveled long distances and planned crimes in advance, which complicated efforts to link him to unsolved cases. He claimed to use guns only when he had to and said he preferred strangulation because he derived pleasure from witnessing victims lose consciousness.

Keyes did not admit to any murders during his three years in the United States Army. However, he did confess to attempted rape of a female sex worker while on leave in Egypt and to the attempted rape of a college student he met while on leave in Israel. He also confessed to committing bank robberies in New York and Texas. The FBI later confirmed that Keyes robbed the Community Bank branch in Tupper Lake, New York, in April 2009. He also told authorities he burglarized a Texas home and set it on fire. FBI records indicate that Keyes committed numerous burglaries and bank robberies between 2001 and 2012.

Keyes is suspected of killing eleven people in the United States. Investigators stated Keyes did not appear to follow a consistent victim profile, and he told authorities he chose victims at random. Investigators stated Keyes often flew into a city, rented a car, and drove long distances before committing a crime, then returned to Alaska. They said this travel pattern complicated efforts to link him to other cases. On his murder trips, he kept his mobile phone turned off and paid for items with cash. For the Currier murders, Keyes flew to Chicago, where he rented a car and drove 1,000 mi (1,600 km) to Vermont. He then used a "murder kit" he had hidden two years earlier to execute the murders.

=== Confessed victims ===
During interviews with FBI agents and officials in Alaska, Keyes admitted to three murders in which identities of the victims were confirmed. He confessed to murdering 49-year-old William "Bill" Scott Currier and 55-year-old Lorraine Simonne Currier of Essex, Vermont. On the night of June 8, 2011, Keyes broke into the Currier home and tied them up before driving them to an abandoned farmhouse, where he shot Bill before sexually assaulting and strangling Lorraine. Their bodies have never been found. Two years earlier, Keyes had buried a "murder kit" near the Currier home, which he later recovered and used during the crime. After the murders, he moved most of the kit's contents to a new hiding place in Parishville, New York, where they remained until after his arrest.

His final confirmed victim was 18-year-old Samantha Tessla Koenig, a coffee booth employee in Anchorage, Alaska. On February 1, 2012, Keyes abducted Koenig from her workplace, took her debit card and other property, then raped and sodomized her before strangling her with a cable tie. He left her body in a shed in his backyard and traveled to New Orleans for a pre-booked cruise with his family in the Gulf of Mexico. When he returned to Anchorage on February 18, he sexually assaulted Koenig's body. Keyes then applied makeup to the corpse's face, and sewed her eyes open with fishing line in an attempt to make it appear that she was still alive. He photographed her body alongside a four-day-old issue of the Anchorage Daily News. After demanding US$30,000 in ransom, some of which was paid into Koenig's bank account, Keyes dismembered her body and disposed of it in Matanuska Lake, north of Anchorage. Her remains were later recovered by the FBI's Underwater Search and Evidence Response Team.

Keyes confessed to abducting a woman on April 9, 2009, from a state on the East Coast, transporting her across multiple state lines, and burying her in New York near Tupper Lake. Investigators later identified the likely victim as Debra J. Feldman, age 48, who disappeared from her apartment in Hackensack, New Jersey, on April 8, 2009. Keyes's computer had been used to access an article written by an unrelated woman named "Deborah Feldman", and investigators theorized that he may have misspelled her first name. When shown a photograph of Debra Feldman, Keyes paused before saying, "I don't want to talk about her yet." The FBI later stated that they believed Feldman may have been one of Keyes's victims.

=== Possible and ruled-out victims ===
Keyes hinted at other murders and was considered a suspect in additional cases that coincided with his whereabouts or matched aspects of his modus operandi. However, he has not been definitively linked to these crimes, and the identities of several victims remain uncertain.

Julie Marie Harris, a 12-year-old Special Olympics medalist in skiing, disappeared on March 2, 1996, while waiting for a ride to a local church in Colville, Washington. Her remains were found in April 1997 in a wooded area nearby. Keyes, then 18, lived in the area at the time and was questioned about the case after his 2012 arrest. He neither confirmed nor denied involvement, stating only that he had "heard about that".

Cassandra "Cassie" Emerson, 12, was reported missing in 1997 after the remains of her mother, Marlene Kay Emerson, were discovered in their burned-out trailer home in Colville, Washington. Cassie's remains were later found approximately 21 km (13 mi) away. Keyes admitted his first act of arson involved a trailer in Colville, and he was at one time considered a suspect in the Emerson deaths. However, in December 2024, Charles Tatom was arrested in connection with the murders.

Giovanna Tyler, a 29-year-old woman from Tacoma, Washington, was reported missing in 2004. Media coverage later discussed her case among those examined in possible connection with Keyes.

Keyes also told investigators he had killed multiple people in Washington State between 2001 and 2006, including victims he claimed to have buried or submerged in lakes near Neah Bay and Lake Crescent. Authorities reviewed unsolved homicide and missing persons cases in Washington following these statements, but no additional murders have been publicly confirmed as attributable to Keyes. A body recovered near Neah Bay was ultimately ruled an accidental death.

Keyes has been suggested as a possible suspect in a series of unsolved 2007 crimes near the Town Center at Boca Raton in Florida: the abduction and murder of Randi Ann Malitz Gorenberg; the abduction of an unidentified woman and her toddler son who were released after paying a ransom to the man who abducted them; and the abduction and murder of Nancy Bochicchio and her daughter, Joey Bochicchio-Hauser. In all these cases victims were taken by force from the parking lots of shopping centers, and the surviving woman said her abductor was a slender young white man who generally matched Keyes description. However, authorities have not publicly confirmed Keyes was connected with those crimes.

He has also been suggested as a suspect in the disappearance of James "Jimmy" Lamar Tidwell Jr., an electrician who disappeared in Mount Enterprise, Texas, on February 15, 2012. Authorities examined similarities between Tidwell's appearance and a bank robbery suspect in Azle, Texas, the following day, but no definitive link has been established.

=== Study of serial killers ===
A search of Keyes's residence found dozens of books about murders, both fiction and non-fiction. Keyes re-read Dean Koontz's 1995 thriller Intensity on several occasions and closely identified with the serial killer antagonist. He closely studied Mindhunter: Inside the FBI's Elite Serial Crime Unit by FBI profiler John E. Douglas in his youth. Keyes also undertook a meticulous study of other serial killers. Keyes admired Ted Bundy and felt that he shared many similarities with him. Both Keyes and Bundy were methodical and felt as though they possessed their victims despite their difference in victim choice and modi operandi. Keyes went as far as imitating Bundy's court escape and was immediately seized by guards.

He also admired and studied other serial killers, yet actively shunned media attention for his crimes as he was fearful for his family and for being labelled a "copycat" for his admiration of Bundy and other murderers. According to Hunter, Keyes described Dennis Rader as a "wimp" for apologizing in court, but expressed admiration for serial killers "that haven't been caught". According to Hunter, when asked in an interview about Alaska-based murderer Robert Hansen, Keyes responded by saying, "Yeah, I know all about him." He continued: "I probably know every single serial killer that's ever been written about. It's kind of a hobby of mine." When FBI agents informed him of the 2012 Aurora theater shooting, he asked about the status of the suspect and expressed interest in the perpetrator, James Holmes.

== Investigation, arrest, and imprisonment ==
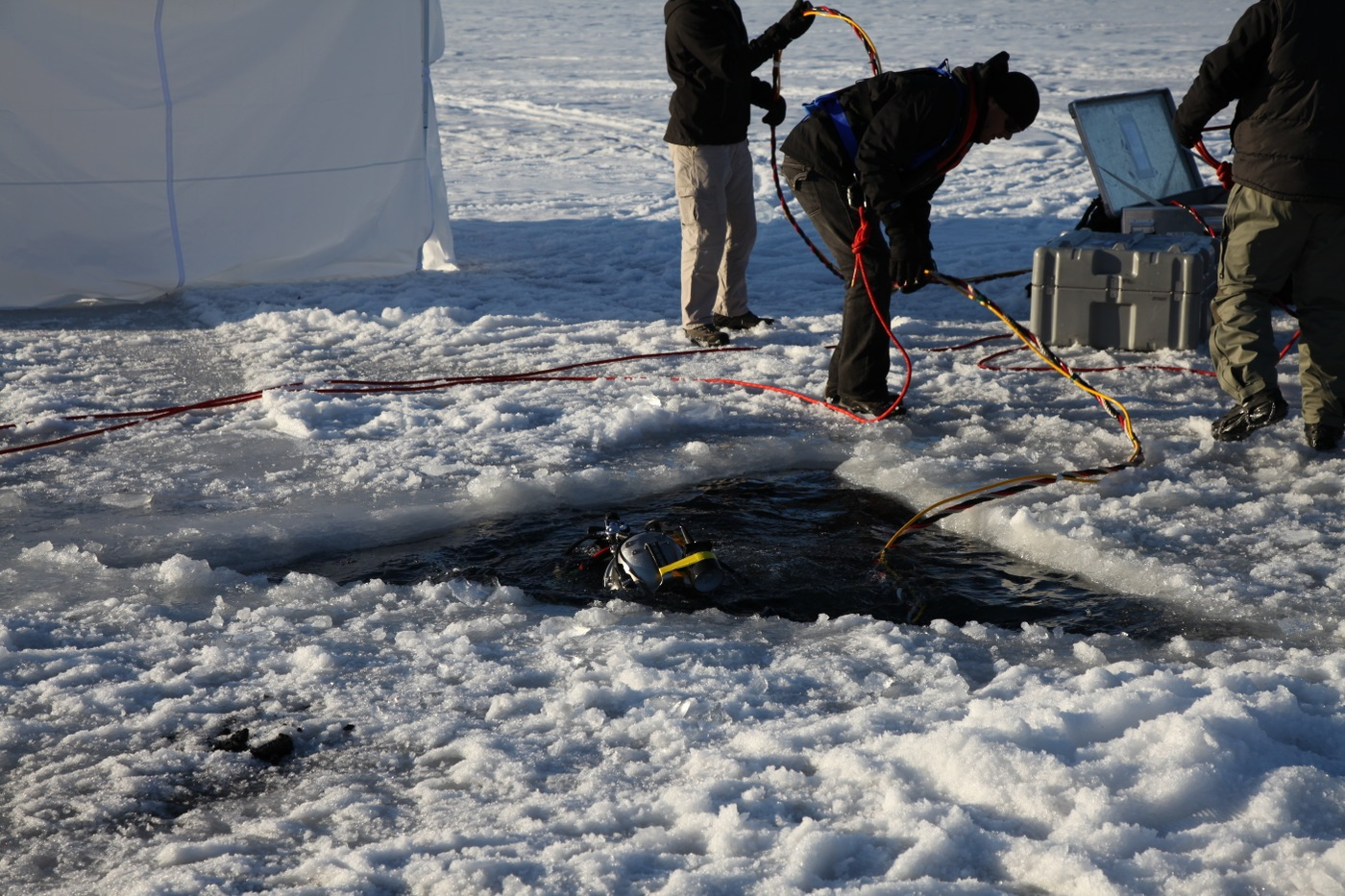
FBI searching Matanuska Lake for the remains of Samantha Koenig

After Koenig's murder, Keyes demanded ransom money be deposited to her bank account. Police were able to track withdrawals from her account as he moved throughout the southwestern U.S.. During that time, the police controversially refused to release a surveillance video of Koenig's abduction.

Keyes was arrested by Texas Highway Patrol Corporal Bryan Henry and Texas Ranger Steven Rayburn, assisted by FBI Special Agent Deb Rose (née Gannaway at the time), in the parking lot of the Cotton Patch Café in Lufkin, Texas, on the morning of March 13, 2012. Investigators had circulated a lookout bulletin for the suspect's car, which had been used at ATMs to withdraw money from Koenig's account.

Keyes came to their attention when law enforcement officers were monitoring hotel parking lots for out-of-state rental cars matching the police bulletin. Officers stopped Keyes after he drove slightly over the speed limit and searched his vehicle after they noticed cash stained with bright ink, indicating a dye pack from a bank robbery. Koenig's ATM card and cell phone were also discovered in Keyes's car.

Keyes was subsequently extradited to Alaska, where he initially claimed Koenig's ATM card and phone came into his possession after someone tossed the items in his open car window. He was charged with fraud related to use of Koenig's bank accounts but eventually confessed to the Koenig murder. He was represented by Rich Curtner, Federal Public Defender for Alaska. Keyes was indicted and his trial was scheduled to begin in March 2013.

While incarcerated, Keyes spoke to state and federal investigators several times over a period of months. He initially cooperated to an extent, confessing to some of his crimes and stating a wish to be executed within a year. FBI Special Agent Jolene Goeden said law enforcement conducted more than forty hours of interviews with Keyes in hopes of identifying additional victims and understanding the scope of his crimes. Keyes at times engaged in conversational exchanges with agents during these interviews and was described as cooperative early on, but he declined to disclose full details about many of his alleged killings without assurances regarding sentencing. Keyes said he wanted to avoid publicity due to the negative attention his young daughter and family might face. Law enforcement were able to corroborate much of Keyes's claims and they believe he was mostly accurate, but they also maintained suspicion he might be misleading or lying in some statements. He largely stopped cooperating after his identity was discussed in the media.

Separate from the Anchorage investigation, the FBI's Houston Field Office released requests for information about Keyes's travels and activities in the Houston area, indicating investigators were interested in his movements across multiple regions of the United States and possible connection to crimes.

On Wednesday, May 23, 2012, Keyes attempted to escape during a routine court hearing, using wood shavings from a pencil to pick his handcuffs. US Marshals used a taser to subdue him.

Beginning in 2018, portions of Keyes's recorded FBI interviews were released to the public through court filings and media outlets, providing additional insight into his methods and the investigators' strategy.

=== FBI public timeline ===
Investigators noted Keyes's use of cash, long-distance travel, and his lack of victim selection patterns complicated efforts to link him to unsolved crimes. Federal and state agencies reviewed hundreds of missing persons and homicide cases but stated many potential connections could not be conclusively established.

In August 2013, the FBI released a public timeline of Keyes's known travel and transactions and asked for information about his activities during periods when investigators believed he may have engaged in criminal activity.

Maureen Callahan wrote that some investigative records on Keyes were not publicly released and Freedom of Information Act requests were met with claims of national security. Given his known connections to political extremists and the national security claims, Callahan speculates Keyes may have possible links to terrorists or may have been planning terrorist acts.

The FBI has released selected investigative records related to Keyes through its FBI Vault program. These materials include interview summaries, evidence descriptions, and investigative memoranda used by federal agents in attempts to identify additional victims.

The most detailed timeline available, published by independent researchers in 2025, contains more than 1,000 entries.

=== Caches ===
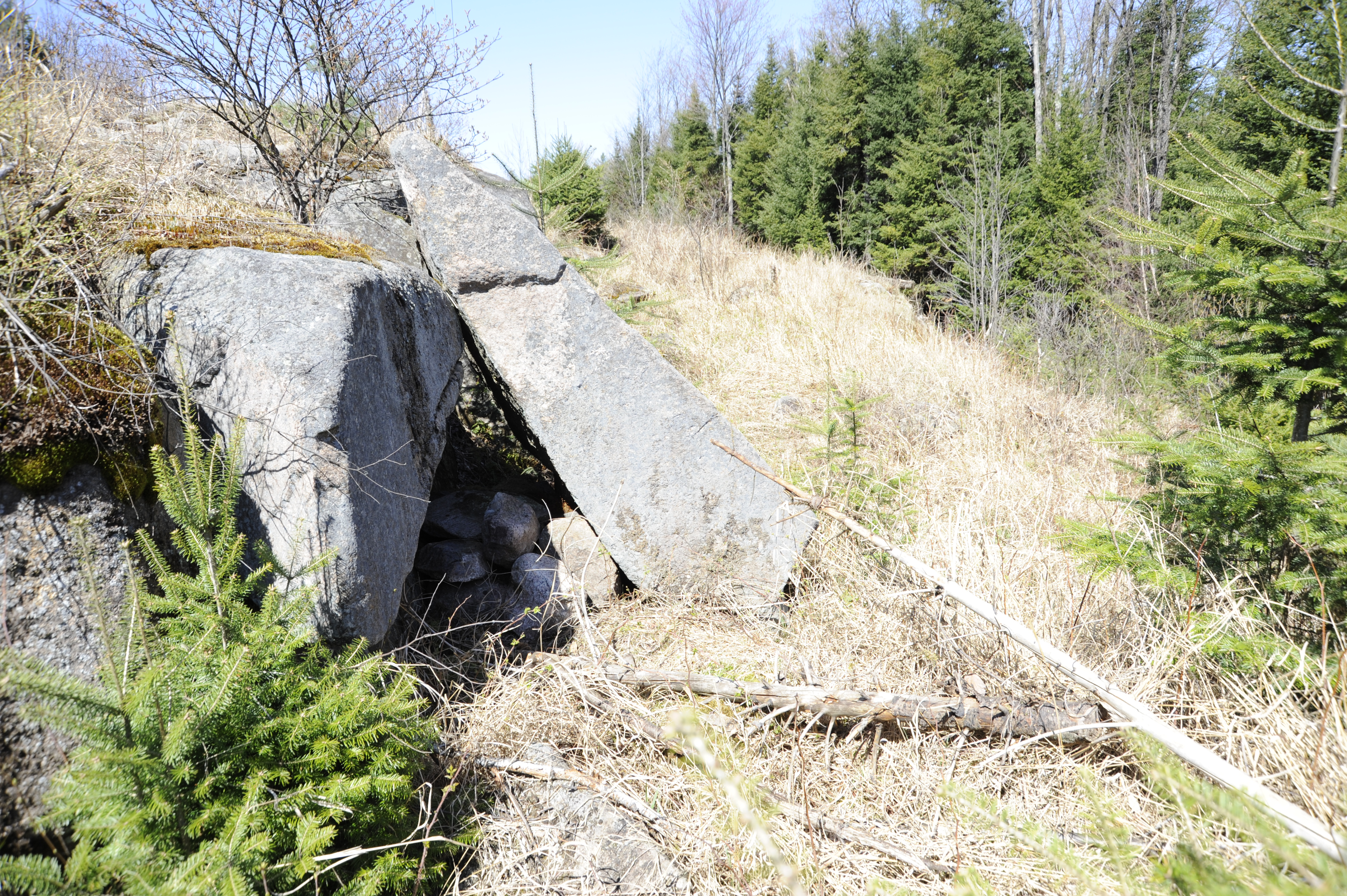
Location of cache hidden by Israel Keyes in Blake Falls Reservoir at Adirondack Park in Parishville, New York

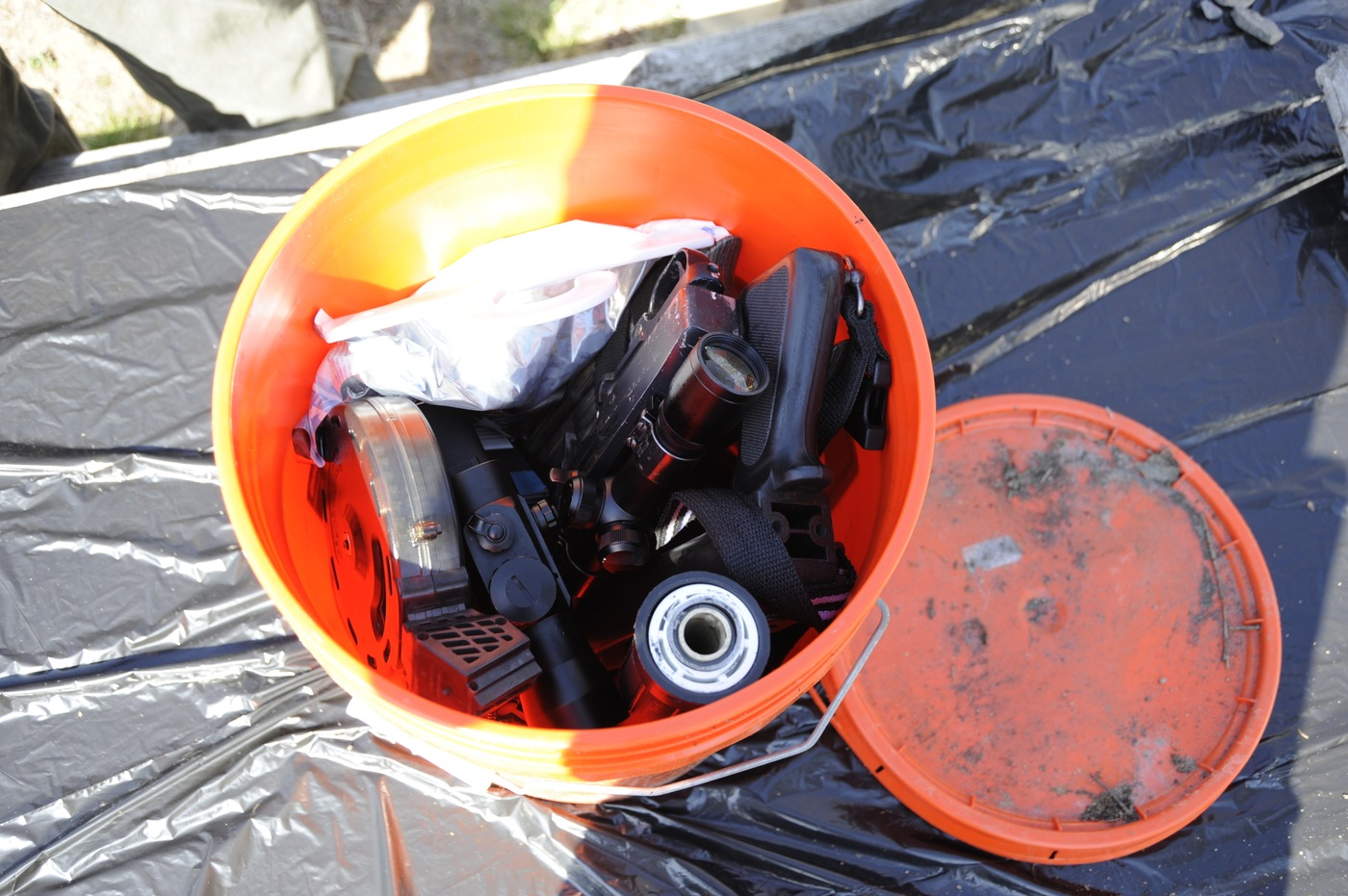
Weapons and other materials in a cache hidden by Keyes

According to an FBI press release, Keyes buried caches of supplies in multiple locations for use in future crimes. Agents recovered two such caches which contained weapons and other items he used to engage in crimes. One cache was found in Eagle River, Alaska, and one near Blake Falls Reservoir in New York.

Investigators stated Keyes also indicated additional caches may exist near Green River, Wyoming, and Port Angeles, Washington.

=== International travel ===
The FBI reported that Keyes traveled internationally, and it was unknown whether he committed any homicides outside the United States. In an FBI timeline release, law enforcement listed known periods of international travel, including British Columbia (April 20–25, 2005), Belize (October 3, 2001 – October 31, 2005), Mexico (April 24 – May 4, 2007; and December 11–25, 2008), and Keyes's drive through Canada to Alaska (March 1–9, 2007).

The FBI timeline noted Keyes lived in Washington from 2001 until March 2007, a period during which investigators believe he may have disposed of multiple bodies in that state.

== Death ==
While being held in jail at the Anchorage Correctional Complex, Keyes managed to conceal a razor blade in his cell. It is uncertain how Keyes obtained the blade, as he was under security restrictions of using an electric razor under supervision. He died by suicide on the night of December 1, 2012, by slitting his left wrist and strangling himself with a rolled up bedsheet.

A four-page suicide note was found underneath his body. Its contents, described by one reporter as "a creepy ode to murder," offered no clear clues about other possible victims. In 2020, the FBI released pictures of twelve drawings which were found in his cell on July 24, 2012. Made using his own blood, they depicted Baphomet in an inverted pentagram and 11 skulls, each bearing an inverted cross on its forehead. The phrase "WE ARE ONE" was written beneath a drawing of one of the skulls. The FBI stated that the 11 skulls were thought to represent the total number of homicides committed by Keyes, several of whom have yet to be identified.

== In media ==
Keyes has been the subject of several books, articles, and other content. Before his arrest, he followed media coverage of his own crimes and posted public comments to the KTVA website on 3/1/2012, 3/2/2012, and 3/4/2012. The Israel Keyes News Archive at Last Known Contact lists more than 300 additional sources. Multiple true crime podcasts have discussed him, including True Crime Bullsh**, which focuses primarily on Keyes and his potential victims. Keyes was also the subject of the first season of the podcast Deviant which used interviews with Keyes, as well as original reporting and interviews with case agents, to tell the story of his crimes. Documentaries published about Israel Keyes include:

- Method of a Serial Killer released in 2018 by the Oxygen channel.
- Dark Minds season 3 episode 2: The Secrets of Israel Keyes released on April 2, 2014.
- Inside the Mind of a Serial Killer season 1 episode 8: Israel Keys [sic] released in 2015.
- 48 Hours season 32 episode 37: Tracking the Murders of Israel Keyes released on May 9, 2020.
- Wild Crime: Eleven Skulls released on December 5, 2024.
- Israel Keyes: Life in Full Detail released on February 23, 2025 by Crime Culture Media.

Most of the FBI interviews were released publicly by Anchorage Daily News to SoundCloud that same year. They were removed in 2019 but have since become available on YouTube. Video of his arrest, Texas Rangers and Anchorage Police Department interviews, and evidence from Vermont, Texas, and Alaska were released by Crime Culture Media in 2025.

=== Bibliography ===
- Callahan, Maureen (2019). American Predator: The Hunt for the Most Meticulous Serial Killer of the 21st Century. New York: Viking. ISBN 978-0-525-42864-0.
- Hunter, J. T. (2016). Devil in the Darkness: The True Story of Serial Killer Israel Keyes. Pedialaw Press. ISBN 978-0-578-70996-3.

== See also ==
- List of serial killers in the United States
