= The Megyn Kelly Show =

American political podcast

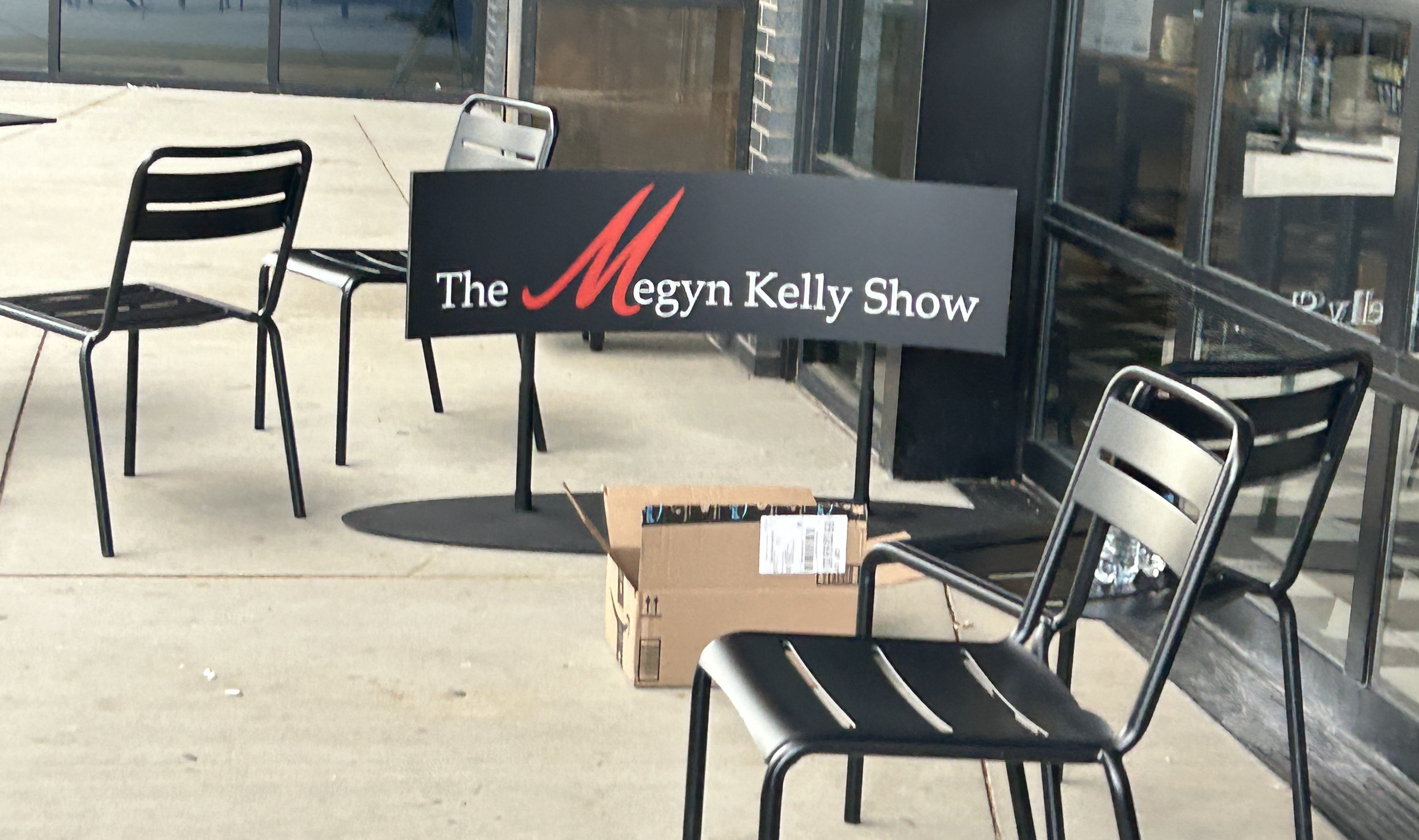
- The Megyn Kelly Show outside of MECCA Sports Bar and Grill one day after the 2024 RNC
- Genre: Political commentary; news; legal commentary; cultural commentary; true crime
- Format: Audio; video; radio
- Country of origin: United States
- Language: English

Creative team
- Created by: Megyn Kelly

Cast and voices
- Hosted by: Megyn Kelly

Production
- Length: 1–2 hours

Publication
- No. of episodes: 1,141 (As of September 07, 2025)
- Original release: September 27, 2020 – present
- Provider: Devil May Care Media
- Updates: Monday–Friday

Related
- Related shows: AM Update; MK True Crime; Next Up with Mark Halperin; The Nerve with Maureen Callahan; After Party with Emily Jashinsky; Spot On with Link Lauren
- Website: www.megynkelly.com/topic/full-episodes/

The Megyn Kelly Show is a news and political podcast and radio program hosted by American journalist Megyn Kelly. The program is produced by Devil May Care Media, an independent media company founded by Kelly in 2020. It airs on SiriusXM’s Triumph channel and in podcast format.

== History ==
The show launched as an audio-only podcast in September 2020 under Devil May Care Media. In 2021, it partnered with SiriusXM to expand into a live, daily radio program and video broadcast.

By 2025, The Megyn Kelly Show had grown into one of the most popular right-leaning podcasts in the United States. According to data from the media tracker The Righting, the program ranked as the third-largest conservative podcast in early 2025, trailing only those hosted by Ben Shapiro and Jordan Peterson. On the Castbox platform, subscriptions rose 176 percent year-over-year in the first quarter of 2025, reaching more than 134,000.

In Edison Research’s Q2 2025 Top 50 Podcasts in the U.S. rankings, The Megyn Kelly Show entered the Top 20 for the first time, placing nineteenth among weekly podcast consumers.

=== Split with Donald Trump (2026) ===
On March 2, 2026, Megyn Kelly broke with the Trump administration over the 2026 Iran war, questioning whether American servicemembers had died in service of U.S. interests. "No one should have to die for a foreign country," Kelly said, adding, "I don't think those four servicemembers died for the United States. I think they died for Iran or for Israel. This is clearly Israel's war."

In a phone interview with Rachael Blade of The Inner Circle later that day, Trump declared that both Kelly and Tucker Carlson, another right wing commentator who criticized Trump's Iran policy, "aren't MAGA". On the show, Kelly would also defend recently departed former National Counterterrorism Center head Joe Kent amid the Trump Administration's efforts to pursue an investigation against him. On the March 20, 2026 episode of The Megyn Kelly Show, Kent would appear in person as a guest, where he expressed no regrets for his decision to break with the Trump Administration over the Iran War and feared retaliation. In addition, Kent also alleged to Kelly that the Trump Administration had not done enough to investigate the assassination of Charlie Kirk.

== Format ==
Episodes feature Kelly’s commentary on current events, along with interviews and discussions on media, legal, cultural, and political issues. Recurring segments include “Kelly’s Court,” which focuses on legal analysis and trial coverage. Legal experts and attorneys who have frequently appeared on the show include Dave Aronberg, Mark Geragos, Alan Dershowitz, David Freiheit, Arthur Aidala, Mark Eiglarsh, and Jonna Spilbor.

== Expansion ==
In March 2025, Kelly announced the launch of MK Media, a podcast and digital network designed to host additional programs. The initial lineup included:

- Next Up with Mark Halperin, hosted by journalist and author Mark Halperin.
- The Nerve with Maureen Callahan, hosted by columnist Maureen Callahan.
- Spot On with Link Lauren, hosted by political commentator and influencer Link Lauren.

Later in 2025, MK Media introduced additional programming, including After Party with Emily Jashinsky and MK True Crime, a channel focused on trial coverage, true crime programming, and legal commentary.

== Production ==
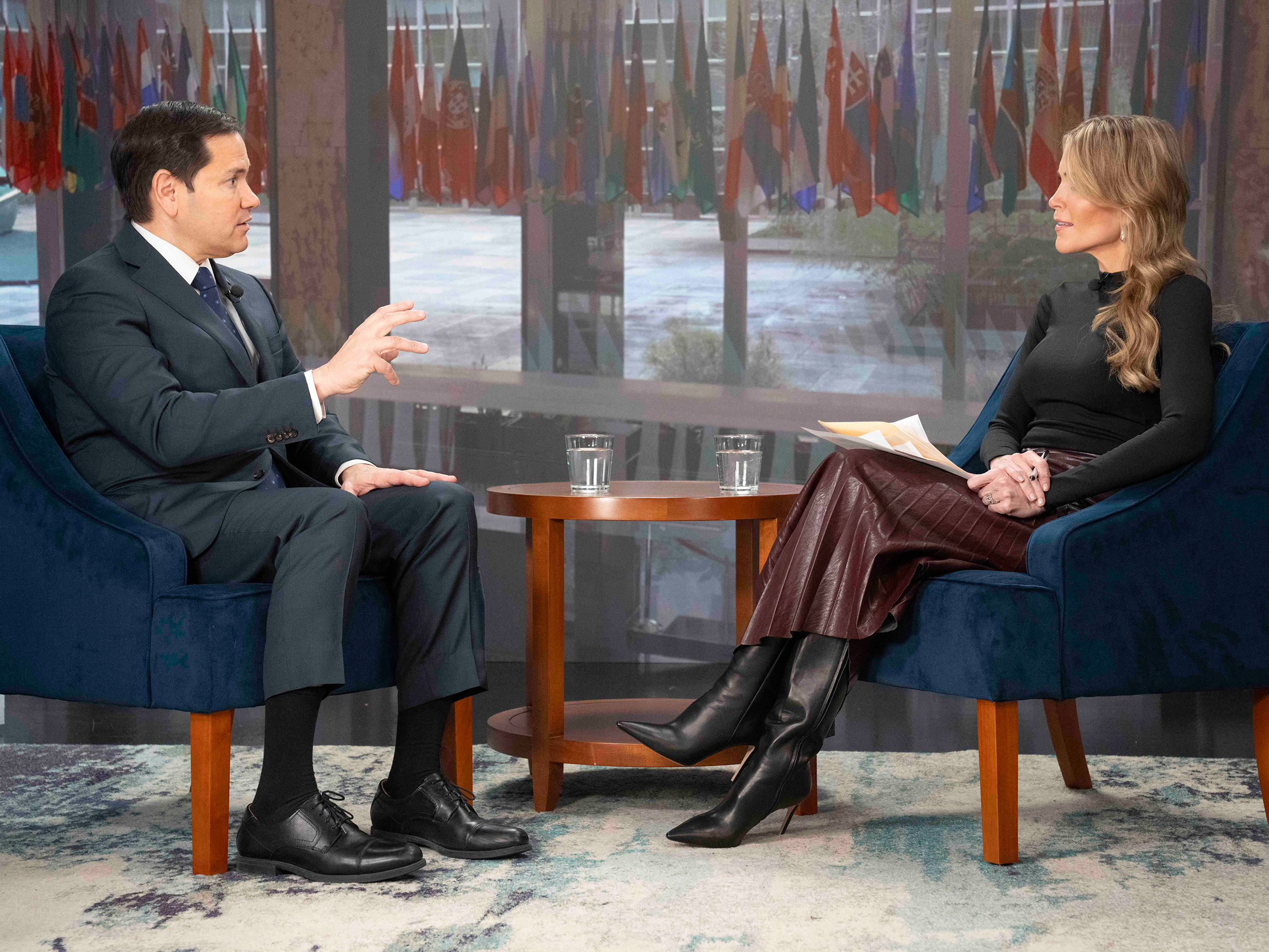
Megyn Kelly interviewing Secretary of State Marco Rubio on The Megyn Kelly Show in January 2025

The Megyn Kelly Show is produced by Devil May Care Media. The podcast originates mainly from Connecticut but also often from Midtown Manhattan. It airs on SiriusXM’s Triumph channel and is available on podcast platforms and YouTube. Steve Krakauer, executive producer of The Megyn Kelly Show, also oversees programming for MK Media.

== See also ==
- Political podcast
- List of daily news podcasts
