= Megyn Kelly =

American political commentator and journalist (born 1970)

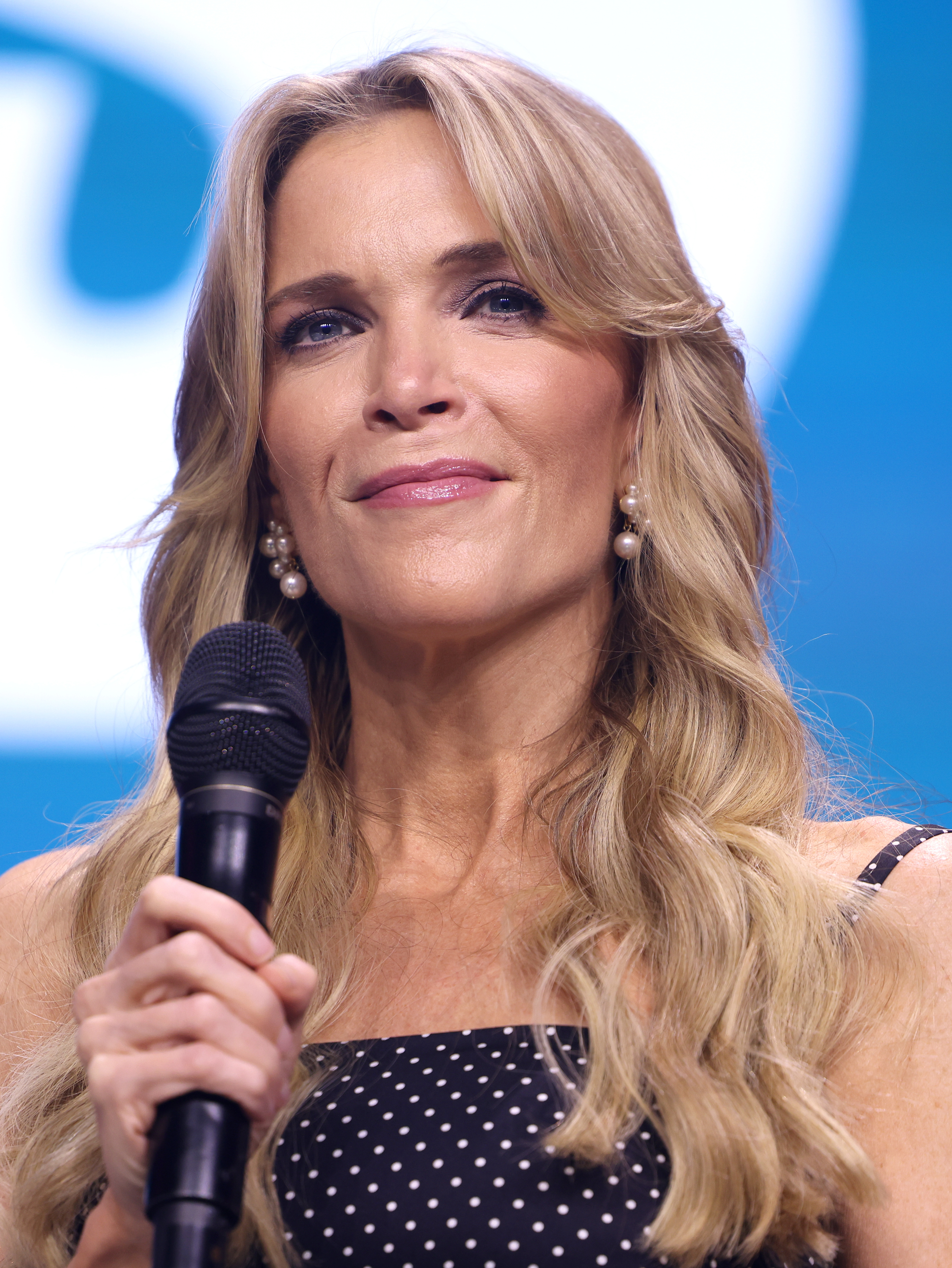
- Kelly in 2025
- Born: Megyn Marie Kelly; November 18, 1970 (age 56); Champaign, Illinois, U.S.
- Other name: Megyn Kendall
- Education: Syracuse University (BA); Albany Law School (JD)
- Occupations: Talk show host; political commentator
- Years active: 2003–present
- Employers: WJLA-TV (2003–2004); Fox News (2004–2017); NBC (2017–2019); SiriusXM (2021–present)
- Notable work: Sunday Night with Megyn Kelly; Megyn Kelly Today; The Kelly File; America Live; The Megyn Kelly Show
- Political party: Independent (2008–present)
- Spouses: Daniel Kendall (m. 2001; div. 2006); Douglas Brunt (m. 2008)
- Children: 3
- Website: megynkelly.com

Megyn Marie Kelly (/ˈmeɪɡən/; born November 18, 1970) is an American journalist, attorney, political commentator, and media personality. She hosts The Megyn Kelly Show, a talk show and podcast that airs daily on SiriusXM's Triumph channel and has over 4 million subscribers on YouTube. Kelly previously worked at Fox News from 2004 to 2017, where she hosted programs including America Live and The Kelly File, and at NBC News from 2017 to 2018, where she anchored Megyn Kelly Today. In 2025, she launched MK Media, a podcast and video network featuring commentary and news programs from independent creators. She was named one of Time's 100 most influential people of 2014 and 2025.

During her time at Fox News, Kelly hosted America Live from 2010 to 2013 and co-anchored America's Newsroom with Bill Hemmer. She also moderated several presidential primary debates during the 2016 and 2024 election cycles. Her show The Kelly File, which aired from 2013 to 2017, focused on breaking news and political events and was one of the network's top-rated programs. After leaving Fox News in January 2017, Kelly joined NBC News to host Megyn Kelly Today. She left NBC in January 2019 and later transitioned to independent media with her podcast and online platforms.

== Early life and education ==
Kelly was born on November 18, 1970, in Champaign, Illinois, to Edward Francis Kelly, Ed.D., who taught in the School of Education at the State University of New York at Albany, and Linda (née DeMaio), a homemaker. She grew up with an older sister, Suzanne (1964–2022) and an older brother, Pete (born c. 1965). She is of Italian and German descent on her mother's side and Irish descent on her father's. She was raised Catholic. Her father died of a heart attack in 1985 when she was 15 years old. She also has a step-sister and a step-brother from her mother's second marriage to Peter Kirwan.

Kelly attended Tecumseh Elementary School in suburban Syracuse, New York. When she was nine, her family moved to Delmar, New York, a suburb of Albany, where she attended Bethlehem Central High School. After high school, she studied political science at Syracuse University, graduating in 1992 with a Bachelor of Arts. She then attended Albany Law School, where she was an editor of the Albany Law Review. She graduated in 1995 with a Juris Doctor.

Kelly was an associate attorney in the Chicago office of law firm Bickel & Brewer LLP. In fall 1996, she co-wrote an article, "The Conflicting Roles of Lawyer as Director", for the American Bar Association's journal, Litigation. She later worked at Jones Day Law Firm for nine years, where one of her clients was the credit bureau Experian.

== Media career ==
=== Early career ===
In 2003, Kelly moved to Washington, D.C., where she was hired by the ABC affiliate WJLA-TV as a general assignment reporter. She covered national and local events, including live coverage of the confirmation hearings for U.S. Supreme Court Justice Samuel Alito and Chief Justice John Roberts, the retirement of Justice Sandra Day O'Connor, the death of Chief Justice William Rehnquist, and the 2004 presidential election. CNN president Jonathan Klein later said he regretted not hiring Kelly as a reporter at the beginning of her career, because she was "the one talent you'd want to have from somewhere else".

=== 2004–2017: Fox News ===
In 2004, Kelly applied for a job at Fox News. She contributed legal segments for Special Report with Brit Hume and hosted her own legal segment, Kelly's Court, during Weekend Live. She appeared in a weekly segment on The O'Reilly Factor and occasionally filled in for Greta Van Susteren on On the Record, where most of her reporting focused on legal and political matters. She occasionally contributed as an anchor, but more often as a substitute anchor on weekends. On February 1, 2010, Kelly began hosting her own two-hour afternoon show, America Live, which replaced The Live Desk. She was a guest panelist on Fox News' late-night satire program Red Eye w/ Greg Gutfeld. In 2010, viewership for America Live increased by 20%, averaging 1,293,000 viewers, and increased by 4% in the 25–54 age demographic, averaging 268,000 viewers. In December 2010, Kelly hosted a New Year's Eve special with Bill Hemmer.

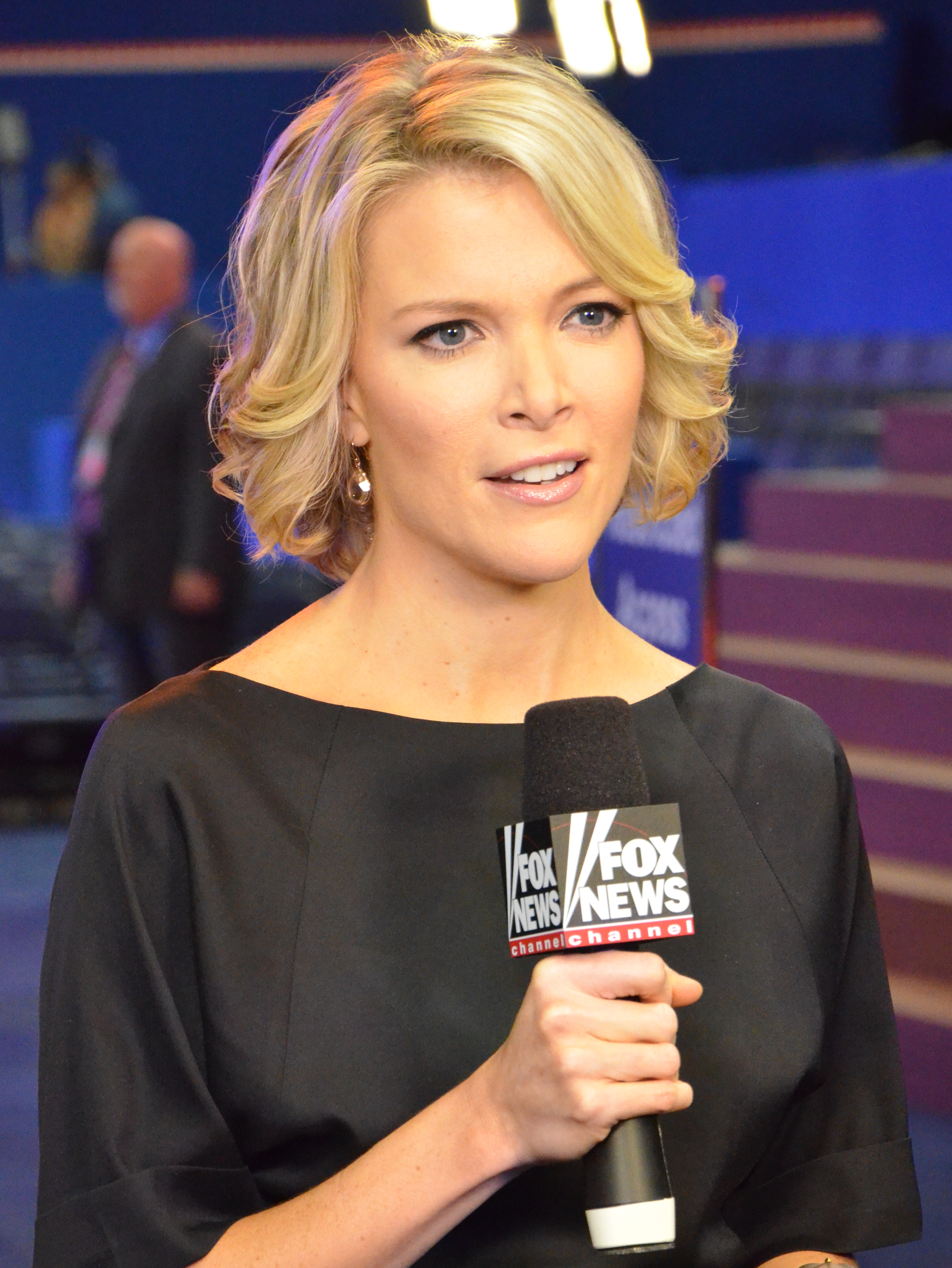
Kelly reporting during Fox's 2012 Republican National Convention coverage

Kelly received media attention for her coverage of the results of the 2012 United States presidential election. On election night, Fox News' decision desk projected that Obama would win the state of Ohio along with a second term after part of the results had been released. Republican operative Karl Rove objected to this projection, whereupon Kelly - with camera following - dramatically walked backstage to the decision desk and spoke with them; she also asked Rove, "Is this just math that you do as a Republican to make yourself feel better? Or is this real?" Kelly left America Live in July 2013 and took maternity leave. That October she began hosting a new nightly program, The Kelly File. The Kelly File was occasionally the channel's ratings leader, topping The O'Reilly Factor.

In December 2013, Kelly commented about a Slate article on The Kelly File: "For all you kids watching at home, Santa just is white, but this person is just arguing that maybe we should also have a black Santa", adding, "But Santa is what he is, and just so you know, we're just debating this because someone wrote about it." Kelly also said that Jesus was a white man later in the segment. Soon after, Jon Stewart, Stephen Colbert, Rachel Maddow, Josh Barro, and others satirized her remarks. Two days later, she said on the air that her original comments were "tongue-in-cheek", and that the skin color of Jesus is "far from settled". In June 2015, Kelly interviewed Jim Bob Duggar and Michelle Duggar of 19 Kids and Counting regarding their son Josh Duggar's alleged molestation of five girls in 2002. She later interviewed two of their daughters, Jill and Jessa. This show's Nielsen national estimates ratings of 3.09 million viewers, above its average 2.11 million, ranked with the 3.2 million for the Malaysia Airlines Flight 17 shootdown coverage and 7.3 million for the Ferguson riots coverage.

In the Republican Party presidential debate on August 6, 2015, Kelly asked then-presidential candidate Donald Trump whether a man of his temperament ought to be elected president, noting that he had called various women insulting names in the past. Kelly's moderating generated a range of media and political reactions, and her professionalism was crudely criticized by Trump. Kelly responded to Trump's criticism by saying she would not "apologize for doing good journalism". Trump declined to attend the Iowa January 28 debate that she moderated. After the debate and off-camera, Ted Cruz said that Kelly had referred to Trump off-camera as "Voldemort", though Fox News denied this. Bill Maher complimented Kelly as being "so much better" than the candidates who attended the January 28 debate and argued that she was a more viable candidate for the Republican nomination. According to reporting by The Atlantic, she had been "ordered" by Rupert Murdoch, then in control of Fox News, "to hit Trump hard".

In an interview with CBS News Sunday Morning, Kelly reflected that she was disappointed with the lack of support she received from coworker Bill O'Reilly and CNN, the latter airing a Trump event the same time as the debate. In April, at her request, Kelly met with Trump at Trump Tower, having "a chance to clear the air". The following month, after interviewing Trump and being met with mixed reception, she expressed interest in doing another one with him. In June, she criticized Trump for his claims against judge Gonzalo P. Curiel's impartiality. In October, a contentious discussion between Kelly and Newt Gingrich on The Kelly File regarding Trump's sexual comments in a 2005 audio recording gained widespread social media reaction.

In March 2016, it was announced that Kelly would host a one-hour prime time special on the Fox network wherein she would interview celebrities from the worlds of "politics, entertainment, and other areas of human interest". The special aired in May 2016, which was a sweeps month. It acquired 4.8 million viewers, but placed third in the ratings. Gabriel Sherman wrote of the stakes for Kelly as "high", elaborating that with Kelly being in the final year of her contract with Fox and having confirmed her ambitions, "[t]he special was essentially a public interview for her next job."

In July 2016, amid allegations of sexual harassment on the part of Fox News CEO Roger Ailes, Kelly was reported to have confirmed that she herself was also subjected to his harassment. Two days after the report, Ailes resigned from Fox News and his lawyer, Susan Estrich, publicly denied the charge. During her coverage of the 2016 Republican National Convention, Kelly and her choice of attire, a Ralph Lauren spaghetti strap dress, became the subject of misogynistic harassment from commenters on the Internet, particularly on Twitter. In a defense of Kelly, Jenavieve Hatch of The Huffington Post commented, "If you're a woman on national television reporting on a political event from hot, humid Cleveland, wearing a weather-appropriate outfit makes you the target of an endless stream of sexist commentary." In September 2016, it was reported that Kelly would be collaborating with Michael De Luca to produce Embeds, a scripted comedy about reporters covering politics, to be aired on a streaming service. Kelly appeared on the cover of the February 2016 issue of Vanity Fair. In 2016, she was an honoree for Variety's Power of Women for her addressing child abuse.

=== 2017–2018: NBC News ===
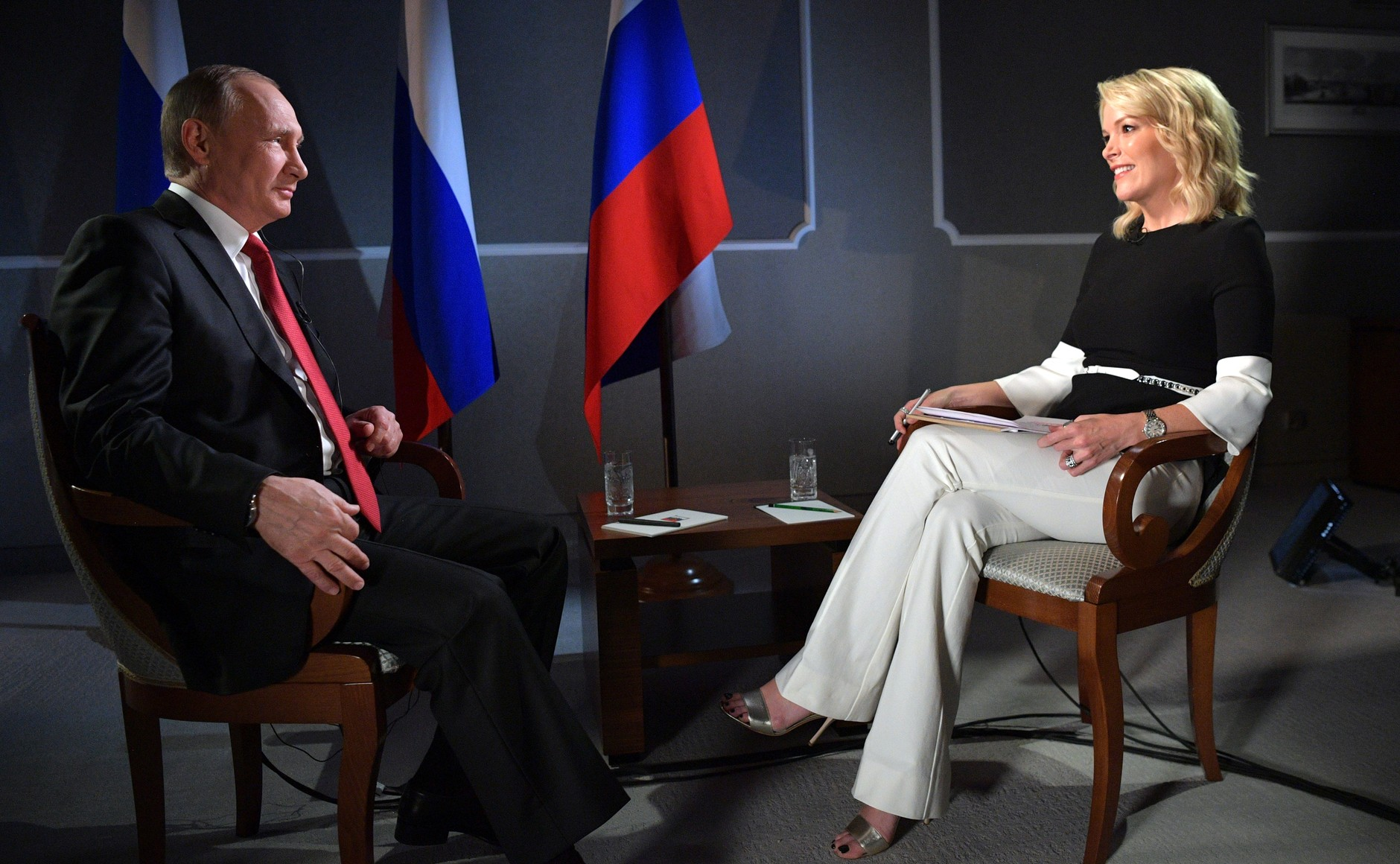
Kelly with Russian President Vladimir Putin, June 2017

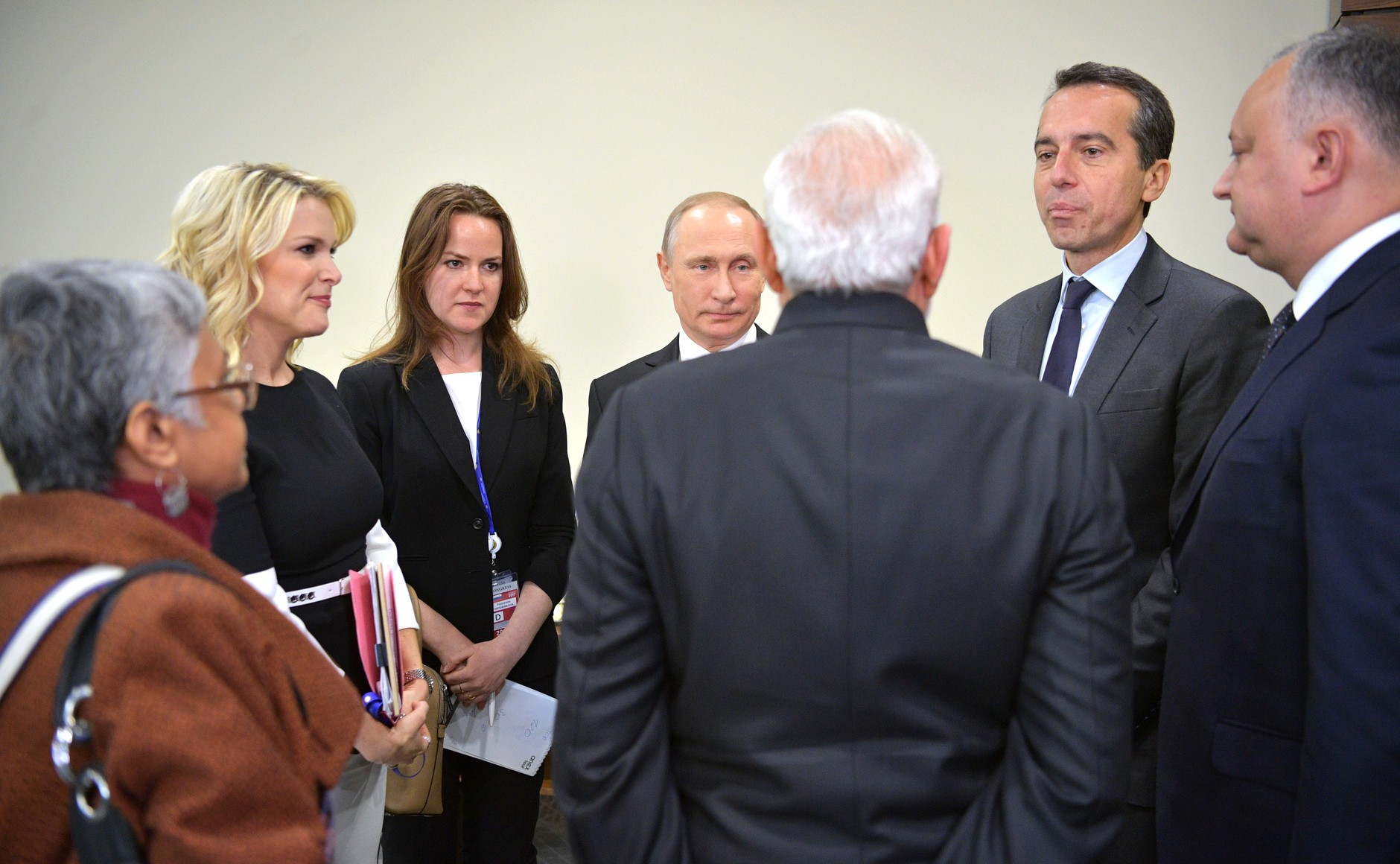
Kelly with Russian President Putin, Indian Prime Minister Narendra Modi, and Austrian Chancellor Christian Kern

In late 2016, with her Fox contract in its final months, Kelly was rumored to be actively considering moving to other news networks. In January 2017, The New York Times reported that she would leave Fox News for a "triple role" at NBC News, which would include roles hosting a daytime talk show and a forthcoming Sunday-night newsmagazine, as well as becoming a correspondent for major news events and political coverage. She departed Fox News on January 6, 2017, after the last episode of The Kelly File was aired. In January 2017 People, quoting an unspecified source, reported that Kelly remained under a non-compete clause with Fox until July 2017, which would prevent her from working for a competitor until the clause expired, unless it would be canceled prior.

On June 2, 2017, Kelly interviewed Russian president Vladimir Putin, first in a panel discussion she moderated at the St. Petersburg International Economic Forum and later in a one-on-one interview for the premiere episode of NBC's Sunday Night with Megyn Kelly, which aired June 4, 2017. Kelly's daytime talk show, Megyn Kelly Today, premiered in September 2017.

Kelly was paid reportedly between $15 million and $20 million a year at NBC. After an initial run of eight episodes in the summer of 2017, NBC announced Sunday Night with Megyn Kelly would return in spring 2018 after a hiatus for football and the Winter Olympics, but only periodically. However, this return never materialized. Instead, Kelly continued to report stories for Dateline NBC during the summer of 2018, continuing her work for the show which she joined in 2017.

On October 23, 2018, Kelly was criticized for on-air remarks she made on Megyn Kelly Today related to the appropriateness of blackface as part of Halloween costumes. She recollected that "when I was a kid, that was okay as long as you were dressing up like a character", and defended Luann de Lesseps's use of skin darkening spray to wear a Diana Ross Halloween costume. After receiving backlash for her comments, Kelly issued an internal email apologizing for the remarks later that day. Three days later, NBC canceled Megyn Kelly Today. It had been reported that Kelly was considering ending the program to focus on her role as a correspondent. Her employment was terminated on January 11, 2019, and she was paid the $30 million due for the remainder of her contract.

=== 2020–present: Independent media ===
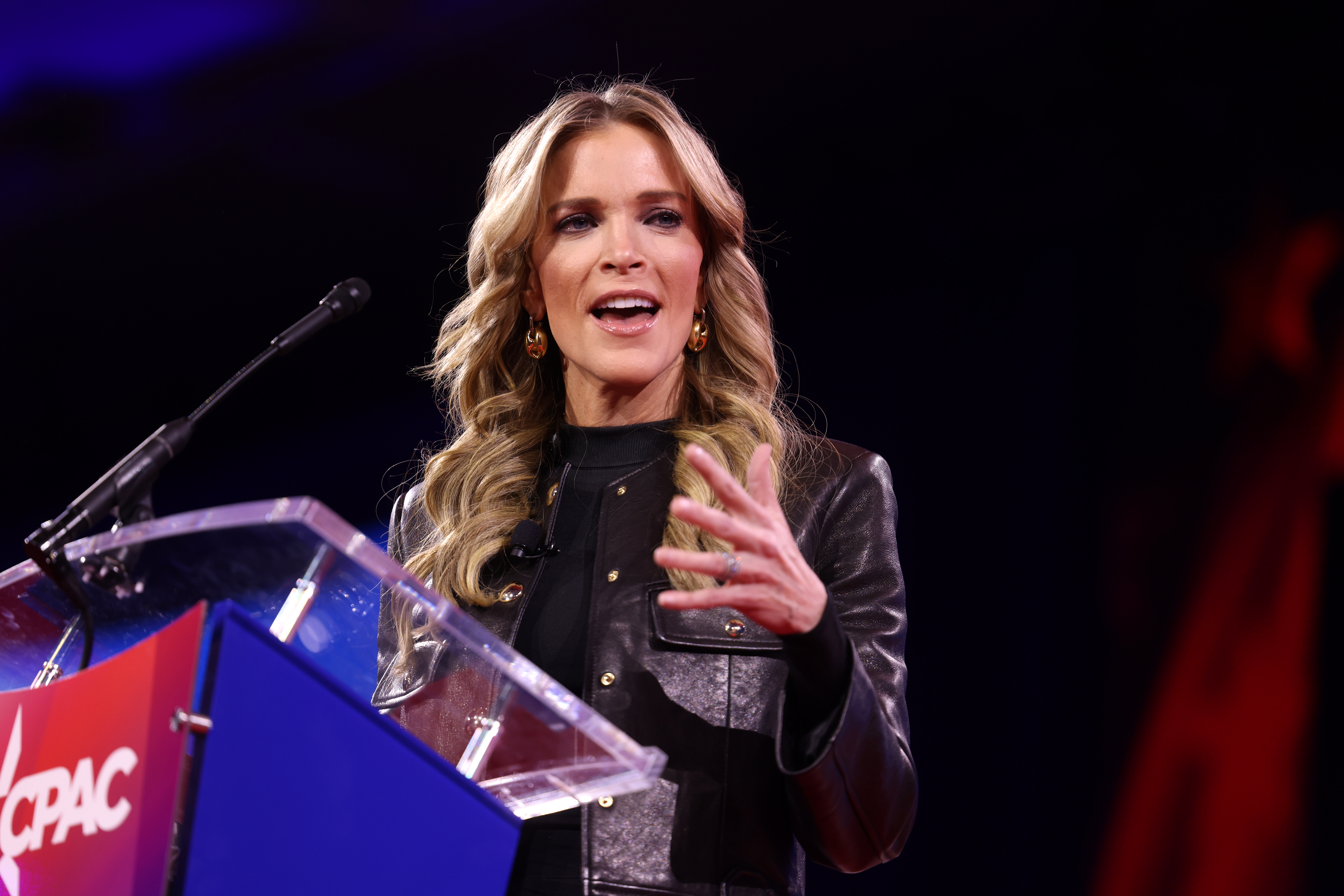
Kelly speaking at the 2025 Conservative Political Action Conference (CPAC) at the Gaylord National Resort & Convention Center in National Harbor, Maryland

Kelly announced the launch of Devil May Care Media, her media production company, on September 10, 2020, with a podcast, The Megyn Kelly Show. Its first episode premiered on September 28, 2020. On July 6, 2021, it was announced that the podcast would move to SiriusXM on September 7, 2021, to broadcast weekdays at 12 noon ET on the talk radio channel Triumph, along with a video simulcast available to SiriusXM subscribers.

Since transitioning to independent media, The Megyn Kelly Show has experienced significant growth. In July 2023, the show's YouTube channel attracted 116.8 million views, surpassing the viewership of major news outlets during the same period, including NBC News (78 million) and CBS News (83 million). As of November 2025, Kelly's YouTube channel alone has over 4 million subscribers, and it has become one of the top ten podcasts in the U.S. Despite running with a small team, her show has gained significant traction, positioning her as a prominent figure in the digital media space.

On December 6, 2023, Kelly returned to the moderator desk to co-host the fourth Republican primary debate on NewsNation, alongside Elizabeth Vargas and Eliana Johnson. This marked her first return to moderating a presidential debate since her time at Fox News, where she famously moderated the first Republican Party presidential debate in 2015. The debate, which was hosted by independent media figures, was part of the Republican National Committee's move toward embracing alternative media platforms over traditional establishment networks. The event took place without the participation of Donald Trump, the leading Republican candidate at the time.

On November 4, 2024, the day before the 2024 presidential election, Kelly publicly endorsed Donald Trump at a rally in Pittsburgh. In her speech, she expressed support for his policies on women's rights, border security, immigration, and transgender athletes in women's sports, stating that he would be a "protector" of women. Afterward, Kelly posted a selfie with Trump on X, captioned, "God bless him. Go vote for him!" While Kelly had previously clashed with Trump during the 2016 campaign, when he referred to her as "nasty" following a widely publicized debate exchange, her endorsement in 2024 revealed a stark change in their relationship.

Kelly attended the Trump's second inauguration in January 2025, and delivered remarks on stage at his rally the night before. On February 18, 2025, Kelly announced the launch of a second podcast, AM Update with Megyn Kelly, which premiered on February 19. Unlike The Megyn Kelly Show, which features guest discussions and debates, AM Update follows a daily digest format, summarizing major headlines. On March 10, 2025, Kelly won the IHeartRadio podcast award for Best Political Podcast.

In March 2025, Kelly launched MK Media, a podcast and video network focused on news and entertainment. Its initial lineup included Next Up with Mark Halperin, The Nerve with Maureen Callahan, and Spot On with Link Lauren, with new episodes airing multiple times per week. The network expanded on Kelly’s existing media presence, including The Megyn Kelly Show and AM Update, with longtime producer Steve Krakauer overseeing production. Additional shows were reported to be in development. With the first additional show After Party with Emily Jashinsky launching in June 2025. On May 6, 2025, Kelly's podcast ranked 3rd in top right-wing podcasts by subscribers for Q1. Her podcast had the most YOY % growth at 176%. She is also the only female in the top 10.

==== Split with Trump in 2026 ====
On March 2, 2026, Kelly split with the Trump Administration over the 2026 Iran war, notably questioning why U.S. military members died in a conflict which mainly involved Iran and Israel. In a phone interview with Rachael Blade of The Inner Circle later that day, Trump declared that both Kelly and Tucker Carlson, another right wing commentator who criticized Trump's Iran policy, "aren't MAGA".

Two weeks later, Kelly defended former National Counterterrorism Center head Joe Kent amid the Trump Administration's efforts to pursue an investigation against him. On the March 20, 2026 episode of The Megyn Kelly Show, Kent appeared as a guest, informing Kelly that he has no regrets for his decision to break with the Trump Administration over the Iran War and feared retaliation. He also alleged that the Trump Administration had not done enough to investigate the assassination of Charlie Kirk.

When Russell Brand was sentenced to a decade in prison for rape in late 2026, Kelly said, "I don't believe the charges, and I don’t have to believe them just because the jury came through with the opposite conclusion. ... I feel indignant that this obvious conservative stalwart has been targeted."

== Political views ==
=== Political affiliation ===
Kelly has been a registered independent voter since 2008, and told Variety in 2015 that she had voted for both Democrats and Republicans.

In April 2024, Kelly revealed that she voted for Donald Trump in the 2020 presidential election and would vote for him again in 2024 despite their turbulent relationship in the past. She explained that her decision was driven particularly by issues like transgender issues and cultural changes that she said were affecting her children. Kelly stated that her vote was based on principles rather than personal preference, emphasizing her desire to protect traditional values and preserve fundamental freedoms.

In 2025, Kelly opened up about her shift in political standing over the years on The Megyn Kelly Show, stating that:

When I was at Fox and then for that year at NBC, I was more in the center. I was like definitely center-right. Now I think I'm pretty conservative. I mean, I just am now. I mean, the earth has shifted such that I think I have to say, yes, by today's standards, you'd call me conservative. But that's thanks to them. What they did to me, they were vicious. They're complete assholes. Their woke ideology completely radicalized me against them. And I love that. It empowered me in a way that allowed me to see the truth about them. That was very helpful to me. I wouldn't undo it if I could because it really helped me understand who I was dealing with over there.

=== Transgender issues ===
In 2023, Kelly said that her opinion had shifted from supporting "preferred pronouns" to opposing them, citing concerns about their connection to gender-affirming care for minors. She argued that such policies harmed women's rights and children's safety. Kelly stated she would no longer use preferred pronouns but would still approach transgender individuals with empathy. She also criticized the inclusion of transgender women in women's spaces and sports, as well as medical intervention for transgender youth.

In 2023, Kelly referred to inclusion of transgender women in women's organizations, including sororities and women's sports teams, as "woke ideology being thrust down your throats in the name of tolerance" and called transgender women "biological men". She has falsely asserted that drag includes "the grooming of young children" and called transgender healthcare "a weird form of conversion therapy".

=== Gun policy ===
In response to the Minneapolis Catholic school shooting in August 2025, Kelly said on The Megyn Kelly Show that broad gun reform would be ineffective in the United States given the prevalence of firearms and constitutional protections under the Second Amendment. She stated that "the bad guys are the ones who get them. You would just be disarming the law-abiding ones", saying that individuals intent on committing mass violence would either obtain guns illegally or find other means to carry out attacks. Kelly said she supported targeted interventions for individuals with serious mental health concerns, adding that "putting red flags all over people who have serious mental health histories and trying to take their guns away, I'm with you. I'm actually more to the left on that issue than a lot of my conservative friends."

Kelly has called for increased armed security at schools and adjacent institutions, stating that "we need more good guys with guns on soft targets", and called for improvements in the mental health system. She has also criticized the media and political discussions that focus primarily on gun control, saying that such debates distract from practical measures that would protect children.

=== 2026 Iran war ===
On the March 2, 2026, episode of The Megyn Kelly Show, Kelly criticized Trump's policy of military intervention against Iran, which triggered backlash from Trump. In response to the deaths of U.S. service members in the 2026 Iran war, Kelly stated, "No one should have to die for a foreign country", that "I don't think those four service members died for the United States. I think they died for Iran or for Israel", and that "This is clearly Israel's war."

=== Immigration issues ===
On the June 25, 2026 episode of The Megyn Kelly Show, Kelly criticized Haitian immigrants in the US for not assimilating to American culture and said "We don't want you!" as well as "We don't care if you're offended. Get out! Go home! Go back to fucking Haiti!" These comments were made as a reaction to a Supreme Court decision allowing the Trump administration to take away Temporary Protected Status for Haiti and Syria.

== Writing ==
In February 2016, Kelly signed an agreement with HarperCollins to write an autobiography scheduled for release later that year, in a deal worth more than $10 million. The book, titled Settle for More, was released on November 15, 2016.

== Accolades ==
- In 2009, Kelly received an award from Childhelp for her work as a Fox News anchor covering the subject of child abuse.
- Kelly received an Alumni Achievement Award from the Albany Law School in 2010 for her 15th class reunion.
- She was in Time's list of the 100 most influential people in 2014 and 2025.
- On September 26, 2015, Kelly was inducted into the Hall of Fame at Bethlehem Central High School, her alma mater.
- On March 10, 2025, Kelly won the IHeartRadio podcast award for best political podcast.

== In popular culture ==
=== Bombshell ===
Bombshell, a 2019 film about Roger Ailes' sexual misconduct and resignation from Fox News, was released on December 13, with Charlize Theron portraying Kelly, a role that earned an Oscar nomination. Kelly said she was not consulted for the film, but after viewing it, she hosted a roundtable with others involved, confirming and disputing parts of the film and calling it an emotional experience.

=== Mr. Birchum ===
In early 2023, Kelly said that she had to join SAG-AFTRA for an upcoming secret project. On November 30, 2023, she said on her show that she would star alongside Danny Trejo, Roseanne Barr, and Adam Carolla in Mr. Birchum, a Daily Wire adult animated comedy series which debuted in early 2024.

== Personal life ==
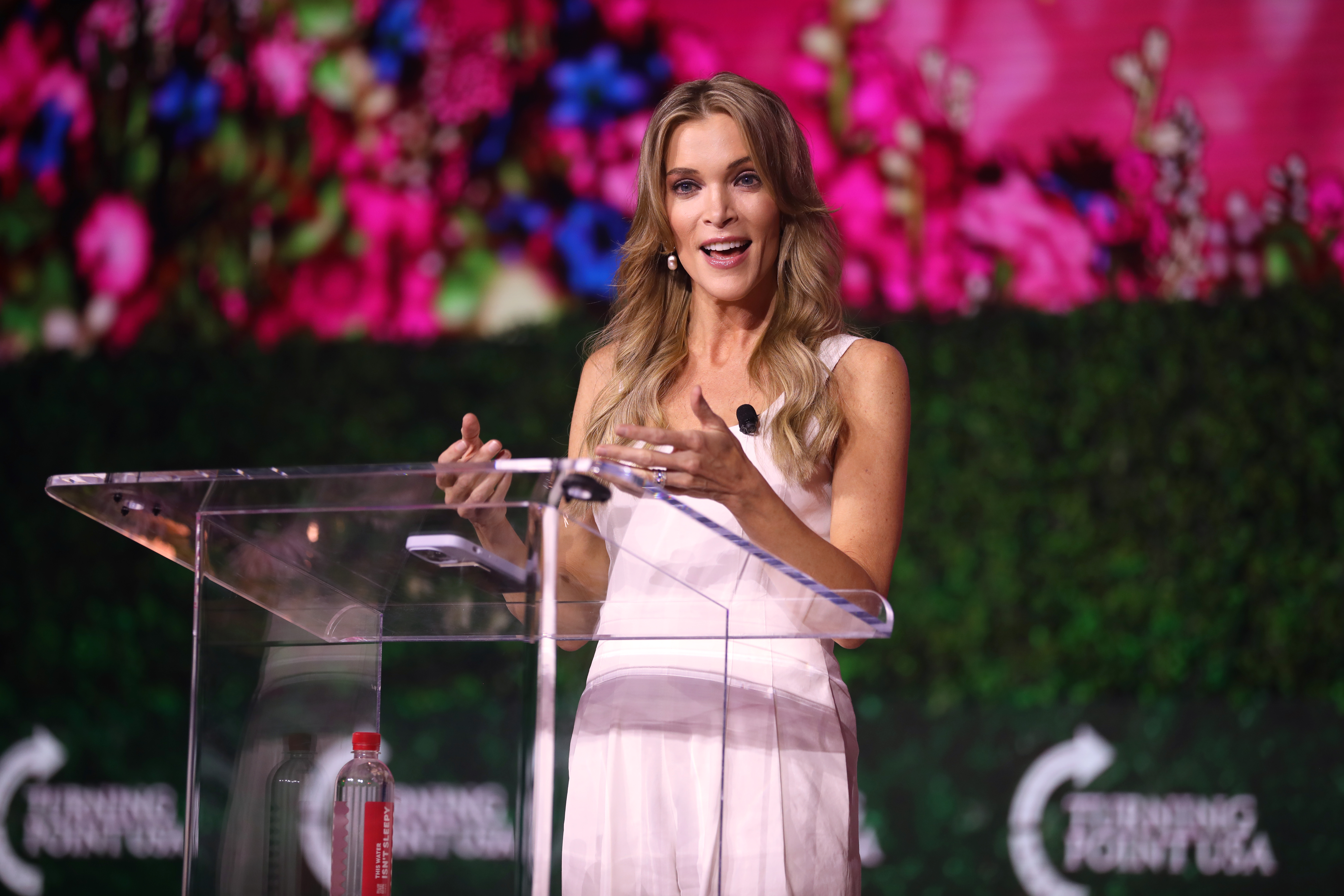
Kelly speaking at the 2024 Young Women's Leadership Summit San Antonio, Texas

Kelly was married in 2001 to Daniel Kendall, an anesthesiologist. They divorced in 2006.

In 2008 Kelly married Douglas Brunt, then president and CEO of the cybersecurity firm Authentium, Inc., who later became a full-time writer and a podcaster. The couple has three children all conceived through in vitro fertilization.

Kelly is a lifelong Roman Catholic. She has appeared at a fundraiser for the conservative group Moms for Liberty and Turning Point USA's Young Women's Leadership Summit. She has stated that she has Raynaud syndrome.
