= America Live with Megyn Kelly =

- Genre: News program
- Presented by: Megyn Kelly
- Country of origin: United States
- Original language: English

Production
- Camera setup: Multi-camera
- Running time: 120 minutes

Original release
- Network: Fox News Channel
- Release: February 1, 2010 – September 27, 2013

America Live with Megyn Kelly is an American news program that aired on the Fox News Channel from February 1, 2010, to September 27, 2013, and was hosted by Megyn Kelly, former co-host of America's Newsroom. It aired 1:00–3:00 PM Eastern Standard Time Monday through Friday.

== About the show ==
America Live was a live news program in which host Megyn Kelly delivered the top news and debates regarding controversial social and political issues. Kelly also discussed legal issues in the United States, ranging from celebrity legal disputes, to government-related court cases, and more unusual incidents (e.g., intoxicated people calling 911 asking for a boyfriend). America Live featured a signature segment, Kelly's Court, which Kelly reprised from her previous role in the America's Newsroom program. In Kelly's Court, the anchor and lawyer discusses newsmaking legal disputes with a legal panel and declares her opinion regarding what should and is likely to occur via the judicial system.

Fox News reporter Shannon Bream often anchored the program during Kelly's absences. Rick Folbaum and Juliet Huddy co-anchored the program occasionally, and Martha MacCallum has also served as a fill-in anchor for the show.

On July 3, 2013, Megyn Kelly announced on air that she would be taking maternity leave and no longer hosting America Live. She also revealed that upon her return in the fall, she would be moving to a prime-time show, The Kelly File, beginning Monday, October 7, 2013. From July 4, 2013, to September 27, 2013, the show was hosted by a rotation of Shannon Bream, Martha MacCallum, Alisyn Camerota, Gregg Jarrett and Heather Childers. Fox News announced on September 25, 2013, that America Live would be cancelled to make room for one hour of America's News Headquarters and one hour of The Real Story with Gretchen Carlson.

Preceded by Happening Now	America Live; 1:00 PM – 3:00 PM	Succeeded by Studio B with Shepard Smith
