= Megyn Kelly Today =

Today-affiliated talk show hosted by Megyn Kelly (2017–2018)

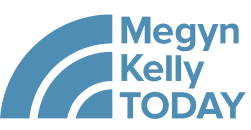
- Genre: Talk show
- Presented by: Megyn Kelly
- No. of seasons: 1
- No. of episodes: 282

Production
- Production locations: Studio 6-A, Rockefeller Center
- Camera setup: Multi-camera

Original release
- Network: NBC
- Release: September 25, 2017 – October 24, 2018

Related
- Today's Take

Megyn Kelly Today is an American daytime talk show that was broadcast by NBC. Premiering on September 25, 2017, it replaced Today's Take as the third hour of NBC's national morning show Today. The program was hosted by Megyn Kelly, who had joined NBC News earlier in the year after leaving Fox News, and was the second of two NBC News programs promised to Kelly upon her arrival, alongside her newsmagazine Sunday Night with Megyn Kelly.

Megyn Kelly Today received negative reviews upon its premiere, facing criticism for the quality of Kelly's hosting and her appropriateness as a daytime personality, as well as on-air interactions that proved controversial. On October 26, 2018, in the midst of backlash over remarks by Kelly on the program regarding blackface, and reports suggesting she wished to focus more on her role as an NBC News correspondent, NBC announced that the program had been canceled. Kelly ultimately departed NBC in January 2019.

== History ==
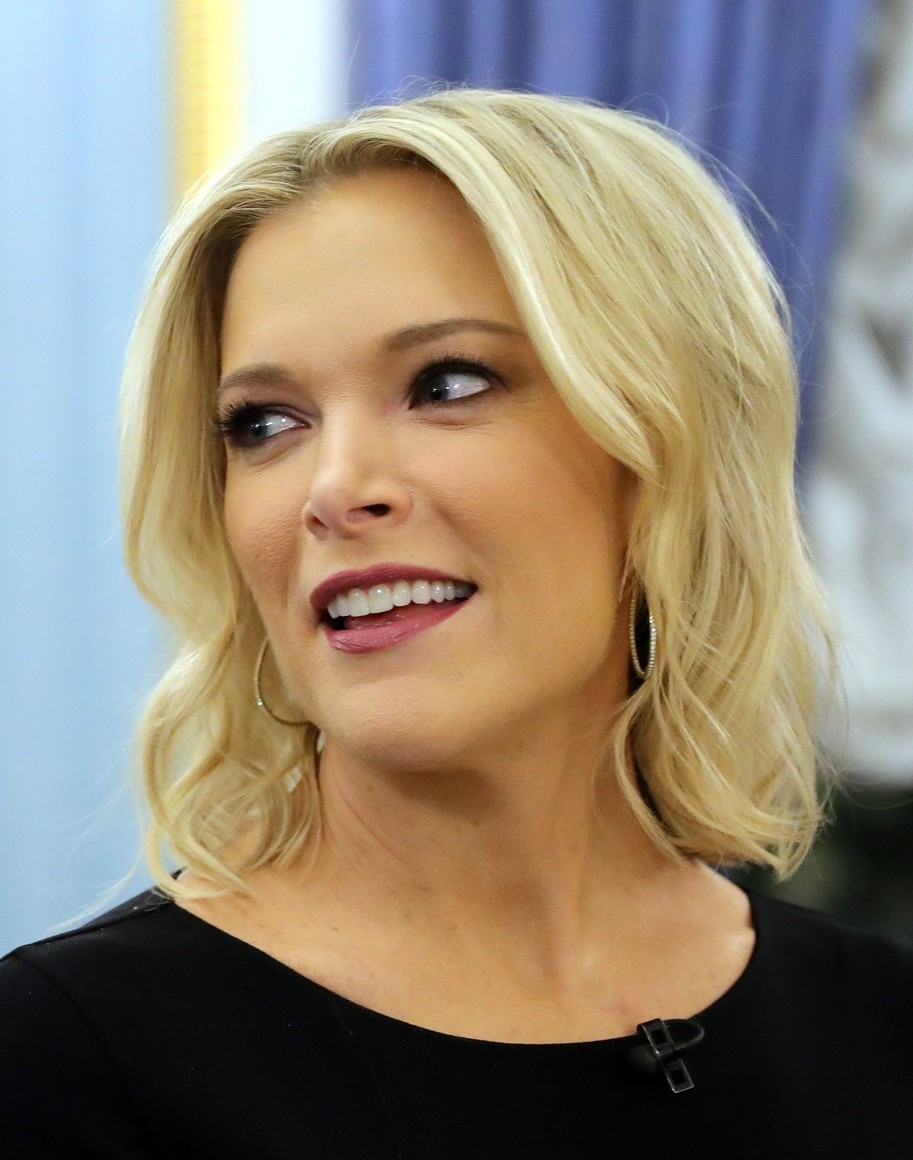
Megyn Kelly in Russia in March 2018

After it was announced in January 2017 that former Fox News anchor Megyn Kelly would move to NBC News and host a new daytime program, The New York Times reported on January 27, 2017, that NBC was planning to discontinue Today's Take, and schedule Kelly's new show at either 9 or 10 a.m. (either replacing Today's Take in its former timeslot, or in the latter scenario, displacing Today with Kathie Lee and Hoda to 9). It was reported that NBC staff had not yet determined whether Kelly's new program would be branded as part of Today or as a stand-alone program.

It was subsequently announced that her new show would be titled Megyn Kelly Today, and premiere on September 25, 2017, as a replacement for Today's Take. The new program is structured as a talk show with a studio audience. Critics noted that the program was likely intended as a more direct competitor to the syndicated talk show Live with Kelly and Ryan, with Megyn Kelly trying to convey a "softer" personality to contrast her Fox News reputation of being an aggressive journalist and interviewer.

== Reception ==
The first episode received negative reviews from critics, panning Kelly for her "awkward," "chilly" performance and failure to connect with the audience. The show attracted controversy during its first week of episodes, which included actress Debra Messing expressing regret for appearing on the program after Kelly joked about Will & Grace inspiring a fan to become gay as well as Kelly's questioning of Jane Fonda about her plastic surgery procedures. The incidents prompted widespread criticism of Kelly's daytime hosting abilities. The following week, Kelly again ignited controversy during a panel discussion following a mass shooting in Las Vegas, when Kelly interrupted and spoke over Tom Brokaw after he criticized the National Rifle Association, saying "Yep. Yep, got it. Gotta leave it at that, Tom. . . . We’re up against a hard break."

During the show's debut week, viewership was down 12 percent from the same time slot compared to the year prior; the second week brought in 24 percent fewer viewers, and the third week saw a 23 percent smaller audience. Additionally, the show trailed in the ratings behind Live with Kelly and Ryan. NBC personalities such as Al Roker, Savannah Guthrie, and Hoda Kotb appeared as co-hosts on various episodes in an attempt to bolster ratings. A month after the premiere, Julia Wallace wrote in USA Today that the show was "a disaster", but blamed NBC for trying to portray Kelly as an "almost comical" imitation of Kelly Ripa instead of tapping into the abilities that made her a success at Fox News.

Variety noted Megyn Kelly Today for its coverage and discussions of the Me Too movement, including allegations targeting fellow NBC personalities such as Matt Lauer.

=== Blackface controversy ===
During the October 23, 2018 episode, Kelly participated in a panel discussion on the appropriateness of blackface in Halloween costumes. During the segment—whose panel did not contain any African American participants—Kelly recollected that "Truly, you do get in trouble if you are a white person who puts on blackface for Halloween or a black person who put on whiteface for Halloween. When I was a kid, that was okay as long as you were dressing up as like a character", and added that "Luann de Lesseps wants to look like Diana Ross for one day, and I don't know how that got racist on Halloween."

Kelly's comments were widely interpreted as a defense of the practice, which is generally considered to be a derogatory caricature of African Americans. Critics likened Kelly's remarks to a previous incident during her tenure at Fox News Channel, where Kelly asserted that Jesus and Santa Claus were white.

Later that day, Kelly issued an internal email apologizing for the remarks, stating that "I realize now that such behavior is indeed wrong, and I am sorry", and that "I've never been a 'politically correct' kind of person — but I understand that we do need to be more sensitive in this day and age. Particularly on race and ethnicity issues which, far from being healed, have been exacerbated in our politics over the past year. This is a time for more understanding, love, sensitivity and honor, and I want to be part of that. I look forward to continuing that discussion."

Kelly opened the October 24 episode, which would eventually be the show's last, with a public apology, and joined African American journalists Amy Holmes and Roland Martin in a discussion over the controversies surrounding blackface. The same day, The Hollywood Reporter reported that Kelly had left the Creative Artists Agency, and had hired an attorney. The week's remaining episodes were replaced by encores.

== Cancellation ==
Alongside the blackface controversy, it was reported that Kelly had discussed ending the program so she could focus more on her role as an NBC News correspondent, but that the comments may have an impact on her overall future at the network. Viewership of Megyn Kelly Today had been stable, but not as high as that of Today's Take.

On October 26, 2018, NBC officially announced that Megyn Kelly Today had been canceled, and that its time slot would be assumed by other anchors. Kelly's attorney stated that her future with NBC News was to be determined. Kelly terminated her contract with NBC in January 2019.

After the program's cancellation, the Megyn Kelly Today set and studio were redressed for various other NBC specials and productions, including occasional audience-based episodes of Today with Hoda & Jenna and All In with Chris Hayes (MSNBC) before the COVID-19 pandemic, NBC News election coverage of Super Tuesday in March 2020, and then The Tonight Show Starring Jimmy Fallon from July 13, 2020, to March 22, 2021 while filming without an audience. In 2023, Studio 6-A was reconstructed for NBCUniversal's syndicated talk show The Kelly Clarkson Show.
