= American Predator =

2019 non-fiction book by Maureen Callahan

- Author: Maureen Callahan
- Language: English
- Genre: True crime
- Publisher: Viking Press
- Publication date: July 2, 2019
- Publication place: United States
- Pages: 304
- ISBN: 9780143129707
- OCLC: 1107698279

American Predator: The Hunt for the Most Meticulous Serial Killer of the 21st Century is a 2019 true crime book by Maureen Callahan. The book examines the life, crimes, and investigation of serial killer Israel Keyes, drawing on FBI interview transcripts, investigative files, and interviews with law enforcement officials.

== Background and content ==
Callahan’s book reconstructs the life and crimes of Israel Keyes, focusing on his methods of planning murders across multiple states and his use of buried “murder kits.” Drawing from FBI interrogation recordings and investigative records, the book details the abduction and murder of Samantha Koenig, the Currier murders in Vermont, and law enforcement efforts to identify additional victims.

The book also examines Keyes’s childhood in a fundamentalist religious community, his military service, and his interactions with investigators following his arrest in 2012.

== Critical reception ==
In The Washington Post, Dennis Drabelle wrote that the book reveals "the chilling playbook of a serial killer" and praised its detailed reconstruction of the investigation. The New York Journal of Books described the book as "a gripping and chilling look into how a serial killer operates in plain sight."
