= Maureen Callahan =

American writer and editor

- Born: New York, U.S.
- Education: School of Visual Arts (BA)
- Occupations: Podcast host, author, columnist
- Writing career
- Notable works: American Predator: The Hunt for the Most Meticulous Serial Killer of the 21st Century; Ask Not: The Kennedys and the Women They Destroyed
- Website: maureencallahan.net

Maureen Callahan (/mɔːˈriːn/; born December 20, 1971) is an American podcast host, author, and columnist for the Daily Mail, who writes opinion pieces regarding politics, pop culture, and current events.

== Early life and education ==
Callahan is of Irish American heritage and grew up in Long Beach on Long Island. She earned a Bachelor of Arts degree from the journalism program at the School of Visual Arts in New York City.

== Career ==
=== Journalism ===
Callahan began working for Sassy magazine and MTV at age 17. Music journalist Marc Spitz wrote about going to a Michael Jackson concert and sharing the experience of growing up in the 1990s with Callahan in his book Poseur: A Memoir of Downtown New York in the '90s.

She has written for Sassy, Spin, New York magazine, MTV, The New York Times Magazine, and Vanity Fair. She authored Champagne Supernovas: Kate Moss, Marc Jacobs, Alexander McQueen, and the '90s Renegades Who Remade Fashion, a 2014 non-fiction account of the fashion industry, and Poker Face: The Rise and Rise of Lady Gaga in 2010.

Callahan worked as a writer, editor, and later columnist for the New York Post from 2002 to September 2022. She has worked as a columnist for Daily Mail since October 2022.

She received an ASCAP Deems Taylor Award as co-author of "Don't Drink the Brown Water", a piece in Spin magazine about what led to riots and violence at Woodstock '99. Callahan was interviewed as part of Woodstock 99: Peace, Love, and Rage, a documentary produced by HBO.

In 2016, Irish America listed Callahan as one of its "Top 50 Power Women".

=== As an author ===
In 2019, she published the true crime book American Predator: The Hunt for The Most Meticulous Serial Killer of the 21st Century about Israel Keyes. It became an instant New York Times bestseller, a nominee for the Edgar Award for Best Fact Crime and winner of France's Grand prix de littérature policière.

In 2024, Callahan published Ask Not: The Kennedys and the Women They Destroyed. Ask Not became an instant New York Times bestseller and charted as #1 on the UK Sunday Times Bestsellers List upon release. It also became an Irish Times bestseller. Along with Megyn Kelly, who called it "the book of the summer" in June 2024, Ask Not has been listed as a Top 20 Summer read by Town & Country, The Sunday Independent, Glamour UK, and Mail on Sunday. The Observer praised the book as "a timely reminder of the dangers posed by men who crave power."

=== Podcast ===
In 2025, Callahan launched her podcast, The Nerve, following multiple appearances on The Megyn Kelly Show. The podcast is part of journalist and podcast host Megyn Kelly's MK Media network, in which Callahan discusses celebrity gossip, popular culture, and true crime.

== Bibliography ==
- Poker Face: The Rise and Rise of Lady Gaga. Hachette Books. 2010.
- Champagne Supernovas: Kate Moss, Marc Jacobs, Alexander McQueen, and the '90s Renegades Who Remade Fashion. Simon and Schuster. 2014.
- American Predator: The Hunt for The Most Meticulous Serial Killer of the 21st Century. Viking Press. 2019.
- Ask Not: The Kennedys and the Women They Destroyed. Mudlark. 2024.
