= Douglas Brunt =

American novelist and business executive (born 1971)

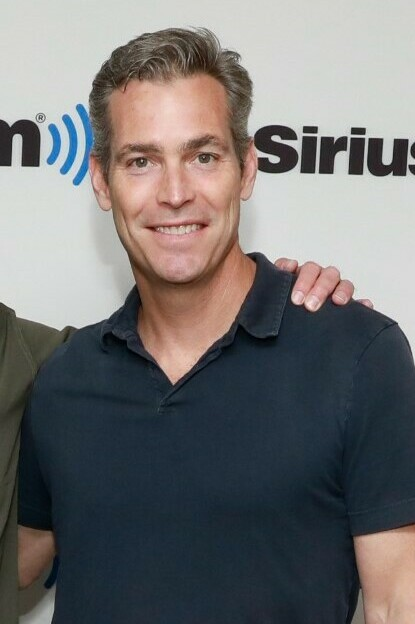
- Brunt in 2023
- Born: August 25, 1971 (age 55); Philadelphia, Pennsylvania, U.S.
- Education: Duke University (BA)
- Occupations: Writer, podcaster
- Employer(s): Self, SiriusXM
- Spouse: Megyn Kelly (m. 2008)
- Children: 3

Douglas Brunt (born August 25, 1971) is an American biographer, novelist, and podcast host with SiriusXM, and former president and CEO of the cybersecurity firm Authentium, Inc.

== Early life ==
Born in Philadelphia, Brunt is the son of Jacklyn Bray Brunt and Manly Yates Brunt Jr. Before graduating from Duke University, he attended The Haverford School.

== Early career ==
In 2001, he joined Authentium, Inc., an internet security firm, where he was president and CEO until 2011, when it sold its Command Antivirus division to Commtouch. Previously Brunt worked for Booz Allen Hamilton. He was a member of the Metro New York chapter of the Young Presidents' Organization.

== Writing career ==
Brunt has published three novels. His first nonfiction book, released in 2023, about the disappearance and death of Rudolf Diesel, was called by the Wall Street Journal "well-researched and well–written".

== Broadcasting ==
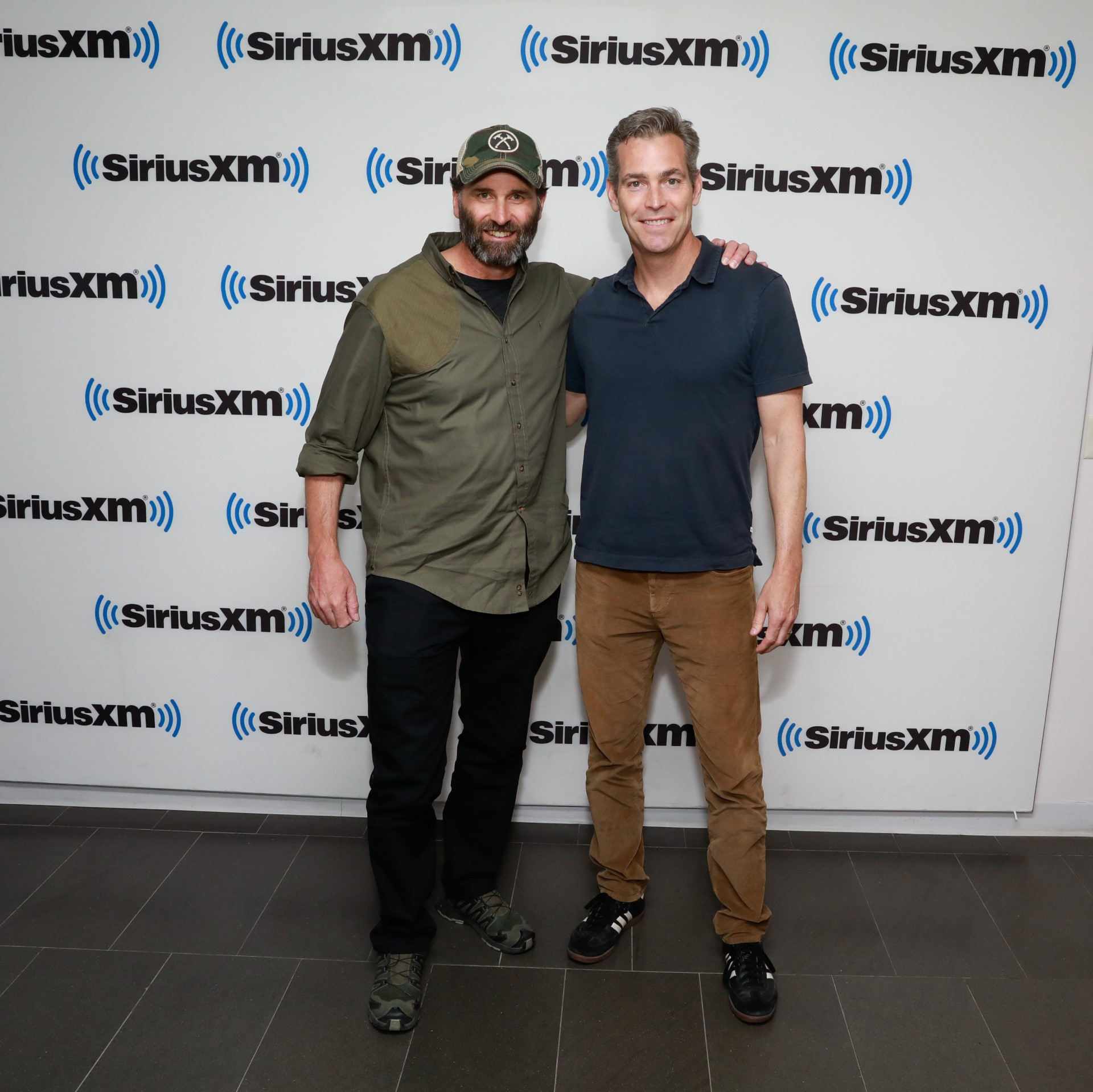
Doug Brunt (right) with author Jack Carr at the SiriusXM studios in New York City, June 2023

In October 2022, Brunt launched the show Dedicated with Doug Brunt in partnership with SiriusXM. Brunt has long-form conversations with authors, and begins each show by mixing the favorite cocktail of his guest. Guests of the show include Jennifer Egan, Amor Towles, Lee Child, James Patterson, Min Jin Lee, David Duchovny, Rick Springfield, Anna Quindlen, Marlon James, Dennis Lehane, Nelson DeMille, Steve Forbes, Diana Gabaldon, Jess Walter, Emily St. John Mandel, and Brad Thor.

== Personal life ==
On March 1, 2008, Brunt married television journalist Megyn Kelly, in Huntington, New York. Kelly is a podcaster, and a former anchor for Fox News and NBC News. The couple has three children: two sons and a daughter. All three children were conceived through in vitro fertilization. He resides in Connecticut with Kelly and their children.
