= Cotton Patch Café =

American restaurant chain

Logo

Cotton Patch Cafe is a Dallas, Texas-based American restaurant chain. Originally opened in Nacogdoches, Texas in 1989, the chain now has casual dining restaurants located in the states of Texas, New Mexico and Oklahoma.

== Locations ==
In May 2020, the Cotton Patch Cafe in Claremore, as well as numerous other sites in the business, including Ada, Ardmore, Broken Arrow, Claremore, Siloam Springs, and Springdale, announced they would be permanently closed due to the long-term effects of COVID-19.
