= Sunday Night with Megyn Kelly =

2017 American television news magazine

- Genre: News magazine
- Presented by: Megyn Kelly
- Country of origin: United States
- No. of seasons: 1
- No. of episodes: 8

Production
- Executive producers: David Corvo; Liz Cole
- Running time: 60 minutes
- Production company: NBC News

Original release
- Network: NBC
- Release: June 4 – July 30, 2017

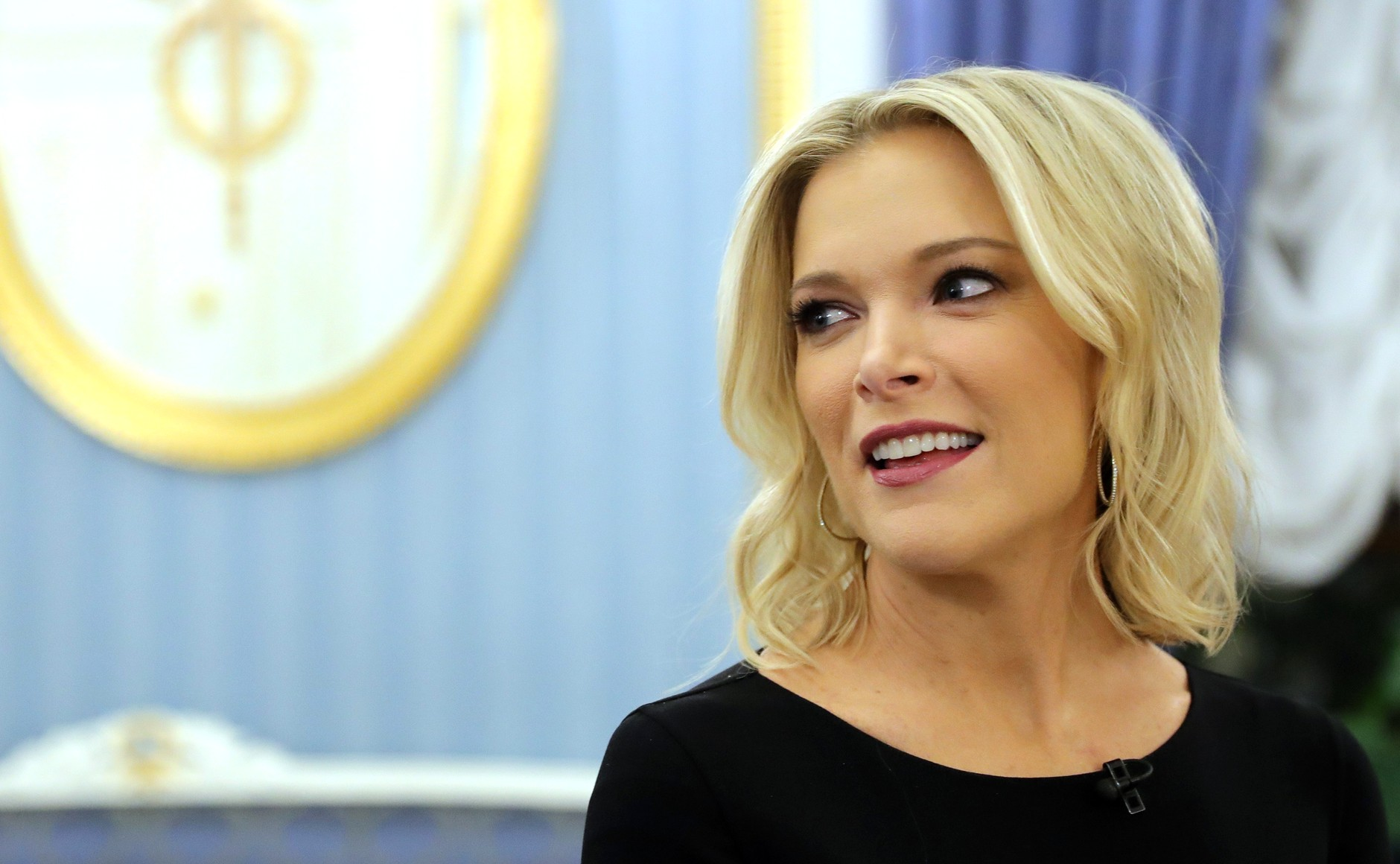
Megyn Kelly in 2018

Sunday Night with Megyn Kelly is an American television news magazine hosted by journalist and former attorney Megyn Kelly.

The series premiered on NBC on June 4, 2017, as Kelly's first NBC News program since her departure from Fox News. It initially ran over the summer. The series was announced in 2018 as returning sporadically until the beginning of NFL season, as opposed to being weekly but never returned.

Kelly terminated her contract with NBC in January 2019.

== Host and correspondents ==
Host

- Megyn Kelly (2017)

Correspondents

- Cynthia McFadden (2017)
- Keith Morrison (2017)
- Harry Smith (2017)
- Kate Snow (2017)
- Jacob Soboroff (2017)
- Katy Tur (2017)
- Craig Melvin (2017)

== Reception ==
=== Critical reaction ===
The series received a 30% approval rating from Rotten Tomatoes based on 10 reviews with an average of 0/10. Its consensus states "Sunday Night with Megyn Kelly finds its talented anchor attempting to move outside her comfort zone – and flailing through the largely unimpressive results."

Early reviews were mostly negative. Reviewing Kelly's interview with Russian president Vladimir Putin, Lorraine Ali of Los Angeles Times wrote that Kelly "tried to deliver something substantive in under 10 minutes, and it wound up making her coming-out party more of a fizzle than a bang." Variety television critic Maureen Ryan concluded that "Kelly herself was, as she has always been, poised on camera. But the show will have to go much further in matters of quality, urgency and coherence to justify the investment in the anchor. In interviews, Kelly sounds as if she's been eager to prove herself outside the narrow confines of her former perch. That process still appears to be a work in progress, at best."

Kelly's interview of Alex Jones drew favorable praise. The Hollywood Reporter concluded that "the segment covered all the right bases, albeit frustratingly briefly. But it needed to be far more hard-hitting."

=== Viewership ===
Sunday Night with Megyn Kelly debuted with 6.1 million viewers (with a 0.2 rating in the 25–54 demographic).

The June 18 episode, which featured an interview with Jones, drew 3.5 million viewers (with a 0.5 rating in the 18–49 demographic), ranking fourth during its timeslot. The airing was topped behind reruns of 60 Minutes (which also received the same demographic rating) and America's Funniest Home Videos, and the U.S Golf Open Championship.

By mid-July 2017, the show's viewership had declined every week from each episode. The July 16 episode averaged 3.1 million viewers (with a 0.4 rating in the 18–49 demographic) marking the show's lowest viewer turnout since its debut.

=== Alex Jones controversy ===
At the end of the June 11 episode, Kelly previewed an interview with conspiracy theorist and radio talk show host Alex Jones. The interview drew an immediate backlash from the families of victims of the Sandy Hook Elementary School shooting massacre on social media; most of whom protested to giving a platform to Jones, who has previously asserted that the massacre that claimed twenty-six lives was faked by the government. Also, the interview was criticized as being in poor taste as it coincided with Father's Day. On June 12, JPMorgan Chase announced that it would pull its advertising from the show and all NBC programming until after the interview aired. Kristin Lemkau, chief marketing officer of JPMorgan Chase, tweeted "As an advertiser, I'm repulsed that @megynkelly would give a second of airtime to someone who says Sandy Hook and Aurora are hoaxes."

On June 13, 2017, Kelly was dropped from hosting the Promise Champions Gala, an annual event for the Sandy Hook Promise Foundation. In a statement, Nicole Hockley issued "Sandy Hook Promise cannot support the decision by Megyn or NBC to give any form of voice or platform to Alex Jones and have asked Megyn Kelly to step down as our Promise Champion Gala host." In reaction, Kelly defended the interview issuing a tweet that "Our goal in sitting down with him was to shine a light – as journalist are supposed to do – on this influential figure, and yes, to discuss the considerable falsehoods he has promoted to near impunity." Kelly also asserted that Jones has received praise from President Donald Trump, who has appeared on his show and granted Infowars White House press credentials.

Additionally, Jones wanted NBC to retract the interview claiming it was deceptively edited. In an interview with The Hollywood Reporter, Jones stated "Don't air the piece, because from the promos NBC has run, Megyn is distorting me. It has all the markings of a PR stunt. The minute she put that promo out there, there were groups calling for boycotts. It was basically instantaneous." Despite the criticism, NBC announced that they intended to move forward with the interview.

NBC's owned and operated station in Hartford, Connecticut, WVIT (channel 30), refused to carry that night's program after feedback from viewers and Sandy Hook families against doing so, and referred viewers to alternate next-day streaming venues if they wanted to watch the interview.
