= Blake Falls Reservoir =

- Location within New York Blake Falls Reservoir (the United States)
- Location: Adirondack Park, St. Lawrence County, New York, US
- Coordinates: 44°28′53″N 74°45′22″W
- Type: Reservoir
- Primary inflows: Raquette River
- Primary outflows: Raquette River
- Basin countries: United States
- Surface area: 631 acres (255 ha)
- Average depth: 7.2 ft (2.2 m)
- Max. depth: 45 ft (14 m)
- Surface elevation: 1,250 ft (380 m)
- Islands: 6

The Blake Falls Reservoir is a reservoir in the Adirondack Park in Parishville, New York. It is a popular recreational fishing spot, stocked with brown bullhead, northern pike, smallmouth bass, walleye, and yellow perch.
