= The Kelly File =

- Genre: Current affairs
- Presented by: Megyn Kelly
- Theme music composer: David Brent
- Country of origin: United States
- Original language: English

Production
- Production locations: Rockefeller Center, New York City
- Camera setup: Multi-camera
- Running time: 60 minutes

Original release
- Network: Fox News
- Release: October 7, 2013 – January 6, 2017

The Kelly File is an American news television program hosted by journalist and former attorney Megyn Kelly on the Fox News. The program is a spinoff of The O'Reilly Factor, and focuses on late-breaking stories in a live format as well as news analysis and in-depth investigative reports interspersed with newsmaker interviews.

Premiering on October 7, 2013, the program aired Monday through Friday live from 9:00 pm to 10:00 pm ET. It was rebroadcast from 12:00 am to 1:00 am ET, however in the event of a breaking news story, the 12:00 am rebroadcast was replaced with an additional live show. A pre-recorded Sunday edition also aired, featuring the top story of the week.

On January 3, 2017, it was announced Kelly would be leaving the network to move over to NBC News. The last episode of The Kelly File was broadcast on January 6, Kelly's last day with Fox News. The show was replaced on Fox News' 9 pm time slot by Tucker Carlson Tonight, which relocated from the 7 pm time slot.

Trish Regan was a frequent guest host of the program in Kelly's absence.
