= Link Lauren =

American right-wing content creator

Link Lauren (born September 8th, 1999) is an American TikTok content creator, musician, British royal family commentator, and a senior aide for Robert F. Kennedy Jr. during his 2024 presidential election campaign.

== Biography ==
Lauren was raised in Dallas, Texas and graduated from New York University in 2022 with a degree in music business and entertainment.

He started his career on TikTok creating songs before shifting to commentary on the British royal family. Following this, he became a political news online influencer affiliated with Marianne Williamson, Dean Phillips, Vivek Ramaswamy, and Robert F. Kennedy Jr. Kennedy employed Lauren in November 2023 in order to use Lauren's TikTok presence to reach younger voters. According to the Washington Post, Lauren played a key role in organizing some of Kennedy's online campaigns. By May 2024, it was reported that he had left Kennedy's campaign.
