= Gretchen Carlson =

American broadcast journalist (born 1966)

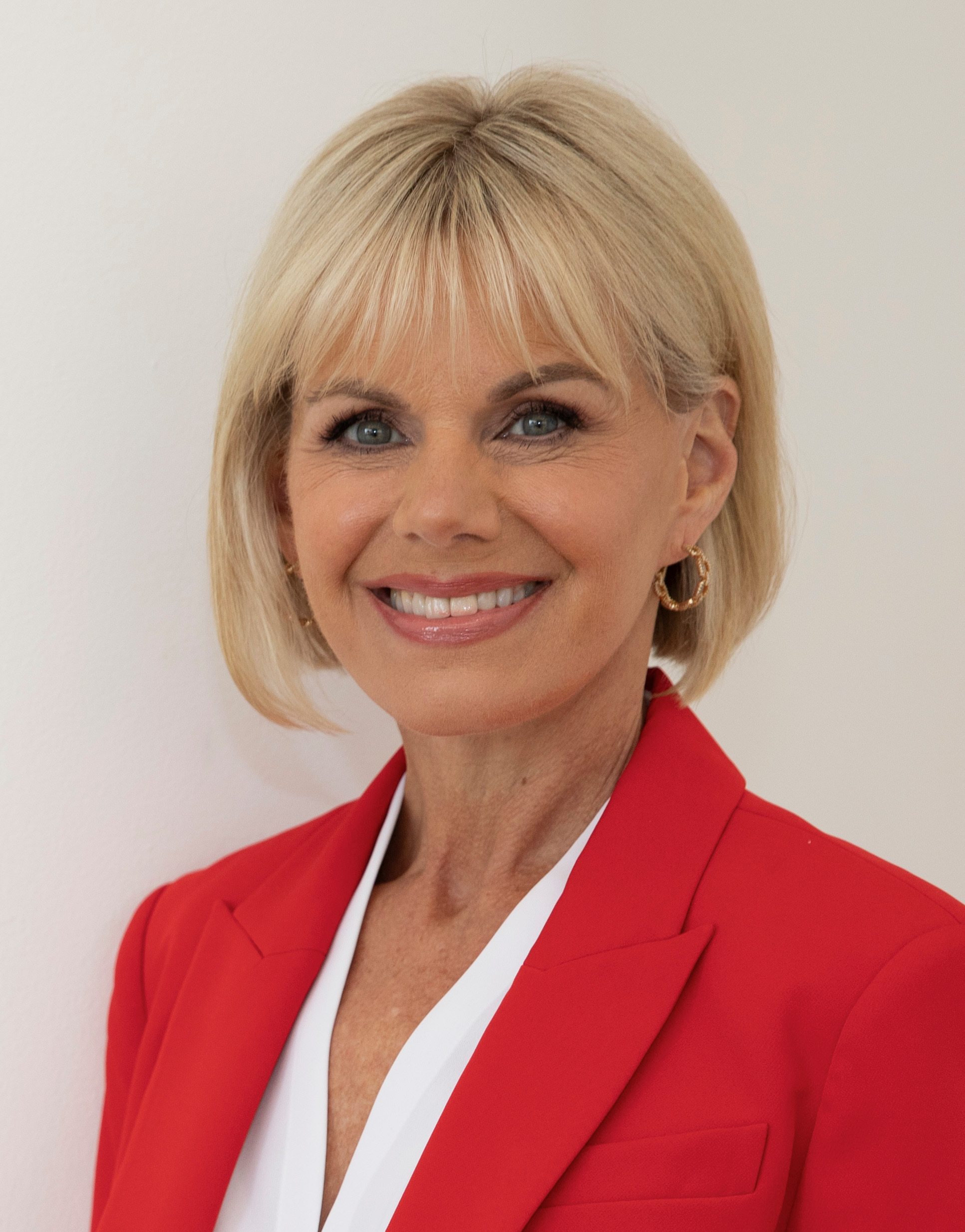
- Carlson in 2025
- Born: Gretchen Elizabeth Carlson; June 21, 1966 (age 60); Coon Rapids, Minnesota, U.S.
- Education: Stanford University (BA)
- Occupations: Television journalist; author; speaker; philanthropist
- Years active: 1989–present
- Organization: Lift Our Voices
- Known for: Advocacy against retaliation for or suppression of sexual assault and harassment claims; Champion of the Ending Forced Arbitration of Sexual Assault and Sexual Harassment Act (2022)
- Notable credit(s): The Saturday Early Show co-host (2002–2005); Fox and Friends co-host (2005–2013); The Real Story with Gretchen Carlson host (2013–2016)
- Television: CBS News (2000–2005); Fox News (2005–2016)
- Title: Miss Minnesota 1988; Miss America 1989
- Movement: Me Too movement
- Spouse: Casey Close (m. 1997)
- Children: 2
- Website: gretchencarlson.com

Gretchen Elizabeth Carlson (born June 21, 1966) is an American broadcast journalist, writer, and television personality.

Carlson was born and raised in Minnesota. A talented youth violinist, Carlson competed in a number of music contests before becoming a beauty pageant contestant. After winning Miss Minnesota in 1988, Carlson became Miss America for 1989. She attended Stanford University and graduated in 1990.

Carlson became a television anchor, working for several local TV stations in Virginia, Ohio, and Texas before becoming a national correspondent and anchor on CBS. She hosted the Saturday edition of The Early Show on CBS News from 2002 to 2005. Carlson subsequently moved to Fox News's morning show Fox & Friends, from 2005 to 2013, and The Real Story with Gretchen Carlson on Fox News from 2013 to 2016.

In July 2016, Carlson filed a lawsuit against then Fox News chairman and CEO Roger Ailes, claiming sexual harassment. Subsequently, dozens of other women also stepped forward to accuse Ailes of harassment, and Ailes resigned under pressure. In September 2016 Carlson and 21st Century Fox settled the lawsuit reportedly for $20 million, and Carlson received a public apology. Carlson's was one of the first high-publicity cases of 2016's #MeToo movement.

In 2019 she co-founded Lift Our Voices to work towards a ban on non-disclosure agreements (NDAs) and forced arbitration clauses in employment agreements. In February 2022, the U.S. Congress passed the Ending Forced Arbitration of Sexual Assault and Sexual Harassment Act, a law championed by Carlson which excludes sexual assault and sexual harassment complaints from arbitration clauses, including retroactively. On March 3, 2022, President Joe Biden signed the bill into law. On December 7, 2022, he also signed the Speak Out Act, another bill backed by Carlson.

Carlson also served as chairwoman of the board of directors of the Miss America Organization from 2018 to 2019. In 2017 Carlson was named one of Time magazine's 100 Most Influential People In The World. She has written two books, her memoir Getting Real, and the New York Times bestseller Be Fierce: Stop Harassment and Take Your Power Back.

== Early life and education ==
Carlson was born in Coon Rapids, Minnesota, the daughter of Karen Barbara (née Hyllengren) and Lee Roy Carlson, one of four children. Her father studied business at Gustavus Adolphus College and later became owner/operator of Main Motor Sales, an automobile dealership started by her grandfather in 1919. Carlson, whose grandfather was a minister, is of Swedish descent through both parents. One of her childhood babysitters, Michele Bachmann, was the future Republican congresswoman who ran for president.

In her youth, Carlson was a violinist who performed on radio and television. She studied with Dorothy DeLay at the Juilliard School of Music in New York City, and with Mary West of the MacPhail Center For Music in Minneapolis. Carlson performed in several competitions, such as the Stulberg International String Competition, where she was a finalist in 1982, the American String Teachers Association, where she won second place in 1981 to Joshua Bell. She attended Aspen Music Festival from 1976 to 1983, and was a member of the Greater Twin Cities Youth Symphony from 1980 to 1984. Carlson graduated from Anoka-Hennepin School District 11's Anoka High School, where she was the 1984 valedictorian.

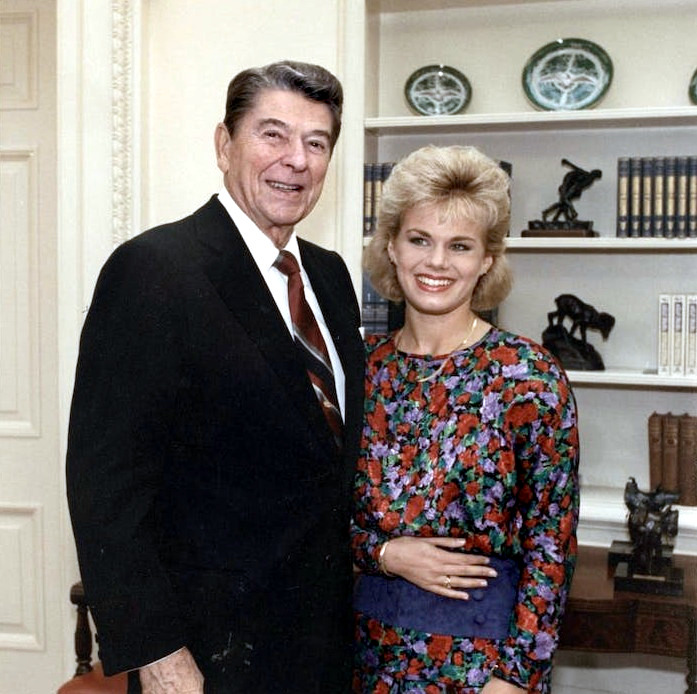
Carlson with President Ronald Reagan in 1988

Carlson was crowned Miss Minnesota in June 1988 and became Miss America 1989 on September 10, 1988. She was the first classical violinist to win those titles. Following Carlson's Miss America win, she was invited to meet President Ronald Reagan in the Oval Office. She made many television appearances during her year of service, including appearing on The David Letterman Show. After Carlson's appearance as a newscaster in a sketch on Bloopers and Practical Jokes with Ed McMahon and Dick Clark, several television agents called, eventually launching her career in broadcast television.

Carlson graduated from Stanford University in 1990 with honors, where she studied organizational behavior. She spent a study-abroad period at Oxford University, studying the works of Virginia Woolf. She was a member of the Kappa Kappa Gamma sorority. According to Carlson, she planned to attend law school and had completed the LSAT exam, but instead started to work in television.

== Career ==
=== Early career and CBS News ===
A year after becoming Miss America in 1989, Carlson secured a role on WRIC-TV, an ABC-affiliated television station serving Richmond, Virginia as a co-anchor on the network and political commentator. Style Weekly deemed it a coup for WRIC-TV at the time. In 1992, she joined WCPO-TV, serving Cincinnati, Ohio as a media commentator and remained at the station for a period of two years. She later worked at WOIO/WUAB in Cleveland, Ohio, where Carlson, along with colleague Denise Dufala, became the first women to co-anchor a primetime major-market newscast.

Following her time in Cleveland, Carlson served as a weekend anchor and reporter for KXAS-TV in Dallas/Fort Worth, Texas, from 1998 to 2000.

Carlson moved to the national television scene as a national correspondent in 2000, and in 2002 became the co-anchor of the Saturday edition of The Early Show on CBS, along with Russ Mitchell. During her time at the network, she frequently anchored the weekend edition of the CBS Evening News.

=== Fox News ===
Carlson first appeared on Fox & Friends as a weekend substitute host in 2006. On September 25, 2006, after a shifting of anchors, which included E.D. Hill moving to the 10 a.m. hour of Fox News Live, Carlson became the anchor of Fox & Friends. She co-hosted with Steve Doocy and Brian Kilmeade for almost 8 years. In 2013, Carlson admitted on Brian Kilmeade's radio show that Fox News female anchors were not allowed to wear pants.

Carlson left Fox & Friends in September 2013 to anchor a one-hour daytime program, The Real Story with Gretchen Carlson, beginning in the fall of 2013, taking part of the slot opened by Megyn Kelly's move to primetime. She covered stories that supported women's rights, including an opinion piece on Robin Wright of the Netflix series House of Cards, noting her demand for the same salary as Kevin Spacey.

=== 2016–present ===
==== Miss America Organization ====
On January 1, 2018, Carlson was elected chairwoman of the board of directors of the Miss America Organization, a volunteer role. Shortly after joining as chairwoman, Carlson's first major decision was to remove the swimsuit competition from the pageant, following a unanimous vote from the board of directors. The swimsuit competitions would be replaced with on-stage interviews. The new format was referred to as "Miss America 2.0", and the move aimed to follow the #MeToo movement.

Following internal backlash, Carlson resigned from Chairwoman of the Board in June 2019. Around the same time, it was announced that the Miss America brand would return to NBC.

==== Other television and media ====
In April 2018, Carlson reached a first-look development deal with A&E Networks, under which she would host three documentary specials across its channels, such as Lifetime. Gretchen Carlson: Breaking the Silence focuses on the every woman story of workplace sexual harassment and premiered on Lifetime on January 14, 2019.

In May 2018, Carlson was a correspondent on an episode of the television documentary series America Divided, which airs on Epix. Carlson produced her episode with Norman Lear, titled "Washington's War on Women", about sexual harassment on Capitol Hill.

Carlson also hosted Live PD Presents: Women on Patrol and Escaping Polygamy on Lifetime in 2018. In August 2019, it was announced that Carlson would host two hourlong documentaries from the "Beyond the Headlines" franchise. The first called Escaping the NXIVM Cult: A Mother's Fight to Save Her Daughter, and the second The College Admissions Scandal.

In December 2019, Carlson wrote an opinion article in The New York Times, stating that she still cannot disclose what happened to her at Fox News due to a nondisclosure agreement, but that it was her desire to be able to do so. In January 2020, Carlson announced a new television deal with Blumhouse Productions to produce a new interview style series. In October 2020, it was announced that Carlson would join PEOPLE (the TV Show!) as a special contributor.

In April 2021, Carlson and her life story was featured on the PBS television program Finding Your Roots in order to explore her family genealogy. It was shown through investigative and DNA research that she is a full-blooded Scandinavian-American, and that much of her family originated in Småland, Sweden.

== Activism and philanthropy ==
=== MeToo movement ===
With one bold legal filing, Carlson exposed Ailes's predatory tactics, dragged Fox News into the twenty-first century, affected Trump's presidential race, and lit the match that led to the modern-day #MeToo movement. The Ailes scandal led The New York Times to look more deeply into Bill O'Reilly, which led other Times reporters to ask around about Harvey Weinstein, and now Weinstein is behind bars and the world is at least a little bit more equitable.

— Hoax: Donald Trump, Fox News, and the Dangerous Distortion of Truth by Brian Stelter

On July 6, 2016, Carlson filed a sexual harassment lawsuit against Fox News chairman Roger Ailes in the Superior Court of New Jersey and confirmed on her Twitter account that she was no longer with Fox News. In her complaint, Carlson alleged that she was fired from her program for refusing Ailes's sexual advances. Ailes at the time claimed the accusations were false, while the law firm representing Carlson claimed ten other women had contacted them to speak of Ailes' behavior at Fox News and throughout his television career.

Carlson's allegations received widespread media coverage. After Carlson came forward, six more women spoke to Gabriel Sherman of New York magazine, alleging that Ailes had sexually harassed them and that Ailes "spoke openly of expecting women to perform sexual favors in exchange for job opportunities". Shortly thereafter, Carlson sat down for an interview with John Koblin of The New York Times, saying, "I wanted to stand up for other women who may be facing similar circumstances."

As the case progressed, Carlson reached out directly to her fans, thanking them in a series of Twitter videos and offering her support for fellow victims of sexual harassment. She also criticized Fox's attempt to force her claims to be adjudicated via closed-door mandatory arbitration rather than in court. Fox filed court papers arguing that Carlson was compelled by her contract to adjudicate her claims in arbitration. Carlson said: "Forcing victims of sexual harassment into secret arbitration proceedings is wrong, because it means nobody finds out what really happened."

After Ailes resigned on July 21, 2016, Carlson said she felt "relief that now I would be believed", though she also "felt angry that it took so long" for Ailes to step down. Eight days later, her Fox program The Real Story aired its final episode.

On September 6, 2016, 21st Century Fox announced that it had settled the lawsuit with Carlson for $20 million. As part of the settlement, 21st Century Fox apologized to Carlson, saying, "We sincerely regret and apologize for the fact that Gretchen was not treated with the respect and dignity that she and all of our colleagues deserve."

=== Philanthropy and public work ===
President Biden Signs into Law H.R. 4445, the "Ending Forced Arbitration of Sexual Assault and Sexual Harassment Act of 2021" with Vice President Kamala Harris and Gretchen Carlson.

Since her harassment complaint became public, Carlson has focused her public work to modify laws that protect sexual predators. In December 2017, she joined a bipartisan coalition of legislators to introduce the Ending Forced Arbitration of Sexual Assault and Sexual Harassment Act, which voids forced arbitration agreements that prevent sexual harassment survivors from getting their day in court. Carlson testified before the House Judiciary Committee in May, 2019. In February 2022, the U.S. Congress passed the Ending Forced Arbitration of Sexual Assault and Sexual Harassment Act, which excludes sexual assault and sexual harassment complaints from arbitration clauses, including retroactively, a law championed by Carlson. On March 3, 2022, President Joe Biden signed the bill into law during a ceremony where Carlson was introduced by Vice President Kamala Harris. After signing the bill into law, President Biden handed the pen used to Carlson.

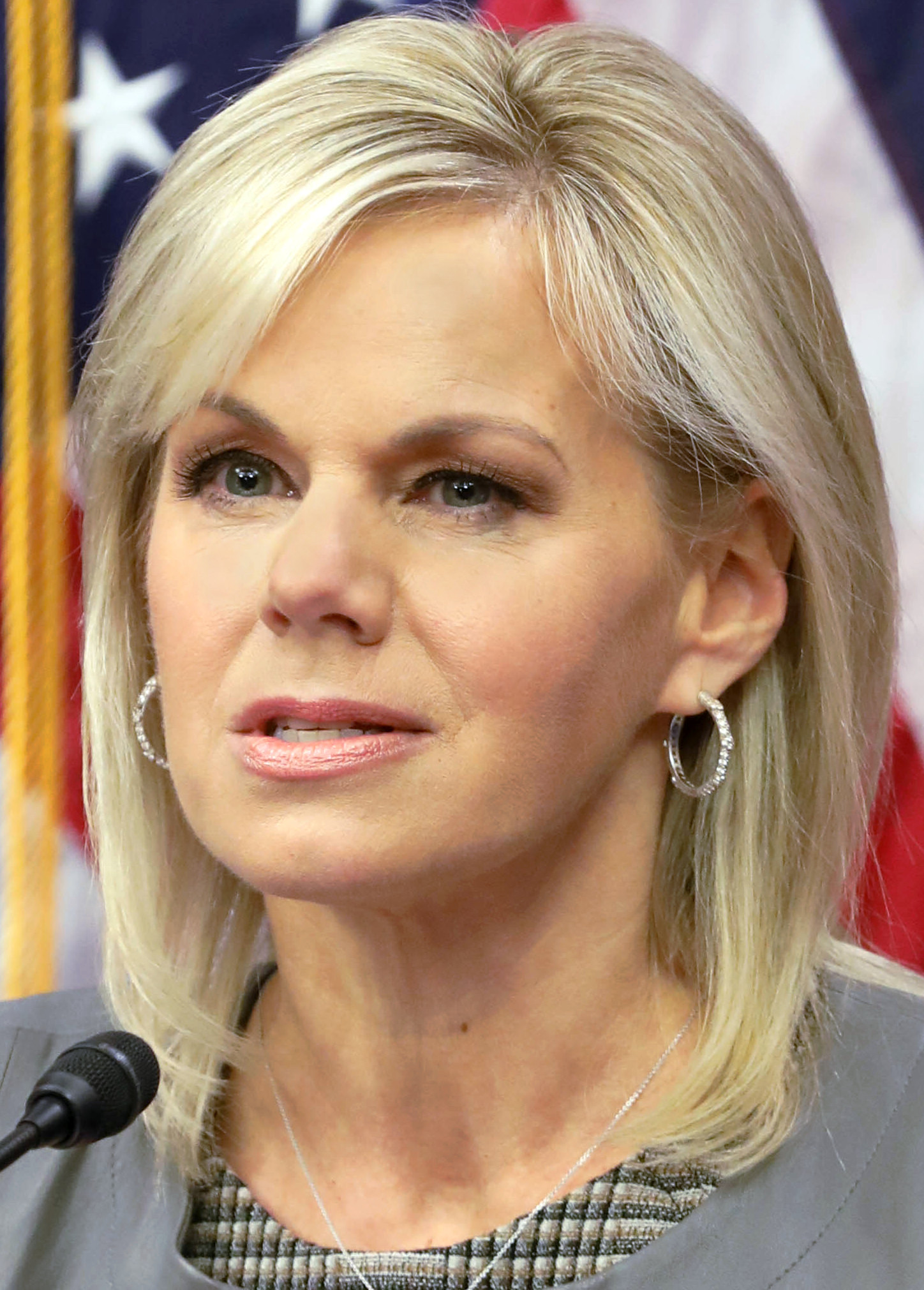
Carlson in 2017

Carlson created the Gift of Courage Fund in 2017 and partnered with the nonprofit organization All In Together to create the Gretchen Carlson Leadership Initiative, (GCLI) a program meant to "bring civic leadership and advocacy training to thousands of underserved women across the country, with a special focus on empowering women who have experienced gender-based violence, discrimination, or harassment." The initiative has hosted 13 community engagement workshops since its founding. In 2018, Carlson's Gift of Courage Fund also supplied the grant to create the Gretchen Carlson March of Dimes Advocacy Fellows, a program that selected 20 women from across the country to become more civically involved in promoting legislation and policies benefitting women and children. More recently, Carlson co-founded the non-profit organization Lift Our Voices with the mission of eradicating arbitration clauses in employment contracts and non-disclosure agreements (NDAs) that serve to silence women and men in the workplace.

In 2017, Carlson was named one of Time magazine 100 Most Influential People in the World, was the recipient of the Matrix Award, and was named to Variety's Most Powerful Women of Impact list. In 2018, she received the 2018 YWCA Phenomenal Woman Award and the New York National Organization for Women (NOW) Women of Power and Influence Award. In 2020, Carlson received the Sandra Day O'Connor Lifetime Achievement Award from the Arizona Foundation for Women. In July 2020, Carlson headlined a panel with Bethenny Frankel on how global emergencies affect philanthropic priorities for Town & Country's 2020 Philanthropy Summit.

=== Lift Our Voices ===
At The Hollywood Reporter's 2019 Women in Entertainment ceremony, Carlson spoke about her lawsuit against Fox News over sexual harassment and announced her new anti-nondisclosure agreements initiative, Lift Our Voices, (LOV) which she founded with former Fox News colleagues Julie Roginsky and Diana Falzone. The organization advocates for laws banning the use of arbitration clauses in employment contracts and confidentiality agreements in sexual harassment settlements. The initiative focuses on NDA's solely dealing with toxic workplace environment issues like sexual harassment, not those protecting trade secrets.

In November 2020, lawsuits discovered by Business Insider found that multiple women had stated in legal filings that Michael Bloomberg, the former New York City mayor and presidential candidate, fostered a toxic, fraternity-like culture at his company during the 1990s. Carlson's organization LOV asked every presidential candidate to sign on to supporting Lift Our Voices in January 2020. Every candidate did except for President Donald J. Trump, Senator Bernie Sanders, Senator Amy Klobuchar and Bloomberg. Soon thereafter, Carlson's organization wrote an op-ed in The Des Moines Register encouraging the debate moderators in Iowa to ask the Democratic presidential candidates about their stance on NDAs. The question did appear on the debate and after appearing in his first and only presidential debate, Bloomberg ended his campaign partly due to the heavy scrutiny surrounding the topic of NDAs.

In 2021, Carlson and Roginsky, along with Cher Scarlett, a labor activist in tech, wrote an essay for The Olympian encouraging Washington State Legislature to pass a bill Scarlett had worked with on with House Representative Liz Berry and Senator Karen Keiser to expand protections for workers facing unlawful conduct in the workplace, disallowing employers from enforcing NDAs in cases of discrimination, assault, and harassment.

== In popular culture ==
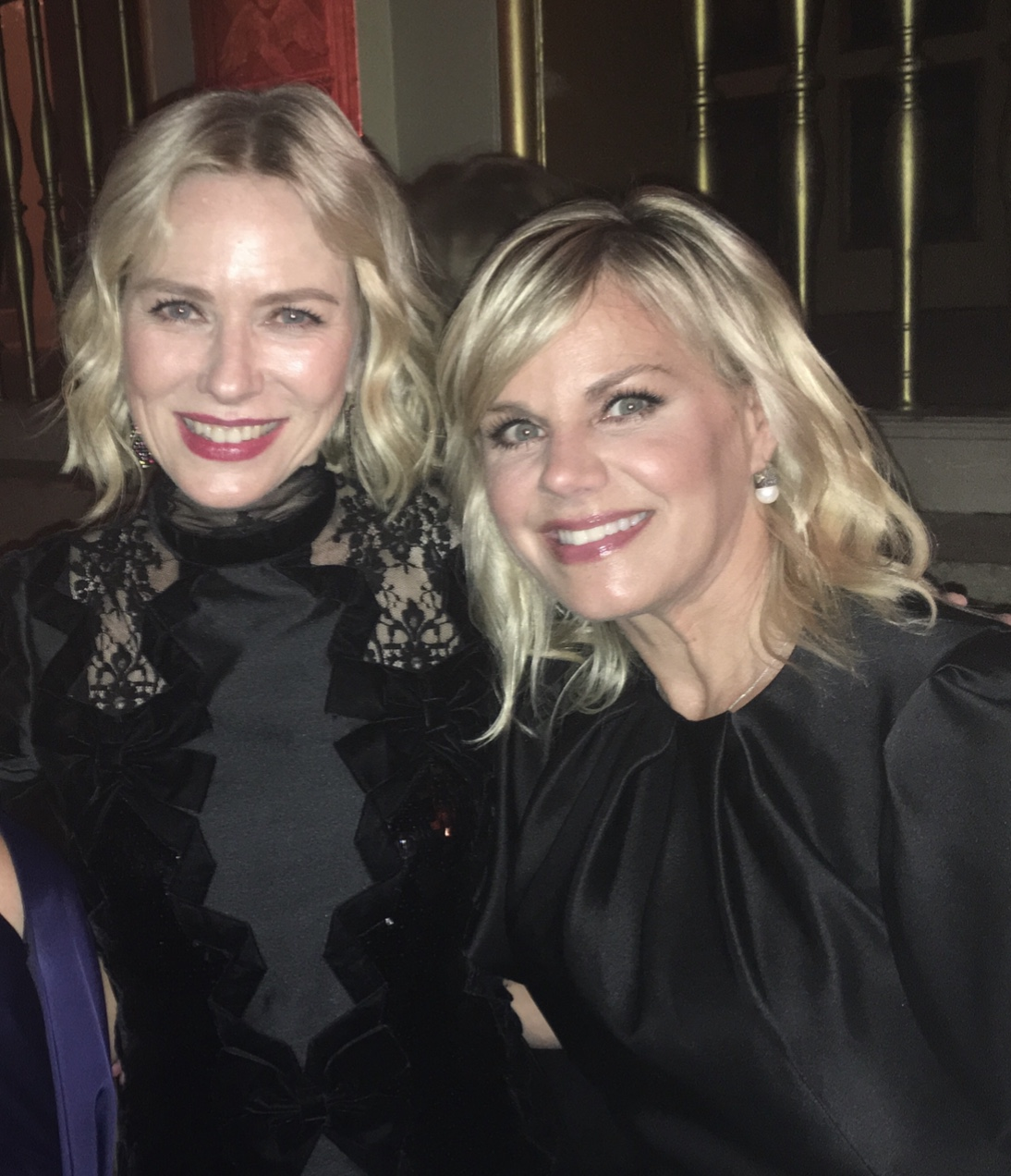
Carlson with Naomi Watts in 2019.

=== The Loudest Voice miniseries ===
In 2019, Carlson's career at Fox News was portrayed on the Showtime miniseries, The Loudest Voice. Her role as co-anchor at Fox News was depicted by actress Naomi Watts. Many incidents in Carlson and Ailes' relationship were portrayed to the public for the first time, since Carlson was unable to speak directly about the events due to a confidentiality clause in the settlement between her and Fox News.

The series aired the audio recordings taken by Carlson during her time at Fox News for the first time. The recordings were of various incidents at Fox where Carlson was sexually harassed by Ailes and other colleagues at Fox News. The show also follows the incidents leading up to Carlson reporting the sexual harassment she received. The Loudest Voice then portrayed her demotion and the events that followed her filing the internal complaint, many of which were recorded. The recordings went on to play a major part in the settlement negotiations between Carlson and Fox News.

=== Bombshell film ===
Bombshell, a film portraying Roger Ailes' sexual harassment of the talent while Carlson was at Fox News, was released on December 13, 2019. Carlson is played by Nicole Kidman, with other cast members including Margot Robbie as Kayla Pospisil (a composite character), Charlize Theron as Megyn Kelly, and John Lithgow as Roger Ailes. The film follows events at Fox News in the run-up to Ailes resigning from the organization after being exposed for sexual harassment.

== Personal life ==
On October 4, 1997, Carlson married sports agent and former professional baseball player Casey Close. They live in Greenwich, Connecticut, with their two children.

She announced on Fox & Friends on June 9, 2009, and repeated on Glenn Beck's Fox News program, that her parents' car dealership had been selected for closure as part of the General Motors reorganization and bankruptcy. A year later, the Minneapolis Star Tribune reported that "It took an act of Congress, a national TV appeal and maybe a little bit of history on the owners' side, but Main Motor, the Anoka car dealership that Lee and Karen Carlson's family has owned for 91 years, will keep its General Motors dealership after all."

Carlson remains an advocate of the arts from her experience as a child violinist. As a string instrumentalist in her youth, Carlson had admired cellist Yo-Yo Ma, whom she eventually met when they both spoke at the 2019 Dreamforce Conference in San Francisco.

== Bibliography ==
In 2015, Carlson released her first book, Getting Real, a memoir about her life growing up in Minnesota, her violin career, Miss America experience and television career.

In 2017, Carlson released her second book, Be Fierce: Stop Harassment And Take Your Power Back. The book discussed as much of Carlson's story at Fox News as she was allowed to comment on because of the NDA she signed, but also many other stories of sexual harassment in the workplace from women who reached out to Carlson after her story became public. The profits from the book, a New York Times bestseller, go to the Gift of Courage Fund.

- Carlson, Gretchen: Getting Real. New York City: Viking, 2015. ISBN 978-0-5254-2745-2.
- Carlson, Gretchen: Be Fierce: Stop Harassment and Take Your Power Back. Center Street, 2017. ISBN 978-1478992172.

Awards and achievements
Preceded by Kaye Lani Rae Rafko	Miss America; 1989	Succeeded by Debbye Turner
Preceded by Katherine Killeen	Miss Minnesota; 1988	Succeeded by Susan Johnson
