= Julie Roginsky =

American democratic strategist and TV personality

- Born: Moscow, Soviet Union
- Occupations: TV host; political commentator
- Political party: Democratic
- Children: 1
- Website: liftourvoices.org

Julie Roginsky is an American Democratic Party strategist, television personality and the founder of the non-profit Lift Our Voices, who has been credited with passing landmark federal civil rights legislation in the wake of the MeToo movement. She was a contributor with the Fox News Channel where she was a frequent co-host on Outnumbered, and The Five. Prior to working at Fox News, she was a contributor for CNBC. She writes the "Salty Politics" online newsletter. Her columns have appeared in USA Today, FoxNews.com, CNBC, Politico, Forbes, Ms. Magazine, and The Star-Ledger.

== Early life ==
Roginsky was born in Moscow, Soviet Union, to Abram and Tanya Roginsky, who were Soviet dissidents of Jewish descent. She was primarily raised by her grandparents until she and her parents were allowed to leave the Soviet Union in 1980. Her grandparents were prohibited from leaving the Soviet Union and became Refuseniks for over a decade until they, too, emigrated to the United States in 1990. Prior to settling in the United States, Roginsky and her family lived briefly in Vienna and Rome.

Roginsky was raised in New York City and Plainsboro Township, New Jersey. She graduated from Princeton Day School and was awarded both her B.A. and M.A. from Boston University. She received her undergraduate degree in political science magna cum laude and was a member of the Golden Key International Honour Society. Her graduate work focused on the dissolution of the Soviet Union and its transition from a planned to a market economy.

== Career in politics ==
In 1993, Roginsky worked for the Labour Party in London, focusing on policies affecting women in the United Kingdom. In 1995, Roginsky was hired by EMILY's List to work on the congressional campaign of Dale McCormick, who was running in a Democratic congressional primary in Maine's 1st congressional district. Following McCormick's primary election loss, Roginsky worked for Rep. Frank Pallone of New Jersey, whose campaign she successfully managed against Mike Ferguson.

In 1999, Roginsky was the first woman to manage the New Jersey Democratic Coordinated Campaign, when the Democratic caucus gained three seats in the General Assembly. She subsequently served as the communications director at the New Jersey Democratic State Committee. In 2001, she became the Washington, D.C.-based Communications Director for Jon Corzine, upon his election to the United States Senate.

In 2003, Roginsky founded Comprehensive Communications Group, a political consulting and public relations firm which has worked on behalf of Fortune 500 corporations, elected officials and non-profit organizations. Senators Cory Booker and Frank Lautenberg and Reps. Albio Sires, Steve Rothman and Frank Pallone have been among the firm's clients.

Roginsky served on the board of directors for the Women's Campaign School at Yale University, a non-partisan leadership program whose goal is to increase the number of women in elected and appointed office. Among the school's graduates are Senator Kirsten Gillibrand and former Rep. Gabby Giffords.

She authors the weekly political column "Friendly Fire" for NJ.com.

== Career in television ==
Roginsky first appeared as a Democratic strategist on Fox News in 2004. In 2009, she was hired by CNBC as an on-air contributor, where she also wrote columns for CNBC. In 2011, she was hired by Fox News as on-air contributor, where she was a frequent co-host of The Five and Outnumbered. Roginsky was the host of "The Clapback" on Fox News, where she would respond to viewers' social media messages live on air and routinely send up fellow Fox anchors like Sean Hannity, to whom she referred as "Sean from Long Island" and Vladimir Putin, whom she called "Volodya from Leningrad." On the show, she strenuously criticized her colleagues for spreading conspiracy theories about the murder of Seth Rich, becoming the only Fox News personality to do so on air. She also contributed columns to the Fox News website.

In April 2017, Roginsky filed a lawsuit in the New York Supreme Court against Fox News, Roger Ailes, and Bill Shine, alleging sexual harassment and retaliation. She settled the suit in December 2017. Roginsky claimed that Ailes offered her a permanent position on The Five if she would have sex with him, and retaliated against her when she refused. She left the network in June 2017.

== Lift Our Voices ==
In 2019, Roginsky founded Lift Our Voices, a non-profit organization to combat silencing mechanisms in the workplace with former Fox News colleagues Gretchen Carlson and Diana Falzone. Roginsky and Carlson debuted the nonprofit at the Hollywood Reporter Women in Entertainment ceremony in Los Angeles. In 2020, the organization called upon all presidential candidates to support the banning of NDAs for toxic workplace issues. Every presidential candidate agreed, with the exception of Donald Trump, Michael Bloomberg, Amy Klobuchar and Bernie Sanders. Since then, the non-profit has been instrumental in passing the Ending Forced Arbitration for Sexual Assault and Sexual Harassment Act and The Speak Out Act. Together, the two laws have been called "the most significant labor legislation this century." In advocating for the Speak Out Act, Roginsky explained that, "If you don't remove these NDAs, you are pushing out the very people that you claim you want to protect and promote. Because it is women, people of color, and the LGBT community that are most likely to face abuses in the workplace. And they're often not only forced to leave their chosen jobs, but their chosen careers." Roginsky has also advocated for the eradication of NDAs for toxic workplace issues at the state level, including in Washington State, New York, Virginia, and Massachusetts.

Roginsky has been credited by members of Congress with being one of the women "whose bravery in speaking out about their abuse helped the #MeToo movement go viral." She regularly gives speeches about the need to eradicate workplace silencing mechanisms, such as forced arbitration and non-disclosure agreements (NDAs) for toxic workplace issues.

== In popular culture ==
Roginsky was portrayed by the actress Ahna O'Reilly in the 2019 movie Bombshell, which depicted Ailes' downfall. Roginsky has said that she could not cooperate with filmmakers because she is bound by an NDA as part of her settlement with Fox News that prevents her from telling her story.

In 2021, it was announced that Roginsky and Carlson will topline a forthcoming feature documentary, In Her Own Words, which will spotlight their movement to stand up to "abusive nondisclosure agreements."

== Personal life ==
Roginsky lives in New York City. In 2012, she gave birth to her first son, Zachary.

In 2022, the Russian government put Roginsky on a blacklist of nearly 1,000 U.S. government officials, television personalities and Hollywood celebrities it branded as "enemies of the Putin regime" and banned her from traveling to Russia. Roginsky said that earning the enmity of the Putin regime has been "the honor of my life."
