= Casey Close =

American baseball player and sports agent

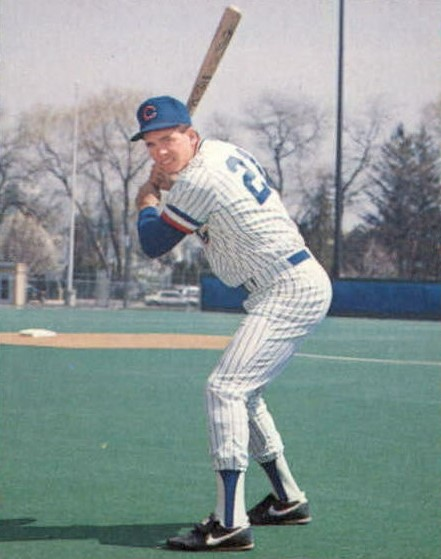
- Born: October 21, 1963 (age 63); Columbus, Ohio, U.S.
- Bats: Right Throws: Right
- Stats at Baseball Reference

Member of the National College

Baseball Hall of Fame
- Induction: 2022

Casey Richard Close (born October 21, 1963) is an American former baseball player and sports agent.

== University of Michigan ==
Close was born in Columbus, Ohio and graduated from Worthington High School before attending the University of Michigan on a baseball scholarship. He played for the Michigan Wolverines baseball team from 1983 to 1986. As a freshman, he hit a grand slam to help Michigan defeat Stanford and advance to the final four in the College World Series.

In 1984 and 1985, Close played collegiate summer baseball for the Harwich Mariners of the Cape Cod Baseball League (CCBL). In 1984, he hit .329 with six home runs while posting a 2–0 record and a 3.19 ERA on the mound. Close was inducted into the CCBL Hall of Fame in 2010.

As a senior in 1986, Close won the batting triple crown in the Big Ten Conference with a .469 batting average, seven home runs and 19 RBIs. In 1986, he was also selected as Michigan's team captain, the Big Ten Conference Player of the Year, the Baseball America National Player of the Year, a first-team All-American, and he was awarded a Big Ten Medal of Honor for demonstrating joint athletic and academic excellence throughout his college career. Close holds the University of Michigan career records for home runs (46) and runs scored (190), and his .869 slugging percentage in 1986 is a single-season record among Michigan baseball players. Close also ranks among Michigan's all-time leaders in several other statistical categories, including games played (second all-time with 229 games played), runs batted in (third all-time with 185 RBIs) and career batting average (fourth all-time at .373). Barry Larkin, who played with Close at Michigan, recalled: "He had power, but didn't have a lot of speed, and that's about all he didn't have. He had a great arm, power and a nice bat."

In January 2011, Close was named as one of the 2011 inductees into the University of Michigan Athletic Hall of Honor.

== Professional baseball ==
Close was drafted by the New York Yankees in the seventh round of the 1986 MLB draft. He played minor league baseball for the Oneonta Yankees (1986), Albany-Colonie Yankees (1987–1988), Columbus Clippers (1988) and Calgary Cannons (1989–1990). He had his best season in professional baseball in 1989 when he appeared in 95 games for Calgary (the Seattle Mariners' AAA club), batting .330 with a .503 slugging percentage, 38 extra base hits and 56 RBIs.

== Sports agent ==
In 1992, Close became associated with IMG as part of its baseball division. In 1993, he began representing Derek Jeter and was Jeter's agent throughout his Major League career. In 2006, Close left IMG and joined Creative Artists Agency (CAA). In January 2007, after winning the 2006 National League MVP award, Ryan Howard hired Close as his agent. Other baseball players who currently are or have been represented by Close include Clayton Kershaw, Zack Greinke, Derrek Lee, Ben Sheets, Michael Cuddyer, Josh Hamilton, Eric Milton, Kenny Lofton and Richie Sexson. Some of the larger deals negotiated by Close for his clients include: a five-year, $125 million contract extension for Ryan Howard in 2010; a 10-year, $189 million deal for Jeter in 2000 (at the time the second richest contract in baseball history); a three-year $51 million deal for Jeter in December 2010; a five-year $65 million deal for Derrek Lee in 2006; a one-year $10 million contract (with $2 million in performance bonuses) for Ben Sheets in 2010; and a six-year $17 million deal for Drew Henson in 2000.

In February 2011, Close announced he was leaving CAA. In April 2011, it was announced he would be starting and heading the baseball division of Excel Sports Management. In 2012, Close negotiated the largest contract for a pitcher at the time for Zack Greinke, worth $147 million over six years for the Los Angeles Dodgers. In December 2013, it was announced Close would represent Japanese pitcher Masahiro Tanaka.

In March 2022, Close negotiated a $162 million contract for first baseman Freddie Freeman with the Los Angeles Dodgers. In July 2022, Close filed a libel lawsuit against Fox Sports radio host Doug Gottlieb, who had claimed that Close did not present an offer from the Atlanta Braves to Freeman.

== Family ==
Close is married to Gretchen Carlson, who was selected as Miss America in 1989 and was the anchor of The Real Story with Gretchen Carlson, on the Fox News Channel. Close and Carlson live in Greenwich, Connecticut with their two children.

Close is a Presbyterian and teaches Sunday school with his wife.
