= Kanakuk Kamps =

Christian children and teen summer camp

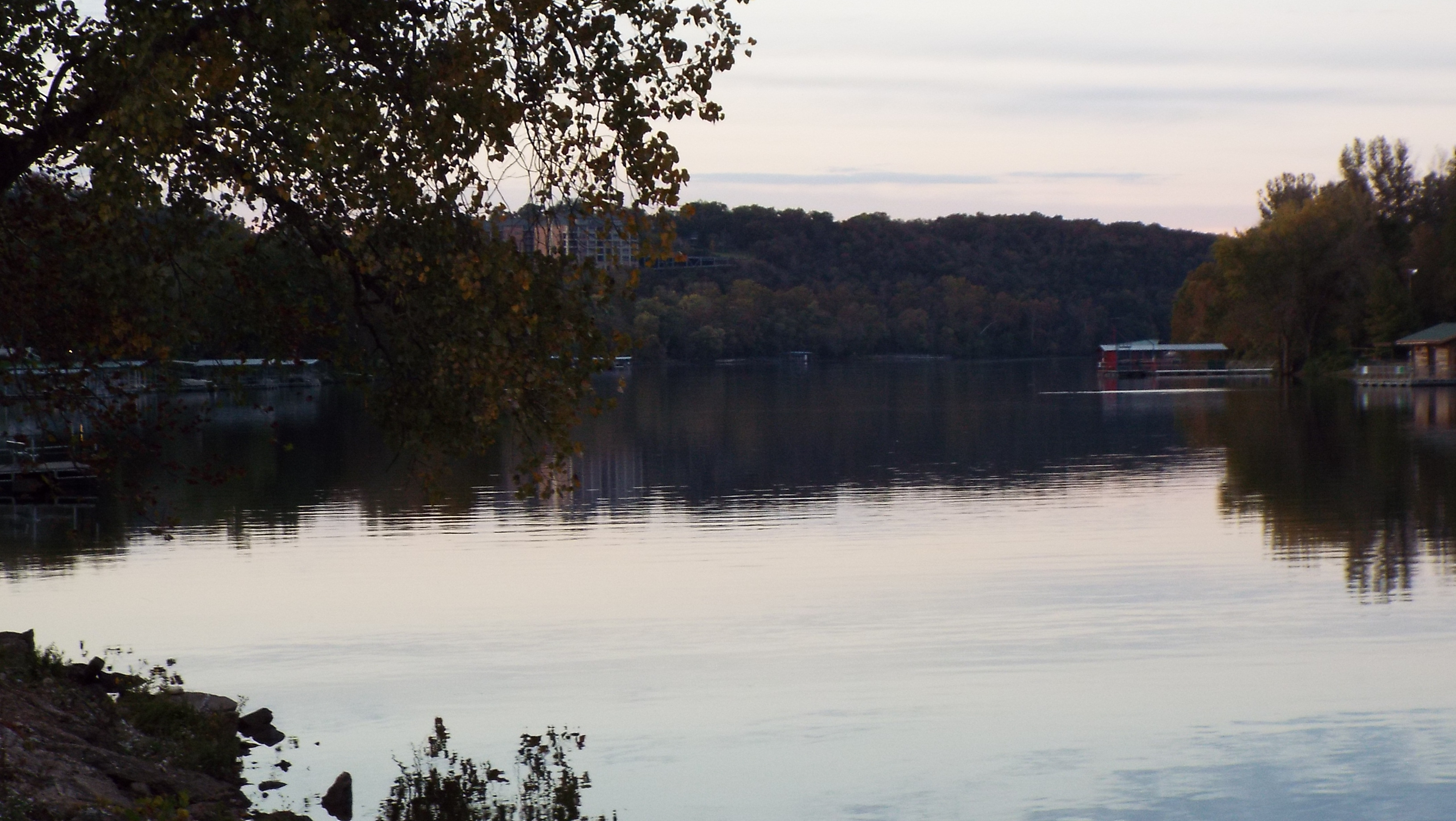
Lake Taneycomo, Missouri

Kanakuk Kamps are a global network of Christian summer camps for children and teens ages 6–18, founded in Branson, Missouri. The camps were founded in 1926 by C.L. Ford and now claim to be one of the largest Christian sports camps. In 2010, camp director Peter Newman was convicted of child sexual abuse, and in the 2020s, many civil suits were filed against the camp for underage sexual abuse.

== History ==
C.L. Ford opened the girls' summer camp Kikapoo Kamp in 1924 on Lake Taneycomo. Girls were part of either the Cherokee or Choctaw tribes, and the camp appropriated Native American rituals for the White children. Ford opened a boys' camp called Kuggaho Kamp in 1927.

In 1932, Coach William C. Lantz became director and changed the name to Kanakuk Kamp. He purchased the property in 1934, then sold it to Spike and Darnell White in 1955. The Whites opened Kanakomo Kamp for girls. Joe White purchased Kanakuk Kamps from his father Spike in 1976, and he is still the director.

The camp has locations in eight states, including Missouri, Illinois, and Texas. Since 1926, Kanakuk has hosted more than 500,000 campers and 50,000 staffers.

In 2020, Kanakuk reported annual revenue of $24 million through its camps and subsidiaries.

== Controversies ==
=== Sexual abuse ===
Media reports, civil lawsuits and criminal prosecutions have documented that Kanakuk Kamps created a culture that allowed predators access to underage children.

Nudity was part of the camp culture, including communal showers and physical inspections of naked campers. At one of the camps called K-Kountry, counselors and campers "all showered together" with "no separate stalls or partitions." As of 2000, Kanakuk's "Employee Playbook" prohibited nudity. Newman, White, and other counselors had conversations about purity, sex, and masturbation.

In response to allegations against Newman, Kanakuk developed a Child Protection Plan in 2009. The plan included not having any more sleepovers with underage boys. Leadership did not report Newman to authorities.

In 2010, camp director Peter Newman pleaded guilty to sexual abuse of six children between 2006 and 2008, although prosecutors alleged the abuse began as early as 1999. He was sentenced to two life sentences plus 30 years in prison. Later, a civil lawsuit filed against Newman stated that he abused 57 underage victims, and he was found liable for more than $5 million.

Another counselor, Lee Bradbury, was arrested in 2011 for abusing three boys. He was 22 at the time and his victims were 9, 10 and 12. Bradbury was charged with two counts of sodomy; two counts of child molestation; one count of sexual misconduct; and one count of attempted sodomy. He pleaded guilty to four felony charges in 2013 and was sentenced to 10 years in prison.

In 2015, White was sued for being aware of the sexual abuse at his camp. Documents during civil court proceedings show that camp leaders were aware of Newman's inappropriate behavior, including nudity with children. A former staff member said Newman was recommended to be fired in 2003, but the complaints were dismissed.

While Kanakuk leadership claimed that Newman was a single outlier, reporters at the Springfield News-Leader identified reports of at least four other men who were associated with Kanakuk that sexually abused children through the organization. These men include Corbie Dale Grimes, Ed Ringheim, Paul Green, and Chuck Price, who were camp counselors and a program director.

In April 2021, No More Victims, LLC. published the website Facts About Kanakuk to provide information about the camp. They published an open letter demanding an independent investigation and called on leaders to release all victims from non-disclosure agreements. Missouri and Texas have both passed laws outlawing the use of NDAs in instances of child sexual abuse. The ban is known as Trey's Law and is named after Trey Carlock, a Dallas resident who attended Kanakuk as a child and later took his own life from trauma related to abuse by Newman.

Investigative reporting from journalists Nancy French and David French showed that camp leaders knew about Newman's behavior, and victims and family members have come forward with abuse they faced at Kanakuk.

Kanakuk released a statement on February 25, 2022, responding to the No More Victims website and civil lawsuits. They released a second statement on May 24, 2022.

In March 2025, Dallas-based D Magazine published a feature, "A Summer Camp of Horrors," about Kanakuk Kamps.

=== Cultural appropriation ===
Campers are divided into "tribes" and separated by gender when they arrive at camp. There are four total tribes, two for the female campers - Kiowa and Kickapoo - and two for the male campers - Cherokee and Choctaw. As part of the camp experience, some campers are nominated as a "chief" or "princess" of their tribe. These campers wear Indigenous regalia, such as war bonnets and loincloths that say "Chief" in English.

At some sermons, President Joe White has dressed up in a war bonnet to perform a type of Native American Hoop Dance in front of an audience as part of his sermon.

=== Segregation allegations ===
In 1991 a subsidized segregated set of camps called Kids Across America (KAA) was formed for "urban youth". KAA has a separate website and is an independent 501(c)(3) non-profit organization previously known as "The I'm Third Foundation" linked to the Kanakuk website through ministry partners and not listed directly as a Kanakuk Kamp location. Critics allege that "90% of KAA campers are African American, whereas more than 90% of the campers who attend the other six Kanakuk Kamps at full tuition are white" and that the scholarships available to students to go to Kanakuk Kamps are not advertised to KAA eligible families, indicating that Kanakuk does not want lower income youth at the regular Kanakuk Kamps. Critics also allege that some campers at KAA camps are escorted by police officers due to the demographics at the camp being marked as "dangerous."

== Lawsuits ==
As early as 2011, civil lawsuits against White and Kanakuk Kamps began. A civil suit from Taney County with an unnamed plaintiff alleged that Kanakuk Kamps CEO Kris Cooper and President Joe White knew and covered up Newman's sexual abuse.

In 2022, Logan Yandell filed a lawsuit against Joe White, Kanakuk Heritage and Kanakuk Ministries that alleged he was sexually abused during his attendance between 2005 and 2008 by former camp director Peter Newman, and that Kanakuk leadership knew about it. Yandell settled with Kanakuk Kamps in 2010 for an undisclosed amount and signed a non-disclosure agreement. Yandell was seeking a jury trial and $25,000 in damages.

In 2022, Kanakuk Kamps sued ACE American Insurance Co., accusing the insurance company of forcing the camp to cover up sexual abuse.

In April 2025, a civil lawsuit was filed in Taney County Circuit Court by a plaintiff identified as "Jane Doe," represented by attorneys Reed Martens and Robert Thrasher of the Kansas City-based law firm Monsees & Mayer, P.C. The lawsuit alleges that Kanakuk Kamps and its leadership, including CEO Joe White, knowingly concealed the actions of former camp director Peter Newman and misled the plaintiff into signing a non-disclosure agreement following her abuse. The filing claims fraudulent concealment and seeks damages for ongoing trauma.
