= Lift Our Voices =

Nonprofit organization against workplace harassment

- Abbreviation: LOV
- Formation: December 2019; 6 years ago
- Founders: Gretchen Carlson; Julie Roginsky
- Type: 501(c)(3) Nonprofit organization
- Legal status: Active
- Purpose: Advocacy against non-disclosure agreements and forced arbitration clauses in workplace sexual harassment, discrimination, and retaliation cases
- Headquarters: New York, New York
- Location: United States
- Website: liftourvoices.org

Lift Our Voices is an American nonprofit organization established in 2019 by journalist and television host Gretchen Carlson and Democratic Party strategist Julie Roginsky. The organization is dedicated to ending workplace abuses by eliminating non-disclosure agreements (NDAs) and forced arbitration clauses that prevent survivors of workplace sexual harassment, sexual assault, discrimination, and retaliation from speaking publicly about their experiences.

Lift Our Voices engages in public education and advocates for state and federal policy changes related to non-disclosure agreements and forced arbitration.

In 2022, co-founder Carlson played a significant role in working with members of Congress to pass the Ending Forced Arbitration of Sexual Assault and Sexual Harassment Act, which was signed into law by President Joe Biden in March 2022. Five years after the start of the MeToo movement, the law was singled out as one of the legislative changes to prevent workplace harassment.

== History ==
=== Founding ===
Lift Our Voices was established in New York following Carlson and Roginsky's experiences with alleged workplace misconduct, including sexual harassment and retaliation, at Fox News. Both women subsequently filed legal actions against the network and its former chairman and CEO Roger Ailes.

As part of their settlement agreements, Carlson and Roginsky were each required to sign non-disclosure agreements restricting their ability to speak publicly about their experiences. After Carlson’s experience, she was named one of Time Magazine's Time 100 list of the most influential people in 2017, with the essay on Carlson written by journalist Katie Couric.

Roginsky has also described experiencing a toxic workplace environment while working as a consultant on New Jersey Governor Phil Murphy's 2017 gubernatorial campaign, stating she was fired after reporting misconduct allegations from campaign staff and was later bound by an NDA that prevents her from warning others.

In 2019, the film Bombshell told the story of Carlson's experience at Fox, but due to her stringent non-disclosure agreement she was prevented from speaking about her experience with the filmmakers or actress Nicole Kidman, who portrayed Carlson. Her story and Ailes’s removal from Fox News after the allegations was documented in the Showtime miniseries The Loudest Voice, based on journalist Gabriel Sherman's book The Loudest Voice in the Room and with Carlson portrayed by Naomi Watts. Sherman also wrote about Carlson's experience in New York Magazine.

Roginsky, a Democratic political consultant who was a contributor at Fox, said that she had difficulties finding other opportunities as a contributor or television host after her lawsuit against Fox News, with an agent telling her that she did not want to be associated with someone who had sued a network. Roginsky alleged experiencing a toxic workplace environment while consulting for New Jersey Democratic gubernatorial candidate Phil Murphy in 2017.

== Activities ==
=== Legislative activity ===
Lift Our Voices has advocated for federal and state legislation addressing pre-dispute non-disclosure and non-disparagement agreements, and forced arbitration in cases of workplace sexual harassment and other misconduct. Carlson and Roginsky, have supported the passage of two landmark federal laws on this subject: the Ending Forced Arbitration of Sexual Assault and Sexual Harassment Act (2022) and the Speak Out Act (2022).

==== Ending Forced Arbitration of Sexual Assault and Sexual Harassment Act of 2021 ====
In July 2021, Carlson joined U.S. Senators Kirsten Gillibrand and the late Lindsey Graham, and Representatives Cheri Bustos (fmr. D-IL) and Ken Buck (R-CO), in introducing the bipartisan Ending Forced Arbitration of Sexual Assault and Sexual Harassment Act of 2021 (EFAA). The legislation prohibits enforcement of forced arbitration clauses in employment contracts for claims related to sexual assault and harassment.

The bill passed Congress with bipartisan support on February 10, 2022, with Carlson present on Capitol Hill. President Joe Biden signed the EFAA into law on March 3, 2022, with Carlson as the guest of honor and Roginsky in attendance.

In an interview with the National Press Club, Carlson and Roginsky called the bill a "model" for addressing workplace abuse allegations. Vanity Fair's Eric Lutz described the EFAA as "one of the biggest workplace reforms in history."

==== Speak Out Act ====
In June 2022, Carlson and Roginsky joined Representatives Lois Frankel (D-FL), Cheri Bustos, and Ken Buck (R-CO) as co-sponsors in introducing the bipartisan federal Speak Out Act into the House Representatives, which prohibits the enforcement of pre-dispute NDAs in employment contracts that would prevent employees from openly disclosing allegations of sexual assault or harassment in the workplace. Lead Senate co-sponsors included Senators Gillibrand (D-NY), Graham (R-SC), Marsha Blackburn (R-TN), and Mazie Hirono (D-HI).

A 2018 Harvard Business Review study by Orly Lobel found that more than one-third of the U.S. workforce was bound by predispute NDAs. Forbes senior contributor Kim Elsesser, who covers issues affecting women in the workplace, noted the figure in her 2022 coverage of the Speak Out Act's introduction.

Bloomberg Law described Lift Our Voices as a "pro-worker policy group" that had earlier helped pass a law ending mandatory arbitration for workers alleging #MeToo-related claims, with both efforts receiving bipartisan support in Congress. Bloomberg Law reporter Paige Smith noted in her 2022 coverage that while federal legislation on the subject had been proposed, "there's been much more action at the state level," citing NDA-restrictive laws passed in Washington State and California, as well as referencing Salesforce and Microsoft Corporation voluntarily limiting their own NDA use to ease this type of misconduct reporting.

President Biden signed the Speak Out Act into law on December 7, 2022.

==== Protecting Older Americans Act ====
The Protecting Older Americans Act would amend federal arbitration law to allow individuals alleging age discrimination – including disparate treatment, workplace harassment, or retaliation against workers aged 40 or older – to elect to pursue their claims in court rather than through arbitration, notwithstanding any predispute arbitration agreement, with courts rather than arbitrators deciding whether the law applies to a given case.

A December 2025 AARP survey, found that 69 percent (69%) of adults age 50 and older support congressional legislation to make forced arbitration illegal in age discrimination cases.

Lift Our Voices has supported the Protecting Older Americans Act since its original introduction in June 2023. The bipartisan bill, which would invalidate forced arbitration clauses in cases of workplace age discrimination, was reintroduced in the 119th Congress as S.2703 on September 3, 2025, by Senators Kirsten Gillibrand, the late Lindsey Graham, Chuck Grassley, and Dick Durbin, and referred to the Senate Judiciary Committee.

A companion bill, H.R.5115, was introduced in the House of Representatives. An earlier version of the bill was advanced by the Senate Judiciary Committee in a 15-6 vote on May 9, 2024, and formally reported to the full Senate a week later. Republican Senator John Cornyn opposed the bill in committee, arguing it would restrict access to arbitration as an affordable alternative to litigation, while Senator Cory Booker spoke in support, saying forced arbitration "obscur[es] how pervasive workforce discrimination can be from public view."

=== State legislative efforts ===
Lift Our Voices has advocated for state-level restrictions on workplace NDAs, including legislation enacted in New Jersey, California, and Washington State.

==== New York Stop Silencing Survivors Act ====
The Stop Silencing Survivors Act would amend New York's 'General Obligations Law' to prohibit employers from including non-disclosure or non-disparagement agreements in settlements or resolutions of alleged workplace discrimination or labor law violations, while still permitting a complainant to request that their identity and the circumstances of their complaint remain confidential.

Lift Our Voices has advocated for New York's Stop Silencing Survivors Act since state Senators Alessandra Biaggi and Andrew Gounardes and Assemblymember Jessica González-Rojas announced the legislation in April 2022. The bill has been reintroduced to each subsequent legislative session – as S4233 in the 2023-2024 session and as S5404, sponsored by Gounardes, in the current 2025-2026 session – but has not advanced beyond referral to the Senate Judiciary Committee.

At a press conference at the State Capitol on May 8, 2023, Carlson said, "The bill we're advocating for today would eliminate NDAs, not just for harassment and assault, but for all toxic workplace issues, including race, gender, sexual identity, age and disability discrimination. This bill puts the power back in the hands of the survivors."

State Senator Andrew Gounardes has described the measure as intended to restore NDAs to their original purpose of protecting trade secrets and proprietary information, rather than as a tool to suppress workplace misconduct victims. "What we're talking about here is banning a bribe," Gounardes said. "You are bribing someone to keep their mouth shut about the harm that they have done to you."

A February 2025 poll conducted for Lift Our Voices found that 56 percent (56%) of New York voters surveyed opposed the use of workplace NDAs, with 68 percent (68%) surveyed supporting a statewide ban. Carlson said the polling showed "voters in New York stand with workers and their right to speak out against discrimination."

==== Connecticut ====
In February 2025, Connecticut legislators introduced Senate Bill 1035 (SB 1035), which sought to limit the use of nondisclosure agreements by adopting provisions similar to those in California, New Jersey, and Washington State law. Carlson and Roginsky testified in support of the bill before the Connecticut General Assembly's Labor and Public Employee Committee.

SB 1035 would have voided nondisclosure and non-disparagement provisions covering conduct an employee reasonably believed to constitute discrimination, harassment, retaliation, a wage-and-hour violation, or sexual assault, while preserving employers' ability to protect trade secrets and proprietary information. As introduced by the committee, the bill would have taken effect October 1, 2025. The bill received favorable committee reports but did not receive a vote on the Senate floor before the 2025 session ended.

Substantially similar legislation was reintroduced in the 2026 session as Substitute Senate Bill 355 (sSB 355), which would have made prohibited non-disclosure and non-disparagement provisions unenforceable and would have taken effect October 1, 2026, had it passed. As with its predecessor, the bill received favorable committee reports but was not brought to a floor vote before the 2026 session concluded.

== Campaigns ==
=== #LOVJustice campaign ===
In 2024, Lift Our Voices launched the #LOVJustice campaign on the organization's website, a series of video testimonials from individuals who state that passage of the EFAA enabled them to speak publicly about experiences previously covered by forced arbitration or non-disclosure agreements.

=== LOV Where You Work survey ===
In December 2024, Lift Our Voices announced the "LOV Where You Work" initiative, a corporate accountability scoring survey inviting human resources executives at Russell 3000 equity companies to disclose their use of forced arbitration and NDAs in employee disputes, with surveys distributed beginning in January 2025 and the resulting index set to launch publicly that spring.

Carlson first described the concept, a "first-ever" rating of Russell 3000 companies on their use of workplace silencing mechanisms, at the 2023 Fast Company Innovation Festival. Survey questions asked human resources officers whether their companies use forced arbitration, whether NDAs are used outside of protecting intellectual property, and whether the companies are aware of federal laws on the subject. Responses would then be used to assess and grade company transparency, with the goal of identifying best practices and highlighting areas for improvement. The resulting index, according to the organization, was intended to serve as a resource for job seekers and workers evaluating potential employers. According to Axios, participation in the survey was voluntary. Carlson said the initiative was intended to encourage, rather than penalize, companies that had not yet adopted such practices: "We want to help carry them along to get to the right place. So we're not going to vilify them. We are simply giving them a soft nudge to get on the right side of history."

=== LOV Where You Work AI Tool ===
In May 2026, Lift Our Voices launched the LOV Where You Work AI Tool, a free public resource designed to help workers analyze employment documents — including NDAs, non-disparagement agreements, severance agreements, and arbitration provisions — and receive plain-language explanations of potential concerns. The tool was introduced at Ai4 2026, held August 4-6, 2026 at The Venetian in Las Vegas, during a panel moderated by Forbes contributor Ron Schmelzer featuring Carlson, Roginsky, and Brigham Young University professor James Gaskin. Schmelzer wrote that the tool "does not erase the imbalance between an individual applicant and a large employer, but it can change the amount of information each side brings to the table."

== Live speaking events ==
=== National Press Club ===
On March 29, 2022, Carlson and Roginsky appeared at a National Press Club Headliners Newsmaker in Washington, D.C., where they discussed the new federal law ending forced arbitration of sexual harassment and assault claims.

=== Yahoo MAKERS Conference ===
Carlson and Roginsky took part in a panel titled "NDAs & Forced Arbitration" at the 2024 MAKERS Conference, moderated by Leslie Russo. They spoke about their own experiences with NDAs and about legislative efforts to address NDAs and forced arbitration.

== Research, funding and education ==
Lift Our Voices has collaborated with research institutions including Stanford University's Michelle R. Clayman Institute for Gender Research to study the effects of workplace silencing mechanisms, informing the organization's advocacy strategies and public education efforts.

In research partially funded by Lift Our Voices, UC Davis School of Law professor David Horton reviewed numerous electronically accessible cases involving the Ending Forced Arbitration of Sexual Assault and Sexual Harassment Act decided between March 2022 and August 2025. Horton found that courts have disagreed over several important questions involving the law's scope, including what workers must allege to invoke its protections and whether claims beyond sexual harassment or assault can remain in court. His analysis concluded that broader interpretations of the statute generally have stronger support under textualist approaches to statutory interpretations.
