= All In Together =

US non-profit organization

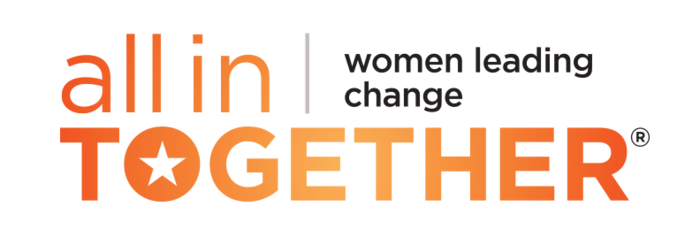
- Established: 2014; 12 years ago
- Founders: Lauren Leader, Courtney Emerson, Edda Collins Coleman
- Type: Non-profit organization
- Tax ID no.: 501(c)(3)
- Location: New York City, New York, United States
- Chief Executive: Lauren Leader
- Website: aitogether.org

All In Together (AIT) is an American non-profit organization. Founded in 2024, its stated mission to equip voting-age American women with nonpartisan civic education.

Their website describes the organization as a "non-partisan, collaboration-driven campaign to empower women with the tools they need to drive meaningful change..." The organization was founded by Lauren Leader, Courtney Emerson, and Edda Collins Coleman. Leader currently serves as the organization's CEO.

== Approach ==
All In Together is a nonpartisan women’s organization that aims to advance the progress of women’s political, civic, and professional leadership in the United States.

The organization has hosted workshops, seminars, industry forums, and Hill days. In 2017, All In Together launched a partnership with Gretchen Carlson titled the "Gretchen Carlson Leadership Initiative" meant to "bring civic leadership and advocacy training to thousands of underserved women across the country, with a special focus on empowering women who have experienced gender-based violence, discrimination, or harassment."

=== Founding sponsors, board, and advisors ===
All In Together's founding sponsors include Citigroup, Daimler AG, and other companies and organizations. Their advisors include representatives from PwC, MWWPR, Accenture, Ocrolus, Condé Nast, Target, and Wallace Global Impact.
