= Trey's Law =

Law banning NDAs in child sex abuse cases

Trey’s Law is an informal name given to legislation passed in Missouri (House Bill 737 and Senate Bill 81) and Texas (Senate Bill 835) forbidding the use of non-disclosure agreements in cases of child sexual abuse. Its namesake is Trey Carlock, a Texas man who suffered abuse at the hands of a camp counselor as a youth.

== Background ==
Raymon Byron Carlock III, otherwise known as Trey, was born on September 30, 1990 to R. Byron Carlock II and Laura (Barker) Carlock. Attending Cistercian Preparatory School and later Highland Park High School in the Dallas area, Carlock was a National Merit Scholar who excelled in sports as a child, including football, tennis, lacrosse, and cross-country.

It was during this period in life he attended Kanakuk Kamps in Branson, Missouri, where he came into contact with Pete Newman. According to his family, Newman abused Trey from the time he was 7 to the age of 17. Newman was later convicted of sexually abusing other campers and sentenced to two life terms in prison. Trey sought legal action against Kanakuk in relation to his abuse, but due to signing a non-disclosure agreement was unable to share his story.

Trey graduated summa cum laude from Harding University and pursued a career in neuroscience research, holding internships at Harvard University, the Massachusetts Institute of Technology, and Center for BrainHealth. He was also in the process of obtaining a Master’s degree from the University of Texas at Dallas. However, Trey was never able to heal from the experience he had at Kanakuk. On August 2019, Trey died by suicide.

== Legislation ==
After taking time to grieve Trey’s death, his older sister Elizabeth Phillips began speaking to legislators in Missouri and Texas to change the laws surrounding non-disclosure agreements in child sexual abuse cases. Missouri State Representative Brian Seitz and Senator Brad Hudson supported the legislation, which was passed in both chambers and signed into law by Governor Mike Kehoe on June 10, 2025, making any NDA signed after August 28 of that year unenforceable for claims of child sexual abuse. Meanwhile, in Texas, Representatives Jeff Leach and Morgan Meyer supported the bill with Senator Angela Paxton. Governor Greg Abbott signed the bill into law in June 2025, taking effect on September 1.
