= Escaping Polygamy =

American documentary television series

- Genre: Reality Television
- Starring: Jessica Christensen; Andrea Christensen; Shanell DeRieux
- Country of origin: United States
- Original language: English
- No. of seasons: 4
- No. of episodes: 39

Production
- Executive producers: Dee Haslam; Rob Lundgren; Lori Stryer
- Camera setup: Multi-camera
- Production company: RIVR Media

Original release
- Network: Lifetime
- Release: December 30, 2014 – April 22, 2019

Escaping Polygamy is an American docudrama television series that premiered on December 30, 2014, on LMN. The show aired on Lifetime (TV & online), but can also be viewed on Tubi and Court TV, and follows the work of three sisters who left the Davis County Cooperative Society, a polygamous group based in Salt Lake City known externally as the Kingston Group and internally as the Order, as they help family and friends break free of polygamy. They have also helped people escape from the FLDS and AUB churches. The show was originally on A&E, but later moved to Lifetime. The series was renewed for a fourth season on March 4, 2019, and premiered on Lifetime on April 1, 2019.

== Reception ==
Michelle Mueller, a researcher of religious studies, examined the potential sensationalization of polygamy by the docudrama series. Mueller argues that the show relies on "moral panic" as a motivating factor for viewership through Escaping Polygamy's references of high-profile cases of abuse within the Kingston Group and other polygamist sects, such as the conviction of David Ortell Kingston for incest and unlawful sexual conduct with his underage niece and jail time for John Daniel Kingston after pleading guilty to beating his daughter when she resisted marrying her uncle.

Since the fourth season aired, there has been no official announcement from Lifetime regarding the future of the show.
