= Speak Out Act =

United States legislation restricting non-disclosure agreements

- Long title: An Act to limit the judicial enforceability of predispute nondisclosure and nondisparagement contract clauses relating to disputes involving sexual assault and sexual harassment.
- Enacted by: the 117th United States Congress
- Effective: December 7, 2022

Citations
- Public law: Pub. L. 117–224 (text) (PDF)
- Statutes at Large: 136 Stat. 2290

Codification
- Titles amended: 42 U.S.C.: The Public Health and Welfare
- U.S.C. sections created: 42 U.S.C. § 19401, § 19402, § 19403, § 19404

Legislative history
- Introduced in the Senate as S. 4524 by Kirsten Gillibrand (D–NY) on July 13, 2022; Committee consideration by Senate Judiciary Committee; Passed the Senate on September 29, 2022 (by unanimous consent); Passed the House on November 16, 2022 (315–109); Signed into law by President Joe Biden on December 7, 2022

The Speak Out Act (S.4524) is an Act of Congress which prevents the enforcement of non-disclosure agreements in instances of sexual assault and harassment. Introduced by senator Kirsten Gillibrand of New York during the second session of the 117th Congress, the legislation was approved unanimously in the Senate and was passed by the House of Representatives by a vote of 315 to 109.

President Joe Biden signed the bill into law on December 7, 2022.

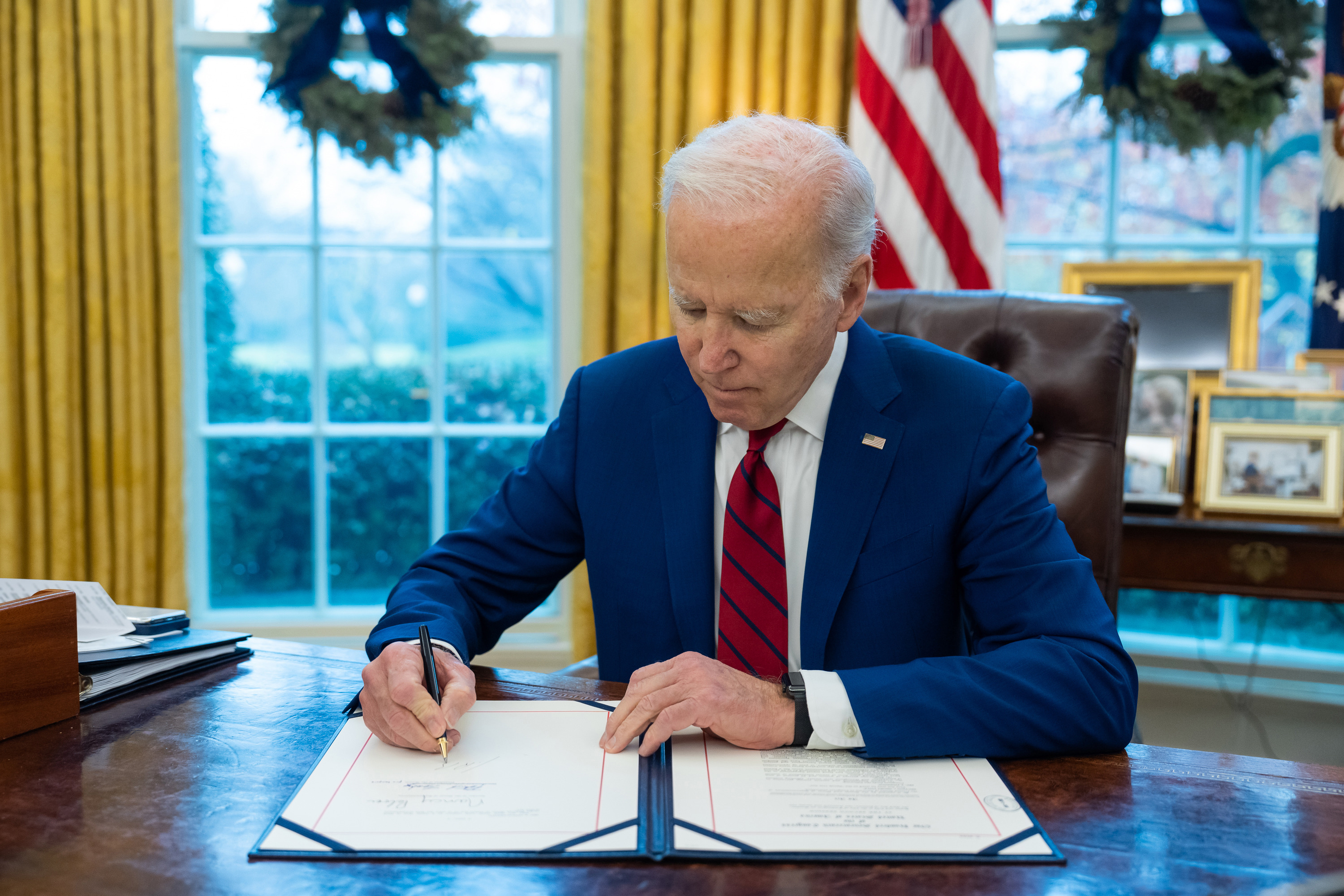
Biden signing the Speak Out Act into law

== Background ==
One of the MeToo movement's primary targets was the enactment of non-disclosure agreements, which MeToo leaders saw as a tool which sexual predators, especially within corporate American culture, could use in courts to prevent victims from raising concerns of inappropriate behaviors. Beginning mostly under the Biden administration, Congress has responded in a variety of ways, most notably passing the Ending Forced Arbitration of Sexual Assault and Sexual Harassment Act in March 2022, which bans the enforcement of arbitration clauses and class action waivers in cases of sexual harassment.

Former Fox News anchor Gretchen Carlson has been a major backer for both this bill as well as other MeToo inspired legislation. On the subject of non-disclosure agreements, Carlson called the vast outreach of the clauses "inane", and further indicated that many employees are pressured into signing these agreements on their first day of employment with a firm.

=== Congressional findings ===
In the text of the bill, Congress stated that it had found non-disclosure agreements to perpetuate illegal conduct. Congress also stated that while 81% of women had experienced sexual harassment and assault at work, 43% of men had also experienced similar treatment, and that the freedom to report such conduct should not be inhibited, which banning non-disclosure agreements would enable.

== Legislative history ==
The bill was first introduced in July 2022 in the Senate by senator Kirsten Gillibrand with 9 Democratic and 5 Republican cosponsors, including judiciary committee chair Dick Durbin and ranking member Chuck Grassley. The bill passed the Senate with unanimous consent on September 29, 2022.

The bill passed the house on November 16, 2022. Of the representatives voting, all 215 Democrats and 100 Republicans voted in favor, with 109 GOP members not supporting the legislation. Both parties' major leadership, including Steny Hoyer and Jim Clyburn on the Democratic side and Kevin McCarthy, Elise Stefanik and Steve Scalise on the Republican side, supported the bill's passage.

Following completion of its Congressional stages, President Joe Biden signed the bill into law on December 7, 2022.

== Aftermath ==
=== Tiger Woods ===
The Speak Out Act came to prominence in March 2023, when professional golfer Tiger Woods was sued by former girlfriend Erica Herman and petitioned a judge to remove her from a 2017 NDA she signed with Woods. Herman's complaint cites the Speak Out Act and expresses belief that her NDA with Woods is invalid and unenforceable, though her complaint stated she was unsure on whether the non-disclosure agreement would enable discussions about her life with others.

=== Vin Diesel ===
Former assistant Asta Jonasson filed a lawsuit against Vin Diesel for sexual battery.
