= Non-disclosure agreement =

Contractual agreement not to disclose specified information

A non-disclosure agreement (NDA), also known as a confidentiality agreement (CA), confidential disclosure agreement (CDA), proprietary information agreement (PIA), or secrecy agreement (SA), is a legal contract or part of a contract between at least two parties that outlines confidential material, knowledge, or information that the parties wish to share with one another for certain purposes, but wish to restrict access to.

It is a contract through which the parties agree not to disclose any information covered by the agreement. An NDA creates a confidential relationship between the parties, typically to protect any type of confidential and proprietary information or trade secrets. As such, an NDA protects non-public business information. Like all contracts, they cannot be enforced if the contracted activities are illegal. NDAs are commonly signed when two companies, individuals, or other entities (such as partnerships, societies, etc.) are considering doing business and need to understand the processes used in each other's business for the purpose of evaluating the potential business relationship. NDAs can be "mutual", meaning both parties are restricted in their use of the materials provided, or they can restrict the use of materials by a single party. An employee can be required to sign an NDA or NDA-like agreement with an employer, protecting trade secrets. In fact, some employment agreements include a clause restricting employees' use and dissemination of company-owned confidential information. In legal disputes resolved by settlement, the parties often sign a confidentiality agreement relating to the terms of the settlement. Examples of such agreements are The Dolby Trademark Agreement with Dolby Laboratories, the Windows Insider Agreement, and the Halo CFP (Community Feedback Program) with Microsoft.

In some cases, employees who are dismissed following their complaints about unacceptable practices (whistleblowers), or discrimination against and harassment of themselves, may be paid compensation subject to an NDA forbidding them from disclosing the events complained about. Such conditions in an NDA may not be enforceable by law, although they may intimidate the former employee into silence.

A similar concept is expressed in the term "non-disparagement agreement", which prevents one party from stating anything "derogatory" about the other party.

== General types ==
A non-disclosure agreement (NDA) may be classified as unilateral, bilateral, or multilateral:

=== Unilateral ===
A unilateral NDA, sometimes referred to as a one-way NDA, involves two parties where only one party (i.e., the disclosing party) anticipates disclosing certain information to the other party (i.e., the receiving party) and requires that the information be protected from further disclosure for some reason (e.g., maintaining the secrecy necessary to satisfy patent laws or legal protection for trade secrets, limiting disclosure of information prior to issuing a press release for a major announcement, or simply ensuring that a receiving party does not use or disclose information without compensating the disclosing party).

=== Bilateral ===
A bilateral NDA (sometimes referred to as a mutual NDA, MNDA, or a two-way NDA) involves two parties where both parties anticipate disclosing information to one another that each intends to protect from further disclosure. This type of NDA is common for businesses considering some kind of joint venture or merger.

When presented with a unilateral NDA, some parties may insist upon a bilateral NDA, even though they anticipate that only one of the parties will disclose information under the NDA. This approach is intended to incentivize the drafter to make the provisions in the NDA more "fair and balanced" by introducing the possibility that a receiving party could later become a disclosing party or vice versa, which is not an entirely uncommon occurrence.

=== Multilateral ===
A multilateral NDA involves three or more parties where at least one of the parties anticipates disclosing information to the other parties and requires that the information be protected from further disclosure. This type of NDA eliminates the need for separate unilateral or bilateral NDAs between only two parties. E.g., a single multiparty NDA entered into by three parties who each intend to disclose information to the other two parties could be used in place of three separate bilateral NDAs between the first and second parties, second and third parties, and third and first parties.

A multilateral NDA can be advantageous because the parties involved review, execute, and implement just one agreement. This advantage can be offset by more complex negotiations that may be required for the parties involved to reach a unanimous consensus on a multilateral agreement.

== Content ==
An NDA can protect any type of information that is not generally known. They may also contain clauses that will protect the person receiving the information so that if they lawfully obtained the information through other sources they would not be obligated to keep the information secret. In other words, the NDA typically only requires the receiving party to maintain information in confidence when that information has been directly supplied by the disclosing party.

Some common issues addressed in an NDA include:

- outlining the parties to the agreement;
- whether confidential information must be labeled as confidential
- the definition of what is confidential, i.e. the information to be held confidential. Modern NDAs will typically include a laundry list of types of items that are covered, including unpublished patent applications, know-how, schema, financial information, verbal representations, customer lists, vendor lists, business practices/strategies, etc.;
- the disclosure period – information not disclosed during the disclosure period (e.g., one year after the date of the NDA) is not deemed confidential;
- the exclusions from what must be kept confidential. Typically, the restrictions on the disclosure or use of confidential data will be invalid if
  - the recipient had prior knowledge of the materials;
  - the recipient gained subsequent knowledge of the materials from another source;
  - the materials are generally available to the public; or
  - the materials are subject to a subpoena
- provisions restricting the transfer of data in violation of laws governing export control and national security;
- the term and conditions (in years) of the confidentiality, i.e. the time period of confidentiality;
- the term (in years) the agreement is binding;
- permission to obtain ex-parte injunctive relief;
- description of the actions that need to be done with the confidential materials upon the agreement ending;
- what/when it can be modified by a court
- the obligations of the recipient regarding the confidential information, typically including some version of obligations:
  - to use the information only for enumerated purposes;
  - to disclose it only to persons with a need to know the information for those purposes;
  - to use appropriate efforts (not less than reasonable efforts) to keep the information secure. Reasonable efforts is often defined as a standard of care relating to confidential information that is no less rigorous than that which the recipient uses to keep its own similar information secure; and
  - to ensure that anyone to whom the information is disclosed further abides by obligations restricting use, restricting disclosure, and ensuring security at least as protective as the agreement; and
  - destruction or return upon request
- types of permissible disclosure – such as those required by law or court order (many NDAs require the receiving party to give the disclosing party prompt notice of any efforts to obtain such disclosure, and possibly to cooperate with any attempt by the disclosing party to seek judicial protection for the relevant confidential information).
- the law and jurisdiction governing the parties. The parties may choose the exclusive jurisdiction of a court of a country.
- whether or not juries, arbitration allowed
- who owns or has rights over the information

== Abuse of NDAs ==
While the purpose of NDAs is to prevent disclosure of confidential information, they are very often misused by powerful companies and people to prevent employees who have been abused, often sexually, harassed, or discriminated against from disclosing the fact, usually in return for payment. There have been high-profile cases linked to the #MeToo movement, and many cases involving workers in regular employment, who do not have the financial means or confidence to challenge their employers' "gagging orders".

For example, employees suffering abuse by Harvey Weinstein, co-founder and at the time co-chairman of Miramax Films, were forced to negotiate a non-disclosure agreement with Miramax with terms that prohibited them not only from public disclosure, but also from speaking to a doctor, counsellor or accountant without them also signing an NDA, which the employees would be held accountable to if a third party broke it. They were required to use their "best endeavours" not to disclose anything in a civil or criminal case brought against Weinstein.

An American documentary film released in 2026, My NDA, follows three individuals bound by NDAs to show how they are weaponized to silence people from speaking out about misconduct. It also follows the enactment of the in California, United States.

== Law and practice by jurisdiction ==
=== Australia ===
Deeds of confidentiality and fidelity (also referred to as deeds of confidentiality or confidentiality deeds) are commonly used in Australia. These documents generally serve the same purpose as and contain provisions similar to NDAs used elsewhere.

=== India ===
NDAs are used in India. They have been described as "an increasingly popular way of restricting the loss of R&D knowledge through employee turnover in Indian IT firms". They are often used by companies from other countries who are outsourcing or offshoring work to companies in India. Companies outsourcing research and development of biopharma to India use them, and Indian companies in pharmaceuticals are "competent" in their use. In the space industry, NDAs "are crucial". "Non-disclosure and confidentiality agreements ... are ... generally enforceable as long as they are reasonable." Sometimes NDAs have been anti-competitive and this has led to legal challenges.

=== United Kingdom ===
In the United Kingdom, the term "back-to-back agreement" refers to an NDA entered into with a third party who legitimately receives confidential information, putting them under similar non-disclosure obligations as the initial party granted the information. Case law in a 2013 Court of Appeal decision (Dorchester Project Management v BNP Paribas) confirmed that a confidentiality agreement will be interpreted as a contract subject to the rules of contractual interpretation which generally apply in English courts.

NDAs are often used as a condition of a financial settlement in an attempt to silence whistleblowing employees from making public the misdeeds of their former employers. There is a law, the Public Interest Disclosure Act 1998, which allows "protected disclosure" despite the existence of an NDA, although employers sometimes intimidate the former employee into silence despite this.

In some legal cases where the conditions of a confidentiality agreement have been breached, the successful party may choose between damages based on an account of the commercial profits which might have been earned if the agreement had been honoured, or damages based on the price of releasing the other party from its obligations under the agreement.

Commercial entities entering into confidentiality agreements need to ensure that the scope of their agreement does not go beyond what is necessary to protect commercial information. In the case of Jones v Ricoh, heard by the High Court in 2010, Jones brought an action against the photocopier manufacturer Ricoh for breach of their confidentiality agreement when Ricoh submitted a tender for a contract with a third party. Ricoh sought release from its obligations under the agreement via an application for summary judgment, and the court agreed that the relevant wording "went further than could reasonably be required" to protect commercial information. The agreement was held to be in breach of Article 101 of the Treaty on the Functioning of the European Union, which prohibits agreements which had the object or effect of distorting competition, and was therefore unenforceable.

In the United Kingdom there were plans from 2018 to introduce legislation to make confidentiality clauses in settlement agreements prohibiting a worker from making an allegation of harassment or discrimination null and void. In 2025 a bill progressing through Parliament would ban such clauses, while not banning legitimate commercial use to protect commercially sensitive information or intellectual property in business transactions.

As of 2025 NDAs have long been misused in the UK to prevent people, usually employees, from reporting sexual and other abuse they have suffered. Parliament has consulted regarding proposed legislation to curb such use, with a debate on the use of NDAs by employers to cover up workplace abuse and discrimination. In July 2025 a bill progressing through Parliament would make confidentiality clauses in settlement agreements prohibiting a worker from making an allegation of harassment or discrimination null and void, while not banning legitimate commercial use to protect commercially sensitive information or intellectual property in business transactions. A survey of employers found that 48% of employers would support a ban, 18% opposed, 20% were ambivalent, and 14% did not know.

=== Ireland ===
In Ireland, confidentiality agreements or non-disclosure agreements are affected by the Maternity Protection, Employment Equality and Preservation of Certain Records Act 2024. The Act amends the Employment Equality Act 1998 by restricting the use of non-disclosure agreements (NDA).

The 2024 Act renders void any NDA that prohibits an employee from disclosing:

- An allegation that s/he has experienced discrimination, harassment, sexual harassment or victimisation regarding his/her employment or potential employment, or
- Any action taken by an employer or employee in response to the making of such an allegation, including any proceedings taken by the employee.

=== United States ===
NDAs are very common in the United States, with more than one-third of jobs in America containing an NDA. Researchers estimate that between 33% and 57% of U.S. workers are constrained by an NDA or similar mechanism. According to a study by Lift Our Voices, co-founded by Gretchen Carlson and Julie Roginsky, in January 2026, nearly half of the workforce is bound by concealment clauses. As of July 2026, 19 states have laws that restrict NDAs in some way.

Some states, including California, recognise special circumstances relating to NDAs and non-compete clauses. California's courts and legislature have signalled that they generally value an employee's mobility and entrepreneurship more highly than they do protectionist doctrine.

==== Speak Out Act ====
The United States Congress passed the Speak Out Act in 2022, which prohibits them in regard to sexual harassment and sexual assault, and the bill was signed into law by President Joe Biden on December 7, 2022. The bill was championed by Lift Our Voices.

==== Trey's Law ====
Five states outlaw NDAs in instances of child sexual abuse. In Missouri and Texas, this ban is known as Trey's Law, named after Trey Carlock, a Dallas resident who attended Kanakuk Kamps as a child. He took his own life after suffering abuse at the hands of a counselor.

==== Silenced No More Act ====
As of July 2026, three states have banned the use of NDAs in employment contracts broadly against various unlawful workplace behavior and two other states have introduced similar legislature.

===== California =====
In January 2022, a bill authored by former Pinterest employee Ifeoma Ozoma and Senator Connie Leyva became effective as a law that protects employees who speak about harassment and discrimination even if they've signed an NDA. However, employees can agree to an NDA. Studies have found that the law has had no negative impact on settlement rates or amounts.

===== Connecticut =====
In 2026, Connecticut introduced a bill (Senate Bill 355) to restrict the use of NDAs under the Connecticut Fair Employment Practices Act. Janel Grant, a former WWE employee who sued her former employer and Vince McMahon for being forced to sign an NDA preventing her from speaking out about sexual assault and sex trafficking, spoke out in support of the bill. Carlson and Roginsky began pushing the state to enact a ban on such NDAs in 2023.

===== Massachusetts =====
In 2022, Senator Diana DiZoglio introduced several bills to prevent NDAs from being used in cases of harassment and discrimination. She argued that the state should follow California and Washington's lead. As of April 2026, no such laws had been passed.

===== New Jersey =====
New Jersey Bill S121 became law in 2019. It bans the use of NDAs in employment contracts and settlements involving retaliation, harassment, and discrimination.

===== New York =====
New York bars the use of NDAs unless the employee "requested" it. In 2026, legislation (Senate Bill S5404) was introduced to ban them outright in cases of discrimination, abuse, and harassment. Polling done in 2025 showed that the majority of the state's voters support such legislation.

===== Washington =====
In 2022, Washington House Bill 1795 was signed into law. It retroactively bans the use of NDAs in cases of unlawful workplace conduct. Employers who violate the law are fined actual or statutory damages and attorney's fees. The law, sponsored by lawmakers Liz Berry and Karen Keiser, was inspired by former Apple worker Cher Scarlett and former Google employee Chelsey Glasson. The law is considered to be the most restrictive in the United States.

== See also ==
- Arrow information paradox
- Attorney–client privilege
- Bank–client confidentiality
- Due diligence
- Executive session
- Gag order
- Non-compete clause
- Physician–patient privilege
- Severance package
