= Greater Twin Cities Youth Symphonies =

Background information
- Origin: Twin Cities, Minnesota, USA

Greater Twin Cities Youth Symphonies (GTCYS) is a group of youth orchestras in the Twin Cities in Minnesota. Founded in 1972, GTCYS has served over 16,000 musicians and put on more than 500 concerts. The top orchestra has also traveled on more than a dozen national and international tours. GTCYS currently features 11 orchestras for young musicians any age through high school.

GTCYS is a youth orchestra program based in the Greater Twin Cities metro that draws over 900 students from eastern Minnesota and western Wisconsin. Its artistic director is Mark Russell Smith, who also conducts the top orchestra, Symphony.

In 2011, GTCYS and the SPCO formed a strategic partnership to serve the community through music and build classical music audiences.

== Orchestras ==
There are eleven school-year orchestras ranging from beginning to pre-professional levels. All of the orchestras require an audition to place students in an orchestra that meets their abilities. Auditions are held in the spring prior to the following school-year. Auditions for limited openings in the second semester are open in the winter.

The orchestras, in order of beginning to advanced, are:

Philharmonia East and Philharmonia West.

- These orchestras do not have any woodwind, brass, or percussion instruments.

Sinfonia East and Sinfonia West.

- These orchestras include brass, percussion, and woodwinds. The auditions are more difficult and require harder audition pieces and more scales.

Concertino East and Concertino West.

- These orchestras include brass, percussion, and woodwinds. The auditions now become more difficult and require harder audition pieces and more scales.

Camerata Vivace and Camerata Con Brio

- These orchestras include brass, percussion, and woodwinds. The auditions now become slightly more difficult and require harder audition pieces and more scales.

Concert Orchestra

- This orchestra is the first to regularly play unedited works for orchestra.

Philharmonic

- In this orchestra, students begin to tackle the more difficult works in the professional orchestral repertoire.

Symphony

- GTCYS' flagship orchestra, Symphony has the most advanced set of music and players. Symphony tours internationally biennially, and studies a symphony work and performs it in its entirety.

Concerts have been performed at notable venues in the Twin Cities such as Orchestra Hall, Ted Mann Concert Hall, and the Ordway Center for the Performing Arts. GTCYS orchestras have also performed around the world in such venues as the Sydney Opera House and the Krzysztof Penderecki European Centre for Music in Poland. Symphony, the flagship orchestra, traveled to Spain during the summer of 2014 by invitation to the Granada International Festival of Music and Dance. In 2016, Symphony travelled to Argentina with major concerts in Buenos Aires, Rosario, and Santa Fe. In 2018, Symphony travelled to Germany, Poland, and Hungary with major concerts in Wrocław, Kraków, the Krzysztof Penderecki European Centre for Music, and Budapest. The orchestra also had the opportunity to attend a concert by the Berlin Philharmonic, participate in a workshop with Berlin Philharmonic cellist Stephan Koncz while in Germany, and visit Auschwitz. In 2022, Symphony traveled to southern Italy, postponed from June 2020 due to the ongoing COVID-19 pandemic. Notable performances on these tours included performing as part of the opening concert for the Taormina Art Festival and at the Chiesa di Sant' Ignazio di Loyola in Rome. In 2024, Symphony toured from southern France to Barcelona, Spain. At their final destination, the orchestra performed at the Palau de la Música Catalana. In 2026, Symphony will tour Australia and New Zealand, with a capstone concert at the Sydney Opera House.
