= The Real Story (TV program) =

- former title card for The Real Story before Carlson's departure.
- Genre: Current affairs program
- Presented by: Former host: Gretchen Carlson (2013–2016); Regular: Sandra Smith; Harris Faulkner; Dana Perino; Kimberly Guilfoyle; Heather Childers; Shannon Bream; Martha McCallum
- Country of origin: United States
- Original language: English

Production
- Production location: New York City
- Camera setup: Multi-camera
- Running time: 60 minutes

Original release
- Network: Fox News Channel
- Release: September 30, 2013 – July 29, 2016

The Real Story is an American current affairs television program hosted by journalist Gretchen Carlson on the Fox News Channel. Prior to its cancellation, the show was hosted by a rotation of anchors following the expiration of Carlson's contract with Fox News in late June 2016. During Carlson's tenure with the show, it was known as The Real Story with Gretchen Carlson.

Since its debut on September 30, 2013, the show was broadcast live from 2:00 p.m. to 3:00 p.m. ET. The program was a replacement for America Live with Megyn Kelly following Kelly's departure from that time slot to host her own Fox prime time program, The Kelly File.

The program aired its final episode on July 29, 2016. The following Monday, August 1, 2016, the show and its 'about' page was removed from Fox News' schedule and website. It was replaced by America's Election Headquarters hosted by Shannon Bream.

Preceded by Happening Now	The Real Story; 2:00 PM –3:00 PM	Succeeded by Shepard Smith Reporting
