= Diana Falzone =

American journalist

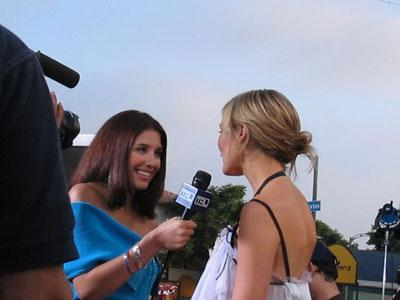
- Falzone in 2008
- Born: West Milford, New Jersey, U.S.
- Education: New School (2005)
- Occupation: Journalist
- Children: 1

Diana Falzone is an American journalist. Falzone is a contributing reporter for The Daily Beast. and her work has also been seen in Vanity Fair, Vice News and Buzzfeed. She is a former reporter for FoxNews.com and the former host of Fox411. She is a former host of Maxim magazine and Sirius XM Indie.

== Early life and education ==
Falzone grew up in West Milford, New Jersey. She graduated from The New School in 2005 with a bachelor's degree in psychology.

== Gender and disability discrimination lawsuit against Fox News ==
In January 2017, Falzone wrote an article published on the Fox News website revealing that she suffered from endometriosis, a condition that rendered her infertile: "It was just days after my 33rd birthday when my doctor delivered the worst news of my life: I will likely never have a child and fulfill my greatest wish of being a mother.... When hit with the news that I am infertile, I could not stop crying. And not only was it very unlikely I'd ever conceive, my health was in jeopardy." Falzone alleges that she sought Fox News' approval to publish an article before publication.

In May 2017, Falzone filed a lawsuit against Fox News in New York State Supreme Court alleging gender and disability discrimination, and alleging that she had been banned from taking part in on-air activities at Fox News three days after the article was published. Falzone further alleged that after the article ran, a supervisor informed her that senior network executives Bill Shine and Jack Abernethy had banned her from ever appearing on FoxNews.com, and that she was not permitted to host her own shows, conduct her own interviews, appear on Fox TV, or do voiceovers, and that she should look for another job. Falzone alleges that she filed a formal complaint of discrimination through the 21st Century Fox hotline, but Fox declined to put her back on the air or otherwise redress her complaint. Her attorneys argue in the complaint that the revelation regarding Falzone's infertility, "detracted from her sex appeal and made her less desirable" in the eyes of the "male-dominated senior management of Fox News."

Fox News Co-President Bill Shine, who was named in Falzone's complaint, resigned from his position at Fox News in May 2017.

On March 8, 2018, it was made public that Falzone's case against Fox News had been settled and she had left their employment.

Falzone gave birth to a baby boy on 5 August 2018.

== Stormy Daniels–Donald Trump story ==
In the March 11, 2019 issue of The New Yorker, Jane Mayer reported Falzone had obtained proof that Trump had engaged in a sexual relationship in 2006 with Stephanie Clifford ("Stormy Daniels"), but Ken LaCorte told her the story was killed because "Rupert wants Donald Trump to win. So just let it go." Falzone later discovered that the National Enquirer had made a "catch and kill" deal regarding Daniels for Trump, and Fox did not run that either. The story remained unknown to the public until a year after Trump became President, when The Wall Street Journal news broke of Trump's alleged payoffs as compensation to Daniels for her agreement to a non disclosure agreement, and then-Trump attorney Michael Cohen's criminal attempts to conceal them as legal fees.

On March 14, 2019, NBC News reported that Falzone "plans to tell Congress about allegations that the outlet [Fox News] tried to stop her from reporting on the Stormy Daniels controversy during the 2016 election, citing an exception to a nondisclosure agreement she signed", in response to a request from House Oversight Committee Chair Elijah Cummings that she talk to committee investigators and provide documents. Falzone's lawyer stated that her client would comply with the committee request, noting that a government inquiry "trumps an NDA.... No NDA can prevent anybody from participating in a government investigation".

== See also ==
- Donald Trump sexual misconduct allegations
