= Maybrick =

Maybrick is a surname. Notable people with the surname include:

- Florence Maybrick (1862–1941), American murderer
- James Maybrick (1838–1889), English cotton merchant
- Michael Maybrick (1841–1913), English composer and singer
