= The Black Museum (radio series) =

Radio crime-drama program

The original radio program was reissued in an audiobook format by Heritage Media.

The Black Museum is a radio crime-drama program produced by Harry Alan Towers, which was broadcast in the USA on the Mutual network in 1952. It was then broadcast in Europe in 1953 on Radio Luxembourg, a commercial radio station, and was not broadcast by the BBC until 1991.

Towers was based in London, but this series was recorded in Sydney, Australia. In 1946 Towers and his mother, Margaret Miller Towers, started a company called Towers of London that sold various syndicated radio shows around the world, including The Lives of Harry Lime with Orson Welles, The Secrets of Scotland Yard with Clive Brook, Horatio Hornblower with Michael Redgrave, and a series of Sherlock Holmes stories featuring John Gielgud as Holmes, Ralph Richardson as Watson and Welles as Moriarty.

Towers visited Australia in the late 1940s and set up production facilities in Sydney. The Black Museum was produced in Sydney by Creswick Jenkinson on behalf of Towers of London. It had a top-line Australian cast including Joe McCormick, plus American actor Harp McGuire. Orson Welles's introductions were recorded on tape in London, then flown to Australia to be added to the locally recorded performances. This was the first series to be produced in Australia in this way.

The Black Museum was based on real-life cases from the files of Scotland Yard's Black Museum. The programme was transcribed in 1951 and was broadcast in the United States in 1952 on Mutual. More than 500 of the network's stations carried it. Ira Marion was the scriptwriter and music for the series was composed and conducted by Sidney Torch. This same music was used for the opening credits of, and incidental music in, the 1955 film They Can't Hang Me, starring Terence Morgan.

Orson Welles was both host and narrator of stories of horror and mystery, based on Scotland Yard's collection of murder weapons and various ordinary objects once associated with historical true crime cases. The show's opening began:

"This is Orson Welles, speaking from London.
(Sound of Big Ben chimes)
The Black Museum ... a repository of death. Here in the grim stone structure on the Thames which houses Scotland Yard is a warehouse of homicide, where everyday objects ... a woman’s shoe, a tiny white box, a quilted robe ... all are touched by murder."

Robert Rietti played the lead roles and Keith Pyott was often in the cast.

In 2002, Towers produced The Black Museum for television and hired director Gregory Mackenzie to be the showrunner and director for the anthology series using the original narration by Welles. The adaptation was shot on location in London in a film noir style and the pilot starred Michael York as Scotland Yard Inspector Russell.

== Programme format and themes ==
Walking through the museum, Welles would direct attention to one or two objects with a comment about them, then pause at the specific exhibit, his description of the artifact serving as a device to lead into a wryly narrated dramatized tale of a brutal murder or a vicious crime connected to the artifact. In the closing: "Now until we meet again in the same place and I tell you another tale of the Black Museum", Welles would conclude with his signature radio phrase, "I remain, as always, obediently yours".

With the story themes deriving from objects in the collection (usually with the names of the people involved changed but the facts remaining true to history), the 51 episodes had such titles as "The Tartan Scarf" and "A Piece of Iron Chain" or "Frosted Glass Shards" and "A Khaki Handkerchief". An anomaly to the series was an episode called "The Letter", as this was the only story not about murder but about forgery.

== Broadcast history ==
In the United States, the series aired on the Mutual Network in 1952. It was rebroadcast on KABC, Los Angeles, California, in 1963–1964 and on KUAC (FM) in Fairbanks, Alaska, in 1967.

Beginning on 7 May 1953, it was also broadcast over Radio Luxembourg, sponsored by the cleaning products Dreft and Mirro. Since the BBC carried no commercials, Radio Luxembourg aired sponsored programmes broadcast at night to the UK.

In the United States, there was a contemporary programme called Whitehall 1212 written and directed by Wyllis Cooper and broadcast by NBC, that was similar in scope to The Black Museum. It was hosted by Chief Superintendent John Davidson, curator of the Black Museum. It used many of the same selected cases as The Black Museum, and it nearly mirrored its broadcast run. The two shows were different in the respect that, while Whitehall 1212 told the story of a case entirely from the point of view of the police, starting from the crime scene, The Black Museum was more heavily dramatised and played out scenes of the actual murders and included scenes from the criminal's point of view.

== Episodes ==
The following episodes were broadcast:

- Black Museum – 01 The .22 Caliber Pistol AKA Little Blue 22
- Black Museum – 02 .32 Calibre Bullet
- Black Museum – 03 Bath Tub
- Black Museum – 04 The Black Gladstone Bag
- Black Museum – 05 The Brick
- Black Museum – 06 The Brass Button
- Black Museum – 07 Can of Weed Killer
- Black Museum – 08 Canvas Bag
- Black Museum – 09 The Car Tire
- Black Museum – 10 The Champagne Glass
- Black Museum – 11 A Claw Hammer
- Black Museum – 12 Door Key
- Black Museum – 13 Faded Tartan Scarf AKA The Yellow Scarf
- Black Museum – 14 Four Small Bottles
- Black Museum – 15 French–English Dictionary
- Black Museum – 16 Gas Receipt
- Black Museum – 17 Frosted Glass Shards
- Black Museum – 18 The Hammerhead
- Black Museum – 19 The Jack Handle
- Black Museum – 20 Jar of Acid
- Black Museum – 21 The Khaki Handkerchief
- Black Museum – 22 A Lady's Shoe
- Black Museum – 23 The Leather Bag
- Black Museum – 24 A Letter
- Black Museum – 25 The Mandolin String
- Black Museum – 26 Meat Juice
- Black Museum – 27 The Notes
- Black Museum – 28 The Old Wooden Mallet
- Black Museum – 29 The Open End Wrench
- Black Museum – 30 A Pair Of Spectacles
- Black Museum – 31 A Piece Of Iron Chain
- Black Museum – 32 The Pink Powderpuff
- Black Museum – 33 The Post Card
- Black Museum – 34 A Prescription
- Black Museum – 35 The Raincoat
- Black Museum – 36 Length of Sash Cord
- Black Museum – 37 Auto Service Card
- Black Museum – 38 The Sheath Knife
- Black Museum – 39 The Shopping Bag
- Black Museum – 40 Shilling
- Black Museum – 41 A Silencer
- Black Museum – 42 The Small White Boxes
- Black Museum – 43 The Spotted Bedsheet
- Black Museum – 44 The Straight Razor
- Black Museum – 45 The Tan Shoe
- Black Museum – 46 The Telegram
- Black Museum – 47 The Trunk
- Black Museum – 48 Two Bullets
- Black Museum – 49 Walking Stick
- Black Museum – 50 A Women's Pigskin Glove
- Black Museum – 51 The Wool Jacket

== Cases ==
Based on original research and comparisons of the episode plot with the facts of the actual case, the below-listed Metropolitan Police cases were probably used as the basis for episodes of The Black Museum:

- Thomas Henry Allaway – "The Telegram"
- Major Herbert Rowse Armstrong – "The Champagne Glass"
- Elvira Barney – "The .22 Calibre Pistol"
- Adelaide Bartlett – "Four Small Bottles"
- Frederick Browne & William Kennedy – "The Car Tyre" & "The Gas Receipt"
- James Camb – "The Spotted Bedsheet"
- George Chapman – "The Straight Razor"
- Christopher Craig & Derek Bentley – "Two Bullets"
- John Alexander Dickman – "The Tan Shoe" & "The Leather Bag"
- Samuel Herbert Dougal – "The Lady's Shoe"
- Miles Giffard – "The Service Card"
- Harold Greenwood – "Weed Killer"
- John George Haigh – "The Jar of Acid"
- Neville Heath – "The Powder Puff"
- Harold Hill – "The Khaki Handkerchief"
- Karl Hulton & Elizabeth Jones – "The Jack Handle"
- Charles Jenkins, Christopher Geraghty & Terence Rolt – "The .32 Calibre Bullet"
- Patrick Mahon – "The Gladstone Bag"
- Toni Mancini – "The Hammerhead"
- Florence Maybrick – "Meat Juice"
- William Henry Podmore – "The Receipt"
- Dr. Edward Pritchard – "The Walking Stick"
- Florence Ransom – "A Woman's Pigskin Glove"
- John Robinson – "The Trunk"
- Alfred Arthur Rouse – "The Mallet"
- Edith Thompson and Frederick Bywaters – "The Sheath Knife"
- August Sangret – "The Brass Button"
- James Townsend Saward (alias "Jim the Penman") – "The Letter"
- Henry Daniel Seymour – "The Claw Hammer"
- George Joseph Smith – "The Bath Tub"
- Madeleine Smith – "Small White Boxes"
- Frederick Stewart – "The Frosted Glass Shards"
- George Stoner – "The Brickbat"
- Norman Thorne – "The Wool Jacket" & "The Spectacles"
- Jean-Pierre Vaquier – "The Dictionary"
- Nurse Dorothea Waddingham – "The Prescription"
- William Herbert Wallace – "The Raincoat"
- Robert Wood – "The Postcard"

Episodes yet to be matched with true case histories are:

- The Canvas Bag
- The Door Key
- The Faded Tartan Scarf
- The Piece of Iron Chain
- The Mandolin String
- Notes – Kilroy was Here
- The Open End Wrench
- The Length of Sash Cord
- The Shilling
- The Shopping Bag (partly based on John Christie)
- The Silencer

== Comparisons with source material ==
- Two episodes, "The Car Tyre" and "The Gas Receipt," were the same story with minor differences between the two. "The Baby's Jacket" and "The Spectacles," were also based on the same case, as were "The Tan Shoe" and "The Leather Bag."
- Four famous murder cases were dramatised on The Black Museum: John George Haigh, the "Acid Bath Murderer"; George Joseph Smith, the "Brides in the Bath Murderer"; Adelaide Bartlett, whose husband died from chloroform poisoning; and Florence Maybrick, who was convicted of using arsenic from fly-paper to murder her husband James Maybrick.
- In "The Open End Wrench" it's mistakenly stated that the culprit was executed in Dartmoor. No twentieth-century executions were carried out in Dartmoor. Built during the Napoleonic Wars to contain French and American POWs, it was, after lying idle from 1815 to 1850, later commissioned as a convict prison and used for dangerous long-term prisoners only.
- The dramatised story of "The Hammerhead" was changed to make the victim's sister the murderer instead of the boy friend.
- The episode "Small White Boxes" is the only story in which the real names were used rather than pseudonyms.

== See also ==
- Orson Welles radio credits
