= Percy Hoskins =

British journalist (1904–1989)

Percy Kellick Hoskins (28 December 1904 – 5 February 1989) was the chief crime reporter for the British newspaper the Daily Express in the 1950s. He also provided stories for radio and television crime shows, such as Whitehall 1212, and Secrets of Scotland Yard.

Hoskins earned a mixture of notoriety and admiration within his profession due to the stance he took regarding suspected serial killer Dr John Bodkin Adams. Hoskins was the only reporter with a national paper to support Adams when arrested in 1956, while the rest of the press unanimously assumed Adams's guilt. Hoskins's stance was seen by his peers as career suicide, but, in the end, Adams was acquitted. Lord Beaverbrook, the paper's proprietor, phoned Hoskins after the verdict and told him, "Two people were acquitted today", meaning that Hoskins would keep his job and his reputation. This quote later became the title of a book Hoskins wrote about the case. During the trial, Hoskins befriended Adams, and when Adams died in 1983, he bequeathed Hoskins £1,000. Hoskins gave the money to charity.

== Life ==
Hoskins was born in Bridport, Dorset, England. He joined the Evening Standard when he was 19 and then moved on to the Daily Express, where he worked for more than five decades in the crime department, eventually becoming its chief reporter. He was famed for the friendships he cultivated with policemen, who would often act as his sources. He "kept open house for senior police officers at his flat at 55 Park Lane". Hoskins was said to know where a great many skeletons were hidden in high places: "If you were in trouble with the police, you rang Percy before your lawyer".

He avoided having his own desk at the Express so that executives could not complain at the working hours he did or did not keep. Of Hoskins's approach to work, fellow journalist Michael Bywater recalled his advice: "Whenever you are interviewing somebody, always have this question in the back of your mind 'Why is this bugger lying to me?'"

He was seen by many as "amiable [and] rotund" and boasted a long friendship with his "lookalike" Alfred Hitchcock, with whom Hoskins once posed in Soho for a 'bookends picture'. He was also friends with J Edgar Hoover, director of the FBI.

He had a close friendship with the newspaper's proprietor, Lord Beaverbrook.

== John Bodkin Adams case ==
In 1956 the Metropolitan Police opened an investigation into the deaths of the patients of Dr John Bodkin Adams, an Eastbourne general practitioner. Hoskins was the only reporter with a major paper to doubt the guilt of Adams during the investigation and subsequent trial. The case attracted worldwide attention, and, at the height of the press hysteria, figures of 400 victims were being mentioned. Hoskins lonely stance on Adams's innocence was, he later wrote, caused by conversations he had had with Adams during the police investigation: he noted Adams's apparent lack of concern and 'naive' inability to realise how in danger his life was when faced with the death penalty, then still in effect. Others have also cited his dislike of the officer in charge of the case, Herbert Hannam, as contributing to Hoskins's opposition to the investigation.

Hoskins's stance led Lord Beaverbrook, the owner of his paper, to question Hoskins's (and therefore the newspaper's) take on the story, since every other paper was convinced of Adams's guilt. When Adams was acquitted of one count of murder at the Old Bailey in 1957 (another charge was withdrawn via a nolle prosequi), Lord Beaverbrook phoned Hoskins and told him, "Two people were acquitted today", meaning that Hoskins was to retain his job and his reputation.

After the trial, Adams was whisked away to a safe house by Hoskins and interviewed for two weeks. The resulting articles appeared exclusively in the Express. Hoskins and Adams remained friends for the rest of Adams's life, and each year, on the anniversary of the acquittal, Adams would phone Hoskins to thank him for another year of his life.

When Adams died in 1983, he left Hoskins £1000, which "somewhat embarrassed" Hoskins. Hoskins gave it to charity. In 1984, Hoskins published a book about the case: Two Men Were Acquitted: The trial and acquittal of Doctor John Bodkin Adams. He reiterated his belief that Adams was innocent but conceded that Adams had been naive in his behaviour and too avaricious in his chase of patients' bequests.

Scotland Yard's files on the case were opened in 2003 and show that police believed that 163 of Adams patients died in suspicious circumstances. Reporter Rodney Hallworth and historian Pamela Cullen also identify another patient, Annie Sharpe, as a possible victim who was not included in this number, and Cullen further identifies Edward Cavendish, 10th Duke of Devonshire as a probable victim.

== Books ==
- No Hiding Place ! the Full Authentic Story of Scotland Yard in Action, Daily Express, 1951
- The Sound of Murder, John Long, 1973
- Two Men Were Acquitted: The trial and acquittal of Doctor John Bodkin Adams, Secker & Warburg, 1984

=== Radio ===
- Hoskins contributed storylines and research to the radio series Whitehall 1212, about New Scotland Yard's Black Museum. It was written by Wyllis Cooper and ran for 44 episodes in the early 1950s.
- He also appeared in, and contributed to, the Harry Towers series Secrets of Scotland Yard with Clive Brook, which ran from 1949-1951.To add to the air of authenticity, Brook sometimes discussed matters relating to the dramatised cases with Hoskins.
- Hoskins also helped produce the crime prevention programme It's Your Money They're After for the BBC in conjunction with the Metropolitan Police though it was judged to have had little effect on crime figures.

=== Cinema and television writing ===
Hoskins provided the stories for the following programmes and films.

- The Blue Parrot (1953) (story "Gunman" (with John Le Mesurier))
- Dangerous Cargo (1954) (with John Le Mesurier)
- Burnt Evidence (1954)

=== Appearances ===
On 17 September 1957 Percy Hoskins appeared on Game 1 of the American TV Show, "To Tell the Truth" with panellists Polly Bergen, Ralph Bellamy, Kitty Carlisle, and Hy Gardner.
