= Tidy =

Tidy may refer to:

- PerlTidy, a computer program for nicely reformatting Perl source code
- Tidy (album), a 1996 album by Kinnie Starr
- Tidy (surname)
- TIDY, software for managing property services
- Tidying, an aspect of housekeeping
- Tidy Trax, a British hard house record label
