= Bryan Nicholson Brooke =

British surgeon (1915–1998)

Bryan Nicholas Brooke
- Born: 21 February 1915; Croydon
- Died: 18 September 1998 (aged 83); Kenley, Surrey
- Occupation: Surgeon
- Known for: Brooke ileostomy

Bryan Nicholas Brooke MD, M.Chir., FRCS (21 February 1915 – 18 September 1998) was a British surgeon and pioneer of surgery for ulcerative colitis.

== Biography ==
The son of numismatist George C. Brooke, after education at Bradfield College, he matriculated at Corpus Christi College, Cambridge, where he graduated BA in 1936. After clinical training at St Bartholomew's Hospital, he qualified MRCS in 1939 and graduated MB BChir in 1940 and MChir in 1944 from the University of Cambridge. He was elected FRCS in 1942 and was chief surgical assistant at St Bartholomew's Hospital. In 1944 he joined the RAMC and served as a lieutenant colonel in charge of a surgical division.

After demobilisation, Brooke spent a year as a senior lecturer in Aberdeen. He joined in 1947 the new professorial surgical unit headed by Alan Stammers at Queen Elizabeth Hospital Birmingham. There, Lionel Hardy, (William) Trevor Cooke, and Clifford Hawkins were keenly interested in testing the newly introduced adherent Koening-Rutzen bag for potential ileostomy patients.

The Birmingham group and a few like minded colleagues were able to show that an ileostomy using the adherent device, combined with staged colectomy and subsequently proctocolectomy, produced outstandingly successful results. Brooke also devised a simple eversion ileostomy, later adopted world wide. His awareness of the problems encountered by his patients led him to found the Ileostomy Association in 1956 and he was the first president.

He received the higher MD from the University of Birmingham in 1954. He was appointed in 1963 the first professor of surgery at St George's Hospital and held that post until 1976.

... his international reputation flourished and he was in steady demand to participate in international meetings and as a visiting professor, especially in America and Australia, where he was elected an honorary fellow of the Royal Australasian College of Surgeons in 1977. ... He published several textbooks and numerous articles: his style and use of language were elegant and apposite.

Outside medicine Brooke was a skilled potter, an able painter, and a craftsman carpenter. He designed the altar rails for the local church where his funeral was held. He leaves a wife, Naomi; three daughters; and his companion, Diana, who nursed him throughout his final illness.

== Selected publications ==
=== Articles ===
- Inglis JM; Brooke BN (11 August 1956). "Trendelenburg Tilt". Br Med J. 2 (4988): 343–344. doi:10.1136/bmj.2.4988.343. PMC 2035088. PMID 13342485. (See Trendelenburg position.)
- Brooke BN (1961). "Malignant change in ulcerative colitis". Diseases of the Colon & Rectum. 4 (6): 393–398. doi:10.1007/BF02616569. PMID 13873443. S2CID 2721432.
- Eade MN; Cooke WT; Brooke BN; Thompson, H. (1971). "Liver disease in Crohn's colitis: a study of 21 consecutive patients having colectomy". Annals of Internal Medicine. 74 (4): 518–528. doi:10.7326/0003-4819-74-4-518. PMID 5551160.
- Brooke BN (29 January 1972). "Crohn's disease of the large bowel". Br Med J. 1 (5795): 310–311. doi:10.1136/bmj.1.5795.310-c. PMC 1787168.
- Cave DR; Mitchell DN; Brooke BN (September 1975). "Experimental animal studies of the etiology and pathogenesis of Crohn's disease". Gastroenterology. 69 (3): 618–624. doi:10.1016/s0016-5085(19)32453-9. PMID 1158079.
- Brooke BN (3 November 1979). "Chance acquaintances". Br Med J. 2 (6198): 1130–1131. doi:10.1136/bmj.2.6198.1130. PMC 1596986. PMID 20792969.

=== Books ===
- You and your operation. Faber & Faber. 1956.
- with Geoffrey Slaney: Metabolic derangements in gastrointestinal. Springfield, Illinois: Charles C. Thomas. 1966; 169+xii, illustrated
- Understanding Cancer. Holt McDougal. 1973.
- as editor with Andrew W. Wilkinson: Inflammatory disease of the bowel – Conference proceedings. Tunbridge Wells: Pitman Medical. 1980. ISBN 978-0272795569.
- The troubled gut: causes and consequences of diarrhoea. King Edward's Hospital Fund for London. 1986. ISBN 978-0-19-724635-1; pbk, illustrated; 172 pp.
