= John W. Todd =

English physician and author

Dr. John W. Todd MD, FRCP
- Born: 16 May 1912; Middleton, Greater Manchester
- Died: 4 April 1989 (aged 76); Farnham, Surrey
- Education: Manchester Grammar School, Middlesex Hospital
- Occupation: consultant physician
- Years active: 1939-1977
- Known for: medical books and papers
- Medical career
- Profession: physician
- Institutions: Farnham Hospital, Frimley Park Hospital

John Walford Todd (16 May 1912 in Middleton, Greater Manchester – 4 April 1989 in Farnham, Surrey) was an English physician and medical author.

== Early years ==
John Todd, known to his family as "Jack", was born in Middleton, 16 May 1912, youngest child (jointly with his twin sister, Joan) of James Jackson Todd and his wife Winifred Mary Todd née Winter. When he was a small boy the family moved to Hazel Grove, Stockport. He was educated at Manchester Grammar School and then gained a scholarship to study at the Middlesex Hospital Medical School where he graduated MBBS in 1935. He obtained his MRCP in 1938 and MD in 1939.

== Wartime and after ==
From 1939 to 1942 he was Resident Medical Officer at the Middlesex Hospital. This was during the Blitz, from which however he escaped unscathed. In 1942 he joined the RAMC and served in India and Burma until the end of the war, after which he was in Sumatra. He rose to the rank of lieutenant colonel, as Officer in Charge of the Medical Division. In 1947, having left the army, he was appointed as consultant physician at Farnham Hospital. In 1974 he added to this a similar appointment at Frimley Park Hospital. He retained these posts until retirement in 1977.

== Books and articles ==
He had begun to write material intended for publication while still in the army, leading to:

- Rational Medicine. Bristol: John Wright & Sons Ltd. 1949.

described by reviewer L. J. Witts as "The pastoral side of medicine". Further books and numerous articles followed, including:

- (as editor) Textbook of Clinical Medicine. London: Pitman Medical Publishing Co. 1960.

with contributions from William E. Clarke, John Forbes, Christopher Hardwick, C. F. Hawkins, Michael Kremer, A. A. G Lewis, Charles A. St. Hill, Frank H. Scadding, C. C. Thomas and John W. Todd

- Health and Humanity: an Introduction to Medicine. Oxford: Pergamon. 1966. LCCN 66022728.
- The State of Medicine: a Critical Review. Lancaster: MTP Press. 1981. ISBN 0-85200-384-6. LCCN 81215889.
- "Medicine and Surgery, Practice of". Encyclopædia Britannica (15th ed.).

=== Some major papers ===
- "Money and Medicine". The Lancet. 3 June 1967.
- "The Cost and Complexity of Medicine". The Lancet. 12 October 1968.
- Todd, John W. (28 March 1970). "The Errors of Medicine". The Lancet. 295 (7648): 665–670. doi:10.1016/S0140-6736(70)90898-6. PMID 4190643.

summarised as "The main errors of medicine are: devising remedies from theory and assuming they must be effective; developing facile aetiological theories, leading in turn to remedies based on theory; failing to look at the patient as a whole (when dealing with chronic complainers); and over-valuing technology." These were key notions that he returned to again and again in his life.

== Other professional activities ==
In 1969 he was elected as a Fellow of the Royal College of Physicians, FRCP. He was an active member of the BMA and served on occasion as secretary and chairman of the Aldershot and Farnham Division. He often expressed his full support for the NHS and disagreed with the BMA position on such matters as terms of service. Nevertheless in 1988 he was elected as a Fellow of the BMA for his work with them.

== In the Farnham community ==
Todd was active in numerous local groups, for a time as a town councillor. He was at various times chairman of the Bourne Residents Association, chairman of the Farnham Society, vice chairman of the League of Friends of Farnham Hospital, founder chairman of the Farnham branch of the Arthritis and Rheumatism Council, chairman of the Farnham and district group of The Ramblers' Association, and chairman of the West Surrey Centre of the National Trust.

== Personal life ==
He married Dorothy Joyce Young, a former nurse, in 1947. They had four children, two of whom became doctors. He died at his home in Farnham 4 April 1989.
