= Tidy (surname) =

Tidy as a surname derives from the Middle English word tidef, which designated a type of small bird.

People with the name include:

- Bill Tidy (1933–2023), English cartoonist
- Charles Meymott Tidy (1843–1892), English medical man and sanitary chemist
- Frank Tidy (1932–2017), British cinematographer
- George Tidy (1930–2023), Scottish footballer
- Henry Letheby Tidy (1877–1960), English physician
- Thomas Holmes Tidy (c. 1808–1874), British army officer
- Thomas Tidy (1846–1892), English cricketer
- Warwick Tidy (born 1953), English cricketer
