= Charing Cross Trunk Murder =

1927 murder in London

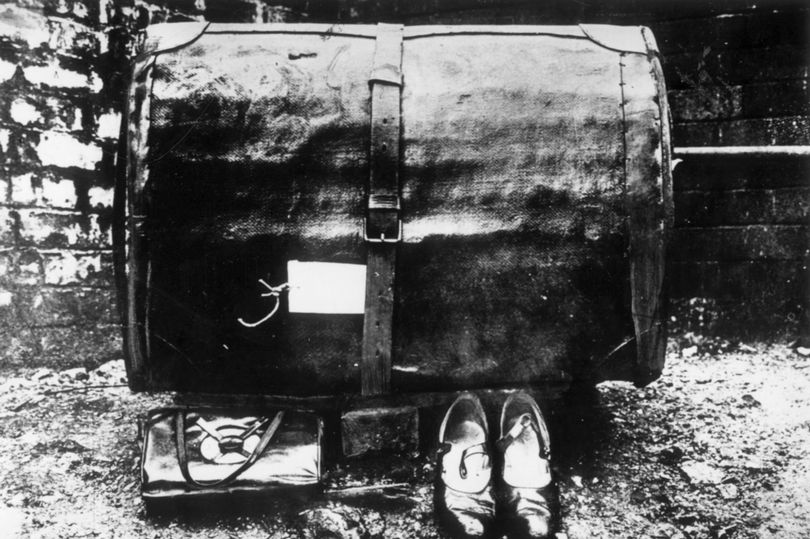
The "Charing Cross Trunk" with Bonati's shoes and bag

The Charing Cross Trunk Murder took place in a third floor office at 86 Rochester Row in the City of Westminster in London on 4 May 1927.

== Events ==
On 6 May 1927, John Robinson, a 35-year-old estate agent, took a cab to Charing Cross railway station, where he deposited a large black trunk in the left-luggage office. On 10 May after a "dreadful smell" was noted, the police opened the trunk to find the dismembered body of a woman, with each limb separately wrapped in brown paper.

The shopowner who sold the trunk and the cab driver were traced, and the police that visited the office at No 86 said it was "hastily vacated but scrupulously clean". Although the identity parade failed to pick out Robinson, a more careful search of the property found a matchstick in the bin with a small spot of blood.

A laundry tag on the dead woman's knickers for "P Holt" was traced to a Mrs Holt in Chelsea, who had employed ten women as servants over the past two years, and all were traced except for a "Mrs Rolls". Holt confirmed that the head of the dead woman was that of Mrs Rolls, who turned out to be Minnie Alice Bonati, who had left her Italian waiter husband to live with a Mr. Rolls, and now used his name.

Bonati was working as a domestic servant and supplementing her income with prostitution. She had met Robinson at Victoria station, and they had gone to his office for sex. She died after an argument about money, with Robinson claiming that she attacked him, leading him to push her away, causing Bonati to fall, hit her head and die. He claimed that he panicked, bought a knife and trunk and disposed of the body, because he thought that no one would believe him. Robinson's story was contradicted by forensic pathologist Bernard Spilsbury, who said that Bonati had died of asphyxiation after being knocked unconscious, which could not have been caused by a fall as Robinson claimed.

During his investigation Detective Inspector Grosse of the Metropolitan Police also pursued enquiries on behalf of a newspaper, an action which some held to be "reckless and unscrupulous" and argued should lead to the withdrawal of his pension. After being produced as a trial exhibit, the trunk was retained in the collections of its private "Black Museum" (now the Crime Museum), where it was the subject of Episode 47 of the 1952 radio crime drama The Black Museum, with Orson Welles as both the host and narrator of the show. A version of the story (with names and dates changed) was dramatised in Dec 1951 as 'The Founier Case' episode of Whitehall 1212 (radio show). A third dramatisation was broadcast as 'The Family Solicitor' in the 1949–51 series The Secrets of Scotland Yard with Clive Brook as the narrator

The trunk was also loaned from the Crime Museum to the Crime Museum Uncovered exhibition at the Museum of London from October 2015 to April 2016.

Robinson was tried at the Old Bailey and convicted by Spilsbury's evidence that Bonati had been deliberately asphyxiated. He was sentenced to death by Mr. Justice Swift and hanged at Pentonville Prison on 12 August 1927.
