= Cleft chin murder =

1944 murder in Staines, England

The cleft chin murder was a killing which occurred as part of a string of crimes during 1944, and was mentioned in George Orwell's essay "Decline of the English Murder". It became known as the "cleft chin murder" because the murder victim, George Edward Heath, a taxi driver, had a cleft chin.

The culprits were Karl Hultén, a Swedish-born deserter from the U.S. Army, and Elizabeth Jones, an eighteen-year-old waitress.

Jones later said she dreamed of "doing something exciting," and fantasized about being a stripper. At the time, Hultén described himself as an officer and as a Chicago gangster, both of which were false.

== History ==
Jones was born in Neath, Wales, in 1926. At the age of thirteen she ran away from home and eventually she was sent to an approved school because she was considered to be "beyond parental control." Hultén was born in Sweden in 1922 and had enlisted in the U.S. Army after the Attack on Pearl Harbor, previously having been a grocery clerk and a mechanic.

On 3 October 1944, Jones (married but separated from her husband) met Hultén (married with a child) in a tea shop. Already AWOL, he claimed to be an officer and a gangster. The relationship lasted only six days, during which time they knocked over a nurse cycling along a country lane and robbed her, before picking up a hitchhiker, knocking her unconscious, robbing her, and then throwing her into a river to drown (though she survived).

Finally they murdered George Edward Heath at Knowle Green near Staines in Middlesex. 34 years old, Heath had been medically discharged from the British Army after being wounded in the evacuation of Dunkirk and at the time of his death was working as an unlicensed taxi driver. Jones and Hultén robbed him of £8, which they spent at the dog races the next day, whilst the body was found in a ditch on Saturday 7 October and reported to the Metropolitan Police (Staines then fell within the Metropolitan Police District).

Initially Hultén had stolen an army truck, which he eventually abandoned, but he kept the murdered taxi driver's car. After spending the taxi driver's £8, Jones announced she wanted a fur coat. Hultén attacked a woman in the street and tried to snatch her coat, but the police came and Hultén only just managed to escape in the stolen car. He was eventually caught because the car was still in his possession; to the American CID he tried to pass himself off with his alias as Lt. Ricky Allen 501st Parachute Infantry Regiment; his real identity was established. In the meantime Jones had gone to her local police station in Hammersmith and admitted to the crimes, to ease her conscience, before being taken to Staines to be charged with the murder.

The Americans waived the Visiting Forces Act allowing him to be tried in a British court, given that Jones fell outside their jurisdiction. During the trial they implicated each other, with Jones alleging that she feared violence from Hultén if she did not follow his instructions. They were both found guilty of murdering Heath. Mr Justice Charles sentenced them to be hanged, but while Hultén was executed at Pentonville Prison on 8 March 1945, Jones was reprieved after a recommendation of mercy from the jury. She was released from prison in May 1954 but her subsequent fate is unknown, although series 1 episode 6 of the television series Murder Maps reports her death as occurring in 1980. An account of the trial was published in 1945.

Jones's reprieve caused some controversy, because many people considered the crimes to be cowardly, and in a war-torn Britain where everyone was pulling together to face a common enemy, almost treasonous. "SHE SHOULD HANG" was graffitied in several places in Jones's home town. A number of references to the murder appear in the contemporary diary of Basil Cottle (1917–1994), a Bletchley Park cryptanalyst. They range from the outrage of his landlady, "Mrs Read, quite desolee, about the Jones reprieve", to the aside by a Foreign Office civilian at Bletchley, Audrey Clare Stobart, "Clare is getting very witty - her remark about men wanting to marry Jones because it'll be safer than taking up taxi-driving."

== Cultural references ==
Three guns from the crime spree are in the Crime Museum at New Scotland Yard and so it was documented in "The Jack Handle", an episode of the 1950s radio crime anthology The Black Museum narrated by Orson Welles. It also featured in a 1952 episode of Whitehall 1212 (radio show) called 'The Murder of Charles Brooks'.

A film, Chicago Joe and the Showgirl was made in 1990, based on the story, directed by Bernard Rose, written by David Yallop, and starring Emily Lloyd as Elizabeth Jones, Kiefer Sutherland as Karl, and Patsy Kensit.
