= Charles Black (counterfeiter) =

Charles Black (1928–2012) produced counterfeit British and U.S. currency together with traveller's cheques for a number of years before being arrested. As a testament to his skills, his techniques rendered the U.S. Department of the Treasury's detection equipment obsolete. He was born in Lewisham, London.

It was while he was in prison, serving a sentence for car-ringing, that he was introduced to the art of forgery. Black's mastery of the subject could only be exclaimed at by those responsible for his arrest and conviction.

He was locked inside for a jail term for the forgeries.

Upon Black's release in 1982, he was divorced by his first wife and subsequently travelled to Malaysia in pursuit of a suitable location to set up another forgers' den with one of his former fellow inmates. Initially a continuation of the aforementioned plot, Black's first trip to Thailand in 1983 inspired him to forgo the forgery and begin an international marriage agency. In 1985, He married a Thai national and established Siam Introductions, which was the first agency of its kind and featured in over 13 talk shows in the United Kingdom, including Trisha and The Vanessa Show discussing the subject of Mail Order Brides.

His biography, Counterfeiter: The Story of a Master Forger (ISBN 0-312-03805-4) was published in 1989, whilst the collections of the Crime Museum at New Scotland Yard includes a set of his printing plates, a series of his forged bank-notes and a hollowed out kitchen door he once used to conceal some of them.
