= The Blue Parrot =

1953 British film by John Harlow

- Directed by: John Harlow
- Written by: Allan MacKinnon, story by Percy Hoskins
- Produced by: Stanley Haynes
- Starring: Dermot Walsh; Jacqueline Hill
- Cinematography: Robert Navarro
- Edited by: Robert Jordan Hill
- Music by: Eric Jupp
- Production company: Act Films Ltd
- Distributed by: Monarch Film Corporation (UK)
- Release date: October 1953 (UK)
- Running time: 69 minutes
- Country: United Kingdom
- Language: English

The Blue Parrot is a low budget 1953 British second feature ('B') crime film directed by John Harlow and starring Dermot Walsh, Jacqueline Hill, Ballard Berkeley, Richard Pearson, and John Le Mesurier. The film was produced by Stanley Haynes for Act Films Ltd. The screenplay was by Alan MacKinnon from a story by British crime reporter Percy Hoskins.

== Plot ==
Small-time crook Rocks Owen receives a mysterious phone call at the Blue Parrot Soho night club and is later found murdered. Bob Herrick, a New York detective in London to learn about Scotland Yard's methods, investigates, and policewoman Maureen Maguire goes undercover at the club posing as a hostess.

== Cast ==
- Dermot Walsh as Bob Herrick
- Jacqueline Hill as Maureen Maguire
- Ballard Berkeley as Supt Chester
- Richard Pearson as Quinney
- June Ashley as Gloria
- Ferdy Mayne as Stevens
- John Le Mesurier as Henry Carson
- Valerie White as Eva West
- Victor Lucas as Rocks Owen
- Edwin Richfield as Taps Campelli
- Diane Watts as Carla
- Arthur Rigby as Charlie
- Thomas Gallagher as commissionaire (uncredited)
- Joe Wadham as PC Jenkins (uncredited)

== Critical reception ==
In a contemporary review Kine Weekly wrote: "Pleasantly intriguing, if modest, whodunnit. It illustrates the big part played by a young American detective in the apprehension of a Soho killer, and ends with a bang. The red herrings are neatly handled by the competent cast. The comedy relief is apt and the dénouement suspenseful. Feminine appeal slight yet piquant."

The Radio Times said: "Dermot Walsh does his best with lacklustre material, and John Le Mesurier turns up in a supporting slot, but there's little else to recommend it."

In British Sound Films: The Studio Years 1928–1959 David Quinlan wrote: ''Efficient thriller with a bit more sting in the action than usual.''

Chibnall and McFarlane in The British 'B' Film write: "There is little to distinguish this from numerous other urban-set thrillers, but its pacey editing (Robert Hill) and cast of reliable character players carries one over the less probable plot maneuvers."
