= Dangerous Cargo =

1954 British film by John Harlow

- Directed by: John Harlow
- Written by: Percy Hoskins; Stanley Haynes
- Produced by: Stanley Haynes
- Starring: Jack Watling; Susan Stephen; Karel Stepanek
- Cinematography: Lionel Banes
- Edited by: Adam Dawson
- Production company: ACT Films
- Distributed by: Monarch Film Corporation
- Release date: 21 June 1954
- Running time: 61 minutes
- Country: United Kingdom
- Language: English

Dangerous Cargo is a 1954 British black and white second feature ('B') crime film directed by John Harlow starring Jack Watling, Susan Stephen and Karel Stepanek. The film was written by Daily Express crime reporter Percy Hoskins and Stanley Haynes, and produced by Haynes for ACT Films.

== Plot ==
Security man Tim Matthews works at London Airport. His wartime friend Harry, now a criminal working for master crook Pliny, tricks him into owing money to a bookie by giving him tips on dog races controlled by the gang, where he consistently wins, then one final, false tip, which leaves Tim owing much more money than he can repay. The criminals demand to know details of gold shipments coming through the airport and when he refuses, they beat him up and threaten his wife Janie, and he gives them the details. The couple enlist the aid of their friend Noel, and inform the police, who let the robbery plan unfold, with undercover officers taking the place of all the staff but Tim and Noel. When the gang get to the airport to steal the gold, the police are waiting.

== Cast ==
- Jack Watling as Tim Matthews
- Susan Stephen as Janie Matthews
- Karel Stepanek as Pliny
- Richard Pearson as Noel
- Terence Alexander as Harry
- John Le Mesurier as Luigi
- Ballard Berkeley as Findley
- Genine Graham as Diana
- John Longden as Worthington
- Trevor Reid as Watson
- Arthur Rigby as Feathers
- John H. Watson as Tomkins
- Arthur Mullard as thug

== Production ==
The film was shot at Walton Studios near London with sets designed by the art director Don Russell.

== Critical reception ==
Monthly Film Bulletin wrote: "A rather pedestrian "crook " story of a familiar type. Susan Stephen, as Janie Matthews, engagingly makes the most of a flimsy part."

Kine Weekly wrote: "Compact, skilfully carpentered romantic crime melodrama. ... Warm domestic byplay neatly balances the rough stuff and, together with authentic detail, contributes to a happy, thrill-packed climax. Women, as well as men, should find the lively capsule easy to swallow and digest ... Jack Watling thoroughly convinces as the true-blue, though completely ingenuous Tim, Susan Stephen makes an engaging Jane, and Karel Stcpanck is in his clement as the evil Pliny. Supporting players, too, are natural, Colourful dog racing and nightclub sequences effectively punctuate tender fireside scenes, and contrast subtly underlines the moral of the salutary closely knit tale."

Picturegoer wrote: "Crime and domesticity seldom make good partners, but in this lively little melodrama the marriage definitely proves fruitful. ... Jack Watling and Susan Staplen work smoothly and, together with a sound supporting cast, bring pathos and point to the play."

In British Sound Films: The Studio Years 1928–1959 David Quinlan rated the film as "average", writing: "Bright performances lift ordinary melodrama."
