= Stanley Haynes (producer) =

British film producer (1906–1958)

- Born: 14 November 1906; Birmingham, Warwickshire, United Kingdom
- Died: 1958 (aged 51–52); London, England, United Kingdom
- Occupations: Producer, Writer, Director
- Years active: 1934–1957 (film & TV)

Stanley Haynes (1906–1958) was a British film producer and screenwriter. He also directed one film, the 1946 period drama Carnival. He collaborated with David Lean at Cineguild Productions in the late 1940s. He was married to the actress Rosalyn Boulter.

== Selected filmography ==
- The Man Behind the Mask (1936)
- Everything Is Rhythm (1936)
- One Good Turn (1936)
- Action for Slander (1937)
- Storm in a Teacup (1937)
- South Riding (1938)
- One of Our Aircraft Is Missing (1942)
- The Way Ahead (1944)
- Carnival (1946)
- Oliver Twist (1948)
- The Passionate Friends (1949)
- Madeleine (1950)
- Scrooge (1951)
- The Blue Parrot (1953)
- Dangerous Cargo (1954)

== Bibliography ==
- Phillips, Gene. Beyond the Epic: The Life and Films of David Lean. University Press of Kentucky, 2006.
