= Ballard Berkeley =

English actor (1904–1988)

- Berkeley as Major Gowen in Fawlty Towers
- Born: Ballard Blascheck; 6 August 1904; Royal Tunbridge Wells, Kent, England
- Died: 16 January 1988 (aged 83); Westminster, London, England
- Occupation: Actor
- Years active: 1930–1988
- Spouse: Dorothy Long (m. 1929)

Ballard Blascheck (6 August 1904 – 16 January 1988), known professionally as Ballard Berkeley, (Note: Berkeley is pronounced "bark-lee".) was an English actor of stage and screen. He is best remembered for playing Major Gowen in the British television sitcom Fawlty Towers (1975 and 1979).

== Life and career ==
The son of Joseph and Beatrice Blascheck, he was born in Royal Tunbridge Wells, Kent. He married Dorothy Long in Liverpool in January 1929. During the 1930s, he performed regularly in the so-called "quota quickies". One of his earliest roles was as the heroic lead in the 1937 film The Last Adventurers.

He served as a special constable with the Metropolitan Police during the Second World War, witnessing the Blitz at first hand, including the bombing of the Café de Paris nightclub. For his service, he received the Defence Medal and the Special Constabulary Long Service Medal.

He appeared in the film In Which We Serve (1942) and in the Hitchcock film Stage Fright (1950). He featured as Detective Inspector Berkeley in two episodes of Edgar Lustgarten's drama series, Scotland Yard: "Person Unknown" (1956), and "Bullet from the Past" (1957).

Berkeley is best known for the role of bumbling Major Gowen (retired) in the BBC TV comedy Fawlty Towers, and a similar role in the legal drama The Main Chance (1969). He portrayed another retired military man (Colonel Freddie Danby) in BBC Radio 4's The Archers, taking over the role from Norman Shelley.

He played a starring role in Fresh Fields as main character Hester's father Guy, was Hartley in To the Manor Born and played Colonel Culpepper in Terry and June. He had small roles in an episode of Citizen Smith (1977), an adaptation of Little Lord Fauntleroy (1980), and appeared once in Bless This House as a Royal Air Force Group Captain in the episode "Strangers in the Night" (1972), and in The New Avengers as Colonel Foster in the episode "Dirtier by the Dozen". He also had small roles in the BBC sitcoms Hi-de-Hi! ("Empty Saddles," 1983) and Are You Being Served? ("Memories Are Made of This," 1983).

He made a brief appearance in the 1985 film National Lampoon's European Vacation which starred American actor Chevy Chase. In this film, Berkeley played a British man who is involved in a minor road accident with the Griswalds.

Berkeley later performed the role of Winston—a similar character to "The Major"—in the radio comedy Wrinkles by Doug Naylor and Rob Grant. He played Badedas the Blue, a wizard in the radio comedy series Hordes of the Things. His last on-screen role was as the Head of the Army in the animated film version of Roald Dahl's The BFG.

Berkeley died in London on 16 January 1988, aged 83. He had been playing the part of Colonel Brace-Cartwright, owner of Felchester Rovers FC, in the Radio 4 sitcom Lenin of the Rovers starring Alexei Sayle, but he died after recording the first two episodes of the series and was replaced by Donald Hewlett.

Berkeley rose to prominence posthumously in the 2020s as an icon of Hampshire County Cricket Club, thanks to a scene in Fawlty Towers in which he joyfully announces, 'Hampshire won!' which the club would tweet to celebrate every victory.

== Selected filmography ==
=== Film ===
Year	Title	Role	Notes
1930	The Chinese Bungalow	Richard Marquess	
1930	London Melody	Jan Moor	
1933	Trouble		Uncredited
1934	White Ensign	Cortez	
1936	East Meets West	Nazim	
1937	The Last Adventurers	Fred Devlin	
1937	Jennifer Hale	Richard Severn	
1939	The Outsider		Uncredited
1939	Dead Men are Dangerous	Franklin's publisher's partner	Uncredited
1939	The Gang's All Here	Detective in Nightclub	Uncredited
1939	Black Eyes	Diner	
1939	The Saint in London	Sir Richard Blake	
1940	The Flying Squad	Smuggler in Aeroplane	Uncredited
1942	In Which We Serve	Engineer Commander	
1946	Quiet Weekend	Jim Brent	
1947	They Made Me a Fugitive	Rockliffe	
1949	Third Time Lucky	Bertram	
1950	Stage Fright	Sergeant Mellish	
1951	Blackmailed	Dr. McCormick	
1951	The Long Dark Hall	Police Supt. Maxey	
1951	Mr Drake's Duck	Maj. Deans	
1952	The Frightened Man	Inspector Bligh	
1952	The Lost Hours	Doctor	
1952	The Night Won't Talk	Inspector West	
1952	Circumstantial Evidence	Det. Insp. Hall	
1953	Three Steps to the Gallows	Insp. Haley	
1953	The Blue Parrot	Supt. Chester	
1953	Operation Diplomat	Inspector Austin	
1954	The Weak and the Wicked	Police Detective	Uncredited
1954	Dangerous Cargo	Security Officer Findley	
1954	Forbidden Cargo	Cooper	Uncredited
1954	Delayed Action	Insp. Crane	
1954	Child's Play	Dr. Nightingale	
1954	The Men of Sherwood Forest	Walter	
1955	See How They Run	Col. Warrington	
1955	The Stolen Airliner	Mr. Head	
1955	Passport to Treason	Inspector Thredgold	
1956	My Teenage Daughter	Magistrate	
1957	The Betrayal	Lawson	
1957	Yangtse Incident: The Story of H.M.S. Amethyst	Lt. Col. Dewar-Durie	
1957	After the Ball	Andrews	
1957	Just My Luck	Starter at Goodwood	Uncredited
1957	Night of the Demon	1st Reporter	Uncredited
1958	The Man Who Wouldn't Talk	Court Clerk	Uncredited
1958	Chain of Events		
1958	Further Up the Creek	Whacker Payne	
1960	Life Is a Circus		
1960	Cone of Silence	Commissioner	
1963	Impact	Bill MacKenzie	
1963	A Matter of Choice	Charles Grant	
1965	The Murder Game	Sir Colin Chalmers	
1965	Night Caller from Outer Space	Cmdr. Savage	
1968	Hostile Witness	Clerk of Court	
1970	The Weekend Murders	Peter, the butler	
1972	Bless This House	RAF officer on train	
1976	Confessions of a Driving Instructor	Lord Snodley	
1978	The Playbirds	Trainer	
1979	Confessions from the David Galaxy Affair	Judge	
1979	Queen of the Blues	Uncle Fred	
1980	The Wildcats of St Trinian's	Humphry Wills	
1980	Little Lord Fauntleroy	Sir Harry	
1983	Bullshot	Hotel Guest	
1985	National Lampoon's European Vacation	Second English Motorist	
1989	The BFG	Head of the Army	Voice; posthumous release

=== Television ===
Year	Title	Role	Notes
1958	Leave It to Todhunter	Det. Chief Insp. Moresby	
1959	The Invisible Man	Manton	episode: " Play to Kill"
1961	Deadline Midnight	Desmond	7 episodes
1963	Maigret	Dr Pardon	episode: " A Man Condemned"
1964	Swizzlewick	Major Lamb	
1966	United!	Dr Newkes	
1967–1968	The Newcomers	Colonel Renshaw	
1968	Sherlock Homes	Sir Charles Baskerville	episode: " The Hound of the Baskervilles (Part 1)"
1971	Coronation Street	Colonel Cantrill	episode: 1055
1972	The Shadow of the Tower	Sir Thomas Tyrrel	episode: " A Fly in the Ointment"
1972–1980	The Dick Emery Show	Various characters	6 episodes
1975–1979	Fawlty Towers	Major Gowen	12 episodes
1977	Mr. Big	Hotel Manager	episode: "Going Straight"
1981	To the Manor Born	Greville Hartley	episode: "Connections in High Places"
1982–1987	Terry and June	Sir Arthur Forster-Carter / Colonel Culpepper	episodes: "Swingtime" / "They Also Serve"
1983	Are You Being Served?	Angler	episode: "Memories Are Made of This"
1984–1986	Fresh Fields	Guy Penrose	10 episodes
