= Florence Maybrick =

Wrongfully convicted of murder in Britain (1862–1941)

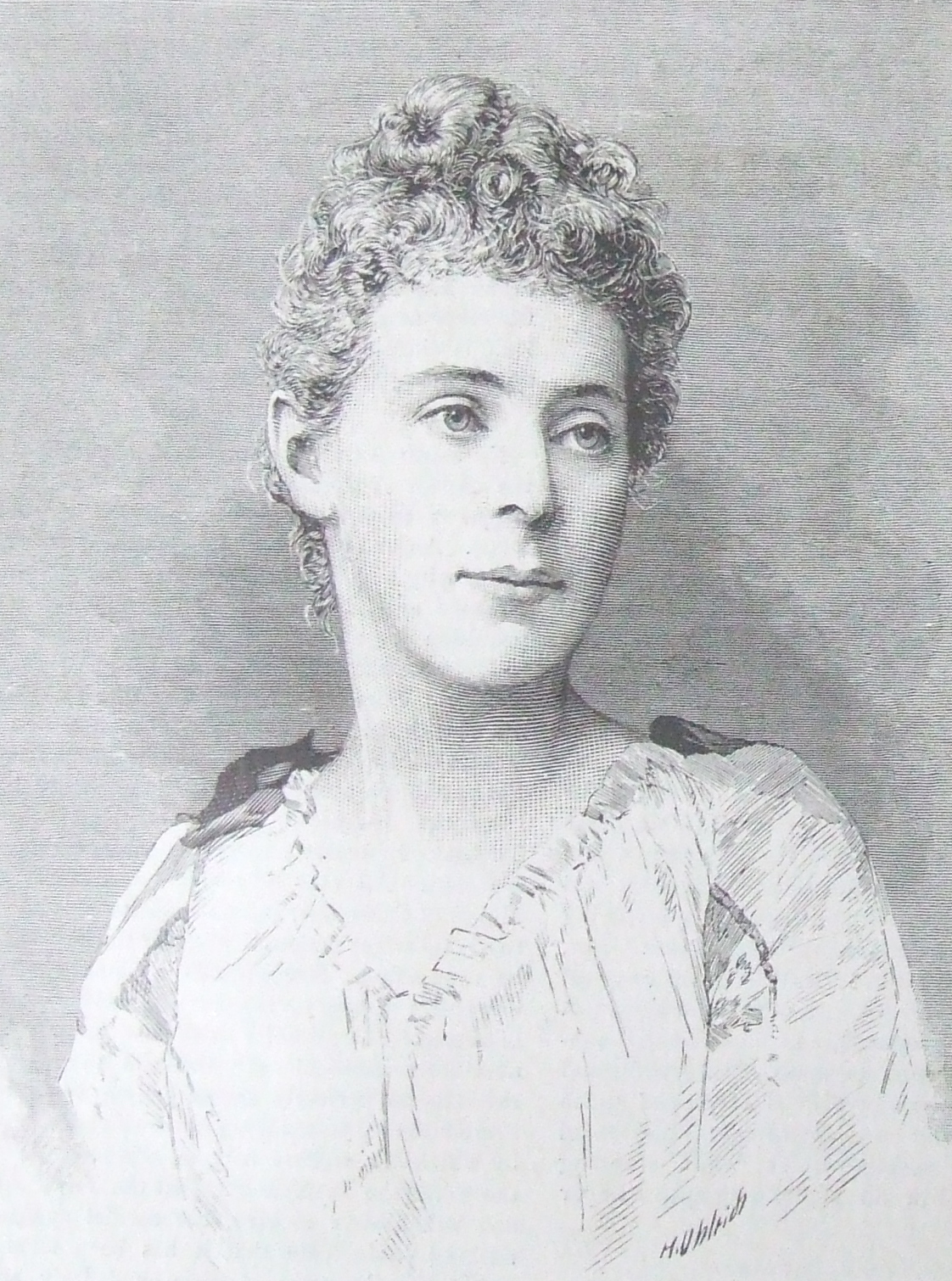
- Born: Florence Elizabeth Chandler; September 3, 1862; Mobile, Alabama, U.S.
- Died: October 23, 1941 (aged 79); Gaylordsville, Connecticut, U.S.
- Spouse: James Maybrick (m. 1881; died 1889)
- Children: 2
- Status: Deceased
- Conviction: Murder
- Penalty: Death; commuted to life imprisonment

Details
- Victims: James Maybrick

Florence Elizabeth Chandler Maybrick (3 September 1862 – 23 October 1941) was an American woman convicted in the United Kingdom of murdering her husband, cotton merchant James Maybrick.

== Early life ==
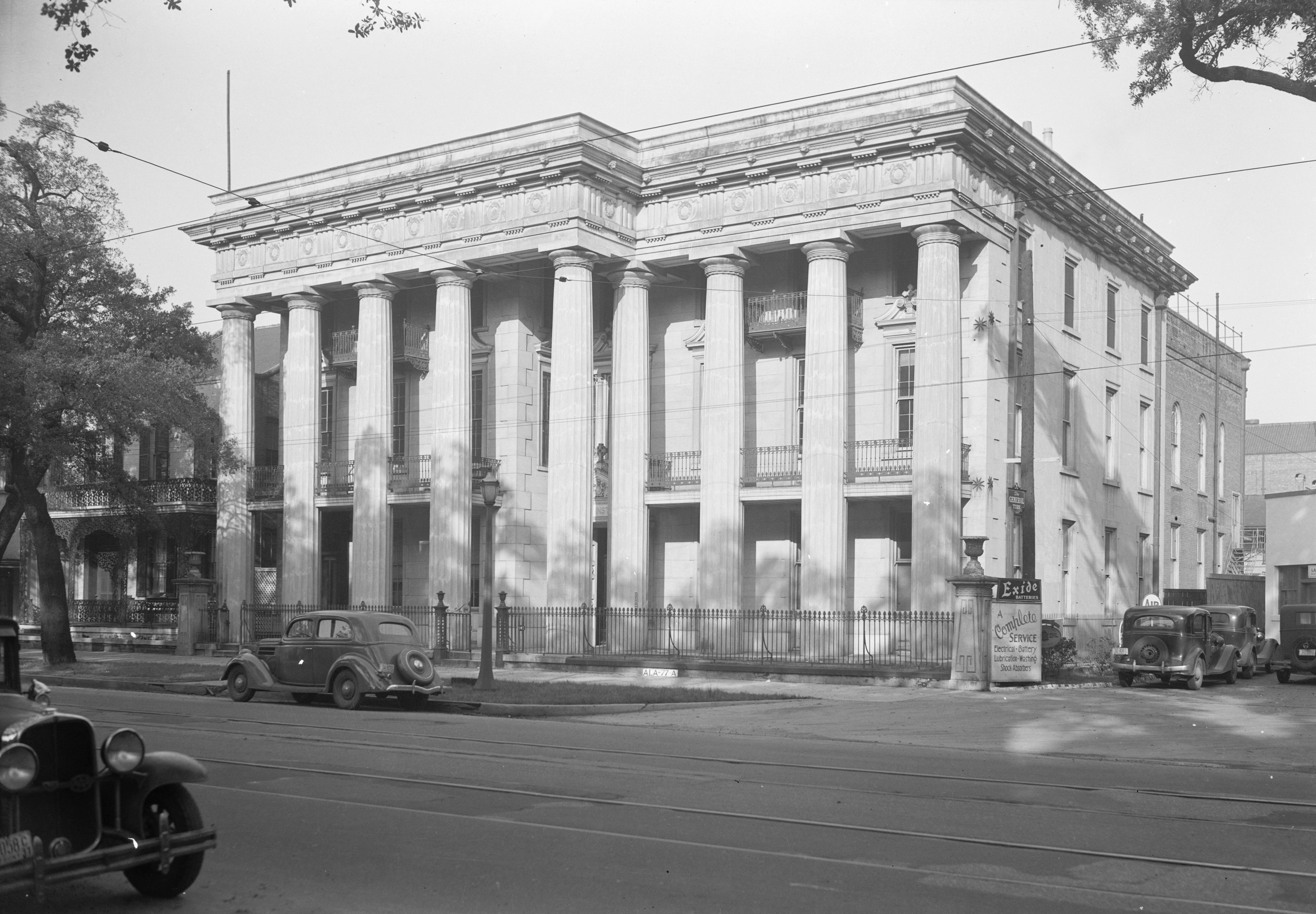
The Chandler Mansion in Mobile, Alabama, birthplace of Florence Chandler.

Florence Maybrick was born Florence Elizabeth Chandler in Mobile, Alabama. She was the daughter of William George Chandler, a one-time mayor of Mobile and a partner in the banking firm of St. John Powers and Company, and Caroline Chandler Du Barry, née Holbrook. Florence's father had died before her birth. Her mother married in 1872 her third husband Baron Adolph von Roques, a cavalry officer in the Eighth Cuirassier Regiment of the German Army.

== Marriage ==
While travelling by ship to the United Kingdom, Florence met James Maybrick, a cotton merchant from Liverpool. Other passengers were shocked by a 17-year-old girl spending so much time alone in the company of Maybrick, who was 23 years her senior. A year later, on 27 July 1881, the couple were married at St James's Church, Piccadilly, in London. They settled in Battlecrease House, Aigburth, a suburb of Liverpool.

Florence made quite an impression on the social scene in Liverpool, and the Maybricks were usually to be found at the most important balls and functions, the very picture of a happy, successful couple. But Maybrick, a hypochondriac, was a regular user of arsenic and patent medicines containing poisonous chemicals and had a number of mistresses, one of whom bore him five children. Florence meanwhile entered into several liaisons of her own. One was with a local businessman, Alfred Brierley, which her husband was told about. A violent row ensued after Maybrick heard reports of Florence's relationship with Brierley, during which Maybrick assaulted her and announced his intention of seeking a divorce. The wish for divorce seemed mutual.

James Maybrick was taken ill on 27 April 1889 after Florence administered a double dose of strychnine. His doctors treated him for acute dyspepsia, but his condition deteriorated. On 8 May, Florence wrote a compromising letter to Brierley, which was intercepted by Alice Yapp, a nanny who hated Florence. Yapp intercepted all letters sent by Florence and passed them on to Maybrick's brother, Edwin, who was staying at Battlecrease. Edwin, himself by many accounts one of Florence's lovers, shared the contents of the letter with his brother Michael Maybrick, who was effectively the head of the family and who also hated Florence. By Michael's orders, Florence was immediately deposed as mistress of her house and held under house arrest. On 9 May, a nurse reported that Florence had surreptitiously tampered with a Valentine's Meat Juice bottle that was afterwards found to contain a half-grain of arsenic. Florence later testified that her husband had begged her to administer it as a pick-me-up. However, he never drank its contents.

Maybrick died at his home in Aigburth on 11 May 1889. In her memoir, Mrs. Maybrick's Own Story: My Fifteen Lost Years, Florence describes the following, as she knelt down by her late husband's bedside:

Death had wiped out the memory of many things. I was thankful to remember that I had stopped divorce proceedings, and that we had become reconciled for the children's sake.

== Murder charge ==
His brothers, suspicious as to the cause of death, had his body examined. It was found to contain slight traces of arsenic, but not enough to be considered fatal. It is uncertain whether this was taken by Maybrick himself or administered by another person. In April 1889, Florence Maybrick was accused of using flypaper containing arsenic from a local chemist's shop and later soaked in a bowl of water. After an inquest held in a nearby hotel, Florence was charged with his murder and stood trial at St George's Hall, Liverpool, before Mr. Justice Stephen, where she was convicted and sentenced to death.

Some newspaper articles characterized her trial as a miscarriage of justice, also claiming the prosecution evidence was unpersuasive. After the verdict, crowds of supporters staged protests in Florence's support.

After a public outcry, Henry Matthews, the Home Secretary, and Lord Chancellor Halsbury concluded 'that the evidence clearly establishes that Mrs Maybrick administered poison to her husband with intent to murder, but that there is ground for reasonable doubt whether the arsenic so administered was in fact the cause of his death'. The death sentence was commuted to life imprisonment as punishment for a crime with which she was never charged. During the 1890s, new evidence was publicized by Florence's supporters, but there was no possibility of an appeal, and the Home Office was not inclined to release her in spite of the strenuous efforts of Lord Russell of Killowen, the Lord Chief Justice.

The case became something of a cause célèbre and attracted considerable newspaper coverage on both sides of the Atlantic. Arsenic was then regarded by some men as an aphrodisiac and tonic, and Maybrick had certainly taken it on a regular basis. A city chemist confirmed that he had supplied Maybrick with quantities of the poison over a lengthy period and a search of Battlecrease House later turned up enough to kill at least fifty people. Although her marriage was clearly over in all but name, Florence had little motive to murder her husband. The financial provision Maybrick had made for her and his children in his will was paltry and she might have been far better off with him alive but legally separated from him. Many people held the view that Florence had poisoned her husband because he was about to divorce her which, in Victorian society, would see her ruined. An even more compelling motive might have been the prospect of losing the custody of her beloved children.

After fifteen years of research, writer and film director Bruce Robinson published They All Love Jack: Busting the Ripper (2015), intended as a comprehensive study of Jack the Ripper (James was posthumously identified as a possible Ripper suspect). Robinson makes a case that Florence and her husband were the victims of her brother-in-law, Michael, whom Robinson claims was actually the Ripper.

== Incarceration ==
HM Prison Aylesbury, shortly after construction in 1847

Following the commutation of Florence's sentence, she was transported to Woking District Female Convict Prison, where she remained until 1896 when she was moved to Aylesbury Prison. Florence spent her first nine months in solitary confinement before being moved to a different cell but remaining under the strictures of the silent system, whereby silence was enforced at all times. Her memoirs reveal the physical and mental toll that solitary confinement had on her. She dubbed the practice 'by far the most cruel feature of English penal servitude' and emphasised the 'desolation and despair' that the 'hopeless monotony' of confinement led her to feel. During her time at Woking, Florence suffered from insomnia and frequent ill health caused, she claimed, by the frequent shrieking and destruction of the content of cells during the night by weak-minded inmates, which left her with 'quivering nerves' and unable to sleep.

Having passed through the first stages of solitary confinement and a probationary period, Maybrick then entered a third stage of hard labour whereby she was permitted to leave her cell during the day to assist in carrying meals from the kitchen. Her day commenced at 6.00 a.m. and ended at 5.30 p.m., during which she had, according to her memoirs, to wash ten four-quart cans, scrub one twenty-foot table and two twelve-foot dressers, clean knives, wash a sack of potatoes, assist in serving the dinners and scrub a piece of floor twenty by ten feet. During 1896, Maybrick entered into the prison infirmary for two weeks, suffering from a 'feverish cold' caused, she claimed, by the inadequate clothing, bedding and draughty cells. It was at the end of her time in the infirmary on 4 November 1896 that she was transferred to Aylesbury prison.

Maybrick did speak well of the warders she encountered during her incarceration, describing their 'patience, civility, and self-control'.

== Release ==
After detention in Woking and Aylesbury prisons, Florence was released in January 1904, having spent more than 14 years in custody. Although she had lost her U.S. citizenship when she married her British husband, it was restored when she returned to her home country. Initially she earned a living on the lecture circuit, speaking on prison reform and protesting her innocence. In later life, she moved to Connecticut and used her maiden name, Florence Elizabeth Chandler. After some months spent unsuccessfully as a housekeeper, Florence became a recluse, living in a squalid three-room bungalow in Gaylordsville, Connecticut, a village in New Milford, with only her cats for company. A few sympathetic residents eventually discovered Florence's true identity but kept her secret.

Florence Maybrick died alone and penniless in her home in New Milford on 23 October 1941, and the next day her obituary was published at the top of Page One of The New York Times. She was buried at her request next to her dear friend, Clara Dulon, in South Kent, Connecticut on the grounds of South Kent School. Among her few possessions were a scrapbook with newspaper clippings of her former life and a tattered family Bible. She never saw her children again; they were raised by the family's doctor. Her son, who became a mining engineer, died in 1911 of accidental poisoning when he mistook a cyanide solution for a glass of water.

Soon after her release, Florence wrote a book about her experiences, Mrs. Maybrick's Own Story: My Fifteen Lost Years, which is available online. A rare copy is still held by Liverpool City Libraries.

== Books and pamphlets ==
- Boswell, Charles, and Lewis Thompson. The Girl with the Scarlet Brand (1954).
- Christie, Trevor L. Etched in Arsenic (1968).
- Colquhoun, Kate. Did She Kill Him?: A Victorian Tale of Deception, Adultery and Arsenic (2014).
- Daisy Bank Print. and Pub. Co. Full Account of the Life & Trial of Mrs. Maybrick: Interesting Details of her Earlier Life (ca. 1901).
- Densmore, Helen. The Maybrick Case (1892).
- Graham, Anne E. and Carol Emmas. “ The Last Victim : The extraordinary life of Florence Maybrick” (1999).
- Irving, Henry B. Trial of Mrs. Maybrick (Notable English Trials series, 1912).
- Irving, Henry B. "Mrs. Maybrick", in James H. Hodge (ed.), Famous Trials III (Penguin, 1950) pp. 97–134
- J.L.F. The Maybrick Case: A Treatise Showing Conclusive Reasons for the Continued Public Dissent from the Verdict and "Decision." (1891).
- L.E.X. Is Mrs. Maybrick guilty?: A Defence Shewing that the Verdict of Guilty is not Founded on Fact, and is Inconsistent with the Presence of a Strong Element of Doubt; with Reasons for Mrs. Maybrick's Release (1889).
- Levy, J. H. The Necessity for Criminal Appeal: As Illustrated by the Maybrick Case and the Jurisprudence of Various Countries (1899).
- MacDougall, Alexander. The Maybrick Case (1891 and 1896).
- Mason, Eleanor. Florie Chandler: or, The Secret to the Maybrick Poisoning Case (1890).
- Maybrick, Florence E. Mrs. Maybrick's Own Story: My Fifteen Lost Years (1904).
- Morland, Nigel. This Friendless Lady (1957).
- Robinson, Bruce They All Love Jack: Busting the Ripper (Fourth Estate, 2015)
- Ryan Jr., Bernard. The Poisoned Life of Mrs. Maybrick (1977).
- Tidy, Charles Meymott and Rawdon Macnamara. The Maybrick Trial: A Toxicological Study (1890).
- Hutto, Richard Jay, "A Poisoned Life: Florence Chandler Maybrick, the First American Woman Sentenced to Death in England," McFarland Publishers (2018). www.poisonedlife.com

== Dramas and broadcasts ==
The Maybrick case was dramatised on the radio series The Black Museum in 1952 under the title of "Meat Juice".

The 1952 film noir, A Blueprint for Murder, mentions Florence Maybrick, along with other alleged poison murderesses Madeleine Smith and Lyda Trueblood.

The case featured as an episode of the 1970 six-part ITV series Wicked Women with Florence played by Nicola Pagett.

The BBC Radio series John Mortimer Presents Sensational British Trials featured an episode about the Maybrick case, entitled "The Case of the Liverpool Poisoner".

Maybrick was played by Fiona Clarke and as an older woman by Margaret Robertson in a BBC radio drama about the case, by David Goodland and entitled The Voice of Angels, which was first broadcast on BBC Radio 4 in 2003.

Maybrick is mentioned in an episode of television show Law & Order: Criminal Intent called "Sound Bodies" from season 3, episode 8 about an arsenic poisoning at a church.

The case was re-examined in the BBC programme Murder, Mystery and My Family (series 4, episode 2) and revisited in Case Closed? (Series 4, episode 1).

The case is discussed in the chapter "Murder revisited: the guilt of Florence Maybrick", in "The Elements of Murder" by John Emsley. He finds the evidence against her convincing.

== Fictional adaptations ==
- Ackroyd, Peter. Dan Leno and the Limehouse Golem (1994).
- Sayers, Dorothy L. Strong Poison (1930).
- Shearing, Joseph. Airing in a Closed Carriage (1943).

== See also ==
- William Herbert Wallace
- Ann Bilansky
