= Eltham Common =

Place in south east London, England

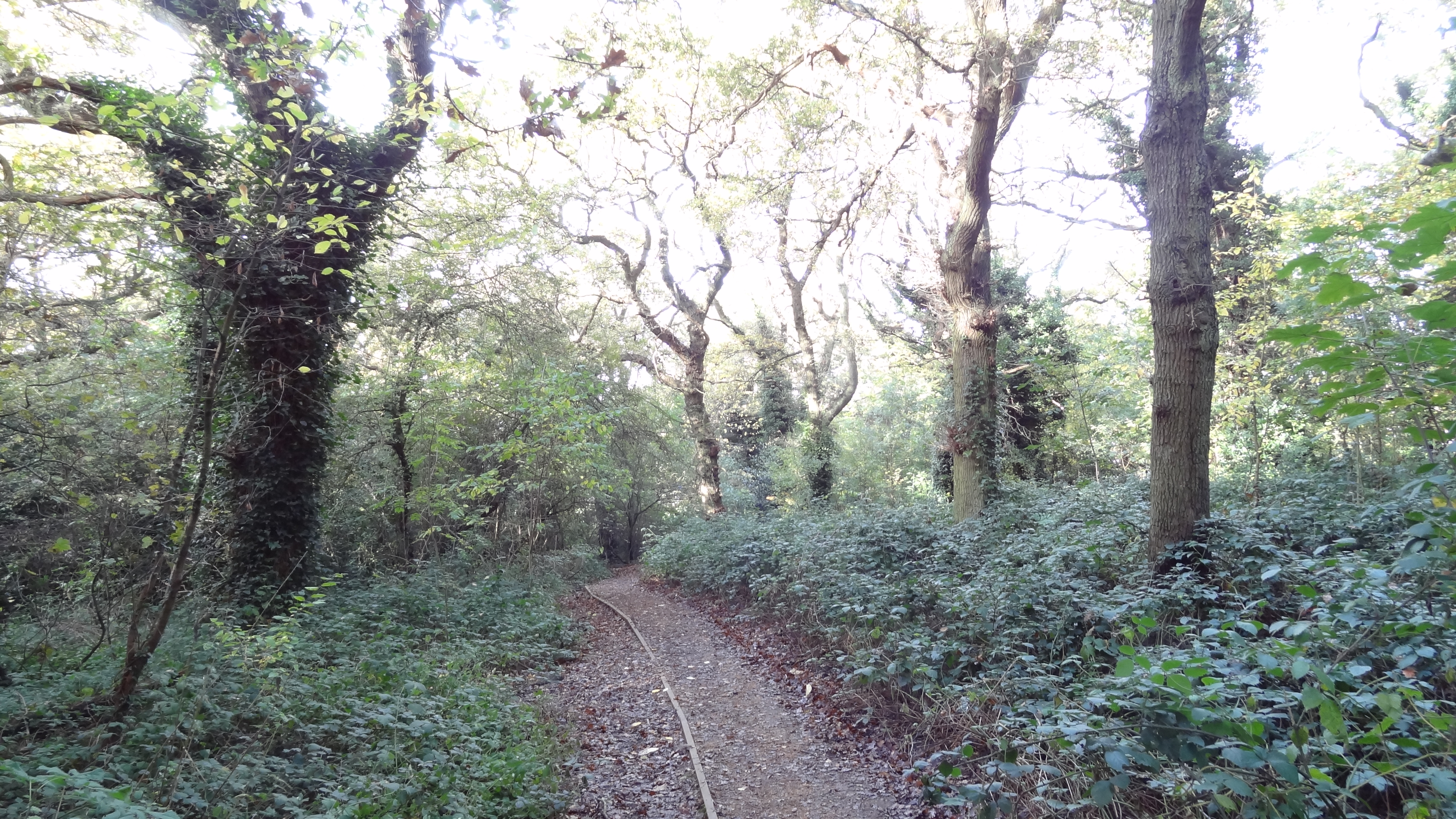
- Eltham Common, Shooters Hill, London
- Interactive map of Eltham Common
- Type: common land
- Location: Woolwich, London
- Coordinates: 51.4693°N 0.0573°E
- Area: 13 hectares (32 acres)

Eltham Common is a park and area of common land in the Royal Borough of Greenwich in south-east London. Forming an approximate triangle between Well Hall Road and Shooter's Hill, it is part of a larger continuous area of woodland and parkland on the south side of Shooter's Hill: other parts are Jack Wood, Castle Wood, Oxleas Meadows, Falconwood Field, Oxleas Wood and Eltham Park North.

Together with the nearby woodlands in Shooter's Hill, it was once infamous for robbers and highwaymen - they would charge 'protection money' for safe passage even though a gibbet was once sited on the Common's north-west corner as a deterrent. In February 1918 the Common was the site of the murder of Nellie Grace ('Peggy') Trew, a clerk at Woolwich Arsenal returning from changing a book at Plumstead Library - it became known as the "Badge and Button Murder" after an overcoat button and an imitation Gordon Highlanders or Leicestershire Regiment cap or collar badge which were key pieces of prosecution evidence and remain in the Crime Museum at Scotland Yard. RAMC-veteran David Greenwood was found guilty and sentenced to death, but this was commuted to penal servitude for life on 31 May 1918, the eve of his execution - he was released in 1933.

The Office of Woods and Forests bought the Common in 1812, assigning it to the War Department but allowing public access. Woolwich Borough Council and the London County Council both applied to take over the Common during the early 20th century, but it was only as a result of the green belt legislation of 1938 that the latter acquired almost 13 hectares of the Common from the War Department.
