= Thomas Lionel Hardy =

- Born: 15 April 1887; Mansfield, Nottinghamshire
- Died: 16 May 1969 (aged 82)
- Occupation: Gastroenterologist
- Known for: Development of effective rubber-based ileostomy bag

Thomas Lionel Hardy FRCP (1887–1969) was a British physician and pioneering gastroenterologist.

After education at Radley College, T. Lionel Hardy studied at Selwyn College, Cambridge, and studied medicine at the Middlesex Hospital. He qualified MRCS, LRCP in 1912 and graduated MB BChir in 1913 from the University of Cambridge. After junior medical appointments at the Middlesex Hospital and at Great Ormond Street Hospital, he qualified MRCP in 1914 and then immediately joined the RAMC. During WWI he served on the western front, reached the rank of major in charge of the medical division of a casualty clearing station, and was mentioned in despatches.

In 1919 Hardy was appointed an assistant physician to the Queen Elizabeth Hospital Birmingham. In 1925 he received the higher MD from the University of Cambridge. He was elected FRCP in 1929. In 1944 he was the Royal College of Physicians's Croonian Lecturer on Order and disorder in the large intestine. In 1948 he was appointed by the University of Birmingham to a personal chair in gastroenterology.

He was a founder member of the British Society of Gastroenterology and its first honorary secretary. He described the birth of the Society as taking place at the top of the main staircase of the Athenaeum, where Hurst had collected a group of friends: John Ryle, L. J. Witts, Letheby Tidy, and himself.

In 1948 Hardy read a report of an American ileostomy bag. Hardy, (William) Trevor Cooke, Clifford Hawkins, and the surgeon Bryan N. Brooke, with the help of the research department of the Dunlop Company in Birmingham, developed and tested their own successful version of the rubber-based ileostomy bag. This revolutionised the therapy for ulcerative colitis.

In 1914 T. Lionel Hardy married Elizabeth Clarke Ritchie. They had three sons and one daughter. After his first wife died in 1952, he married Margaret Askham in 1954 in Malvern, Worcestershire.
