= James Maybrick =

British merchant, murder victim, and Jack the Ripper suspect (1838–1889)

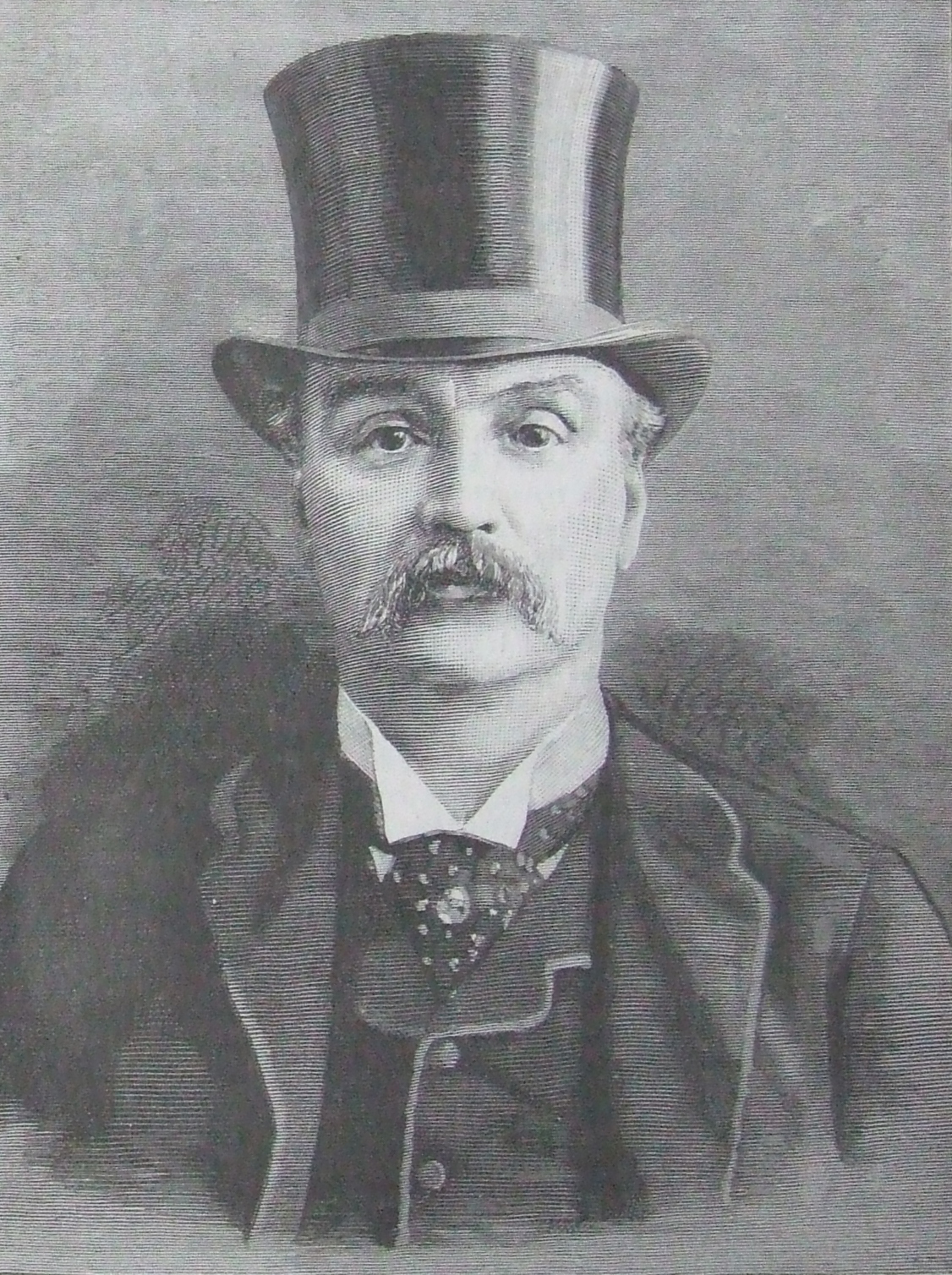
- Born: 24 October 1838; Liverpool, England
- Died: 11 May 1889 (aged 50); Aigburth, England
- Resting place: Anfield Cemetery
- Occupation: Cotton merchant
- Known for: Jack the Ripper suspect
- Spouse(s): Sarah Ann Robertson (ended) Florence Chandler (m. 1881)
- Children: 2
- Relatives: Michael Maybrick (brother)

James Maybrick (24 October 1838 – 11 May 1889) was a British cotton merchant. After his death, his wife, Florence Maybrick, was convicted of murdering him by poisoning in a sensational trial. The "Aigburth Poisoning" case was widely reported in the press on both sides of the Atlantic.

In 1992, Maybrick was accused of being the notorious serial killer Jack the Ripper, based on the discovery of a diary which contained an account allegedly written by Maybrick himself. Critics countered that the diary and confession were a hoax, but forensic tests were inconclusive. Michael Barrett, who claimed discovery of the diary, signed a sworn statement saying the diary was a forgery, but the Ripper hypothesis retains defenders.

There have also been attempts to link Maybrick to the murders of the Servant Girl Annihilator, who killed several women during 1884 and 1885 in the city of Austin, Texas.

In his book They All Love Jack, writer, researcher, and filmmaker Bruce Robinson produced an argument that it was James’s brother, Michael Maybrick, who was the true poisoner who killed James.

== Life ==
Maybrick was born in Liverpool, the son of William Maybrick, an engraver, and his wife, Susanna. He was christened on 12 November 1838, at St Peter's Church in the city. He was named after a brother who had died the year before and was the Maybricks' third of seven sons.

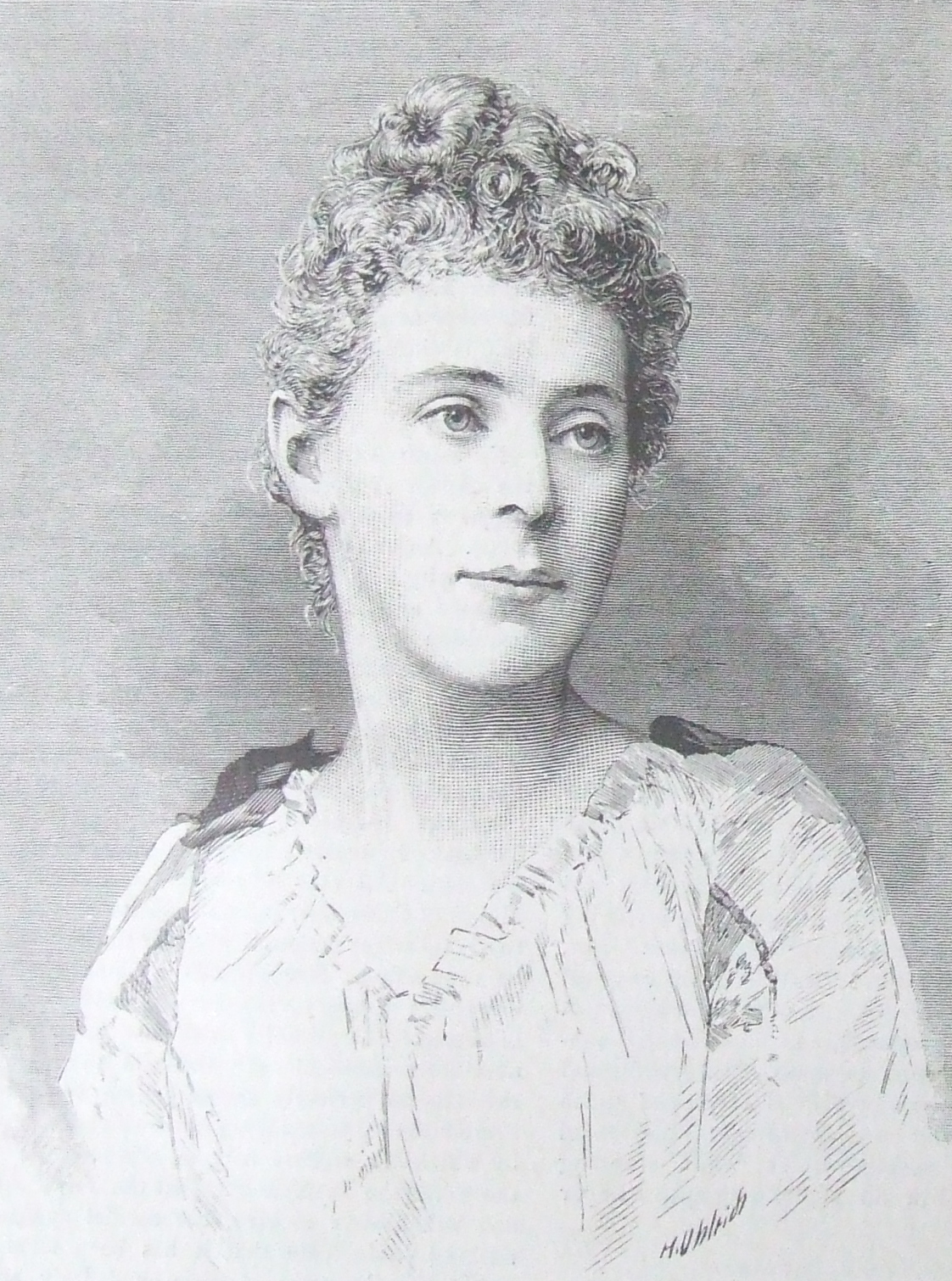
Mrs Florence Maybrick was convicted of James' death

Maybrick's cotton trading business required him to travel regularly to the United States and in 1871 he settled in Norfolk, Virginia, to establish a branch office of his company. While there in 1874 he contracted malaria, which was then treated with a medication containing arsenic; he became addicted to the drug for the rest of his life. In 1880, Maybrick returned to the company's offices in Britain. Sailing from New York City on 12 March 1880, he arrived in Liverpool six days later. During the journey he was introduced to Florence (Florie) Elizabeth Chandler, the daughter of a banker from Mobile, Alabama, and their relationship quickly blossomed. Despite the difference in their ages – he was 42, and she 18 – they began to plan their wedding immediately.

The wedding was delayed until 27 July 1881, when it took place at St James' Church, Piccadilly, London. The couple returned to Liverpool to live at Maybrick's home, "Battlecrease House" in Aigburth, a suburb in the south of the city.

They had two children: a son, James Chandler ("Bobo"), born in 1882, and a daughter, Gladys Evelyn, born in 1886.

Maybrick continued to divide his time between the American and the British offices of his company and this may have caused difficulties within his marriage. He also resumed his relationships with his many mistresses, while his wife conducted an affair with an Alfred Brierley, a cotton broker. It is possible Florence embarked upon this on learning of her husband's infidelity.

In Maybrick's case a common-law wife, Sarah Ann Robertson, was identified. Sarah Ann is mentioned in her stepfather's will as "Sarah Ann Maybrick, wife of James".

== Death ==
Maybrick's health deteriorated suddenly on 27 April 1889, and he died fifteen days later at his home in Aigburth. The circumstances of his death were deemed suspicious by his brothers and an inquest, held in a local hotel, came to the verdict that arsenic poisoning was the most likely cause, administered by persons unknown.

Suspicion immediately fell on Florence, and she was arrested some days later. She stood trial at St George's Hall, Liverpool, and after lengthy proceedings, the fairness of which was the subject of some debate in later years, she was convicted of murder and sentenced to death. The way in which the judge conducted her trial was questioned, and this may have been the reason her sentence was commuted to life imprisonment, some of which she served in a prison in Woking, Surrey, and then at the "House of Detention" at Aylesbury, Buckinghamshire.

A re-examination of her case resulted in her release in 1904. She supported herself through various occupations until her death on 23 October 1941. From her initial incarceration until her death, she never saw her children again.

An episode of the BBC TV programme Murder, Mystery and My Family, broadcast on 27 July 2020, investigated whether Florence Maybrick's conviction held credibility when investigated by modern-day means. The investigation was undertaken by Jeremy Dein QC (defence) and Sasha Wass QC (prosecution) and their findings were put before Crown Court Judge David Radford. From their investigations it appeared that Mrs Maybrick was subjected to the Victorian morality code by the judge and the jury. The judge in the Maybrick murder trial delivered his summing-up to the jury for two days. Modern experts, assisting the QCs, stated that Victorian society used arsenic as a beauty aid, and for someone like Mrs Maybrick to extract a small amount of the poison from flypaper would have been commonplace. In addition, the arsenic found in James Maybrick's liver was 20 milligrams and a fatal dose would be more likely 100 milligrams. It was also discovered that Mr Maybrick had been self-prescribing medicines; he was taking a large amount of drugs, and only two of these drugs did not contain poison. As James Maybrick grew sicker, his brothers insisted that Florence be forbidden access to James, however, he grew yet sicker, and died. A modern-day expert on Victorian society was consulted by the QCs, and was asked whether the admission by way of a letter of a love affair between Mrs Maybrick and an associate of Mr Maybrick could in any way be reflected in the judge's summing-up, thus prejudicing the jury.

Judge David Radford said that the trial judge had presented a case against Mrs Maybrick based on Victorian attitudes to sexual scandal, and in his two-day summing up had blindsided the jury into giving a guilty verdict of murder by undermining her character. Therefore, in Radford's opinion the verdict was unsafe.

== Family ==
After their mother's conviction and imprisonment, Maybrick's children James and Gladys Evelyn were taken in by a Dr. Charles Chinner Fuller and his wife Gertrude, and the younger James changed his name to Fuller.

James Fuller became a mining engineer in British Columbia. In 1911, at the age of 29, while working at the Le Roi Gold Mine in Canada, he died after drinking cyanide, apparently thinking it was just a glass of water. His sister Gladys went to live in Ryde, Isle of Wight, with her uncle and aunt Michael and Laura (née Withers) Maybrick before marrying Frederick James Corbyn in Hampstead, London, in 1912. She died in South Wales in 1971, where the couple lived in their later years.

James Maybrick's brother, Michael Maybrick, was a composer who published many pieces and songs under the name Stephen Adams. "Good Company" is one such example, but by far his best known work was the hymn "The Holy City".

== Jack the Ripper diary ==
In 1992, a document presented as James Maybrick's diary surfaced, which claimed that he was Jack the Ripper. The diary's author does not mention his own name, but offers enough hints and references consistent with Maybrick's established life and habits that it is obvious readers are expected to believe it is him. The author of the document details alleged actions and crimes over a period of several months, taking credit for slaying the five victims most commonly credited to Jack the Ripper as well as for two other murders which have to date not been historically identified.

The diary was first introduced to the world by Michael Barrett, an unemployed former Liverpool scrap metal dealer, who claimed at the time that it had been given to him by a friend, Tony Devereux, in a pub. When this was queried, the story changed. Barrett's wife Ann, formerly Graham, said that the diary had been in her family for as long as she could remember. She had asked Devereux to give it to her husband because he had literary aspirations and she thought he might write a book about it. She had not wanted to tell him her family owned it because she thought he would ask her father about it and relations between the two men were strained. It was published as The Diary of Jack the Ripper in 1993 to great controversy. Few experts gave it any credence from the outset, and most immediately dismissed it as a hoax, though some were open to the possibility it might be genuine. Debate was often heated, and one writer notes that the "saga of the Maybrick diary is confusing, complicated and inescapably tortuous."

Tests carried out on the ink used in the diary produced contradictory findings. The first test, using thin layer chromatography (TLC) revealed the ink contained no iron, and was based on a synthetic dye called nigrosine, patented and commercially available in 1867, and in general use in writing inks by the 1870s. The second TLC test found nothing in the ink inconsistent with the date of 1888, and that the ink contained iron and sodium, but no nigrosine. The third TLC test found nothing inconsistent with the Victorian period. A fourth TLC test was attempted, but could not be carried out.

Several tests were carried out to find out whether the ink contained chloroacetamide, a preservative, in an effort to definitively date the ink. According to one source, chloroacetamide was introduced into the Merck Index in 1857, but not used commercially in ink until 1972. In 1995, Dr Earl Morris of the Dow Chemical Company stated that chloroacetamide has been found in preparations as early as 1857. A fourth test, this time using gas chromatography, found chloroacetamide present, at 6.5 parts per million. A fifth TLC test found traces of chloroacetamide, but this was attributed to contamination from the control. The test was carried out again, and no chloroacetamide was found.

Among the investigators were sceptic Joe Nickell and document expert Kenneth W. Rendell. In Rendell's analysis, he was struck that the handwriting style seemed more 20th century than Victorian. He also noted factual contradictions and handwriting inconsistencies. Rendell’s suspicion was also piqued that the diary was written in a genuine Victorian scrapbook, but with the first 20 pages at the front end torn out. He believed there was no sensible explanation for the purported author to use such a book, and fraud more plausibly explained removing the first 20 pages.

In January 1995, Michael Barrett swore in two separate affidavits that he was "the author of the Manuscript written by my wife Anne Barrett at my dictation which is known as The Jack the Ripper Diary." Adding to the confusion, however, was Barrett's solicitor's subsequent repudiation of his affidavit, then Barrett's withdrawal of the repudiation.

Some people, including Robert Smith, the present owner of the diary and original publisher of the associated book by Shirley Harrison, insist it may be genuine. They argue that scientific dating methods have established that the book and ink used to write in it are from the 19th century; that the symptoms of arsenic addiction, claimed to be described accurately in the book, are known to very few persons; that some details of the murders provided in it were known only to police and the Ripper himself before the book's publication; and that one of the original crime scene photographs shows the initials "F. M." written on a wall behind the victim's body in what appears to be blood. These, they claim, refer to Florence Maybrick, James's wife, whose possible infidelities were the purported motivation for the murders. These claims are dismissed by the majority of experts.

=== Pocket watch ===
In June 1993, a gentleman's pocket watch, made by William Verity of Rothwell (near Leeds) in 1847 or 1848, was presented by Albert Johnson of Wallasey. The watch has "J. Maybrick" scratched on the inside cover, along with the words "I am Jack", as well as the initials of the five canonical Ripper victims. The watch was examined in 1993 by Dr Stephen Turgoose of the Corrosion and Protection Centre at the University of Manchester Institute of Science and Technology, using an electron microscope. He stated:

"On the basis of the evidence...especially the order in which the markings were made, it is clear that the engravings pre-date the vast majority of superficial surface scratch marks...the wear apparent on the engravings, evidenced by the rounded edges of the markings and 'polishing out' in places, would indicate a substantial age...whilst there is no evidence which would indicate a recent (last few years) origin...it must be emphasised that there are no features observed which conclusively prove the age of the engravings. They could have been produced recently, and deliberately artificially aged by polishing, but this would have been a complex multi-stage process...many of the features are only resolved by the scanning electron microscope, not being readily apparent in optical microscopy, and so, if they were of recent origin, the engraver would have to be aware of the potential evidence available from this technique, indicating a considerable skill and scientific awareness".

In 1994, the watch was taken to the Interface Analysis Centre at Bristol University and studied by Dr Robert Wild using an electron microscope and Auger electron spectroscopy. Dr Wild found that:

"Provided the watch has remained in a normal environment, it would seem likely that the engravings were at least several tens of years age...in my opinion it is unlikely that anyone would have sufficient expertise to implant aged, brass particles into the base of the engravings".

== Bibliography ==
- Harrison, S. 2003. Jack the Ripper: The American Connection, ISBN 978-1-85782-590-9
