= Charles Meymott Tidy =

Charles Meymott Tidy (1843–1892) was an English medical man and sanitary chemist, a barrister who wrote also on legal matters.

== Life ==
Born on 2 February 1843, he was the son of William Callender Tidy, a physician in South Hackney and his wife, Charlotte Meymott. After private schools he went to the Hackney Church of England school, and then entered as a student at the London Hospital under Henry Letheby, becoming M.R.C.S. and L.S.A. in 1864.

In 1865 Tidy entered the University of Aberdeen, and in 1866 graduated C.M. and M.B. with the highest honours. On his return to London he took up his father's medical practice at Hackney, and continued in practice for about ten years. During this period he was also associated at the London Hospital with Letheby, as joint lecturer in chemistry, and became interested in questions of sanitary reform and public health. On the death of Letheby in 1876 Tidy succeeded to his appointments as professor of chemistry, medical jurisprudence, and public health, and later was called to the bar and appointed reader in medical jurisprudence to the Inns of Court.

Tidy also became public analyst and deputy medical officer of health for the City of London, medical officer of health for Islington, and official analyst to the Home Office. At the trial of Florence Maybrick, he testified that he had attended nearly 1000 post mortems.

In 1881 Tidy was appointed by the London water companies, with William Odling and William Crookes, to examine the quality of the water supplied to the metropolis. He died at his residence in London on 15 March 1892.

== Works ==
Tidy gained a reputation and a large practice as an expert in water supply and the treatment of sewage. In 1879 he published a paper on The Processes for determining the Organic Purity of Potable Waters (Journal of the Chemical Society, 1879, p. 46), in which he proposed a modification of Johan Georg Forchhammer's original process for determining the amount of organic matter in waters by oxidation with potassium permanganate. This method was adopted by water analysts, and became known as "Tidy's process". In 1880 he published a major paper River Water (Journ. Chem. Soc. 1880, p. 268).

Tidy wrote works on legal medicine and chemical science, and also published technical papers and pamphlets. They included:

- A Handy Book of Forensic Medicine and Toxicology (with William Bathurst Woodman), 1877.
- A Handbook of Modern Chemistry, 1878.
- Legal Medicine, 2 vols. 1882–3. This work perpetuated the myth of growth of nails after death.
- The Story of a Tinder Box, 1889.
- Medical Law for Medical Men (with Percy Clarke), 1890.

Tidy also published lectures and papers:

- Coal and its Products, two lectures, 1867.
- An Analysis of Human Milk ("London Hospital Reports"), 1867.
- On Poisoning by Colocynth (The Lancet), 1868.
- On Poisoning by Opium (Medical Times and Gazette), 1868.
- Development: an Introductory Lecture at the London Hospital, 1869.
- Reports on Chemistry in Dobell's Reports on the Progress of Medicine, 1869–70.
- On Ammonia in the Urine in Health and Disease with William Bathurst Woodman, (Roy. Soc. Proc. 1872, xx. 362).
- Religion and Health, 1874.
- The Cantor Lectures, 1873, on the Practical Applications of Optics to the Arts and Manufactures and to Medicine, 1873.
- The London Water Supply, 1878.
- The Treatment of Sewage (Journal of the Society of Arts), 1886.
- The Maybrick Trial: a Toxicological Study (with Rawdon Macnamara), 1890.

== Family ==
In 1875 Tidy married Violet Fordham Dobell, daughter of Horace Dobell, by whom he had a son, the royal physician Henry Letheby Tidy, and a daughter, both of whom survived him.

== Notes ==
Attribution This article incorporates text from a publication now in the public domain: Lee, Sidney, ed. (1898). "Tidy, Charles Meymott". Dictionary of National Biography. Vol. 56. London: Smith, Elder & Co.
