= Leslie John Witts =

British physician and pioneering haematologist

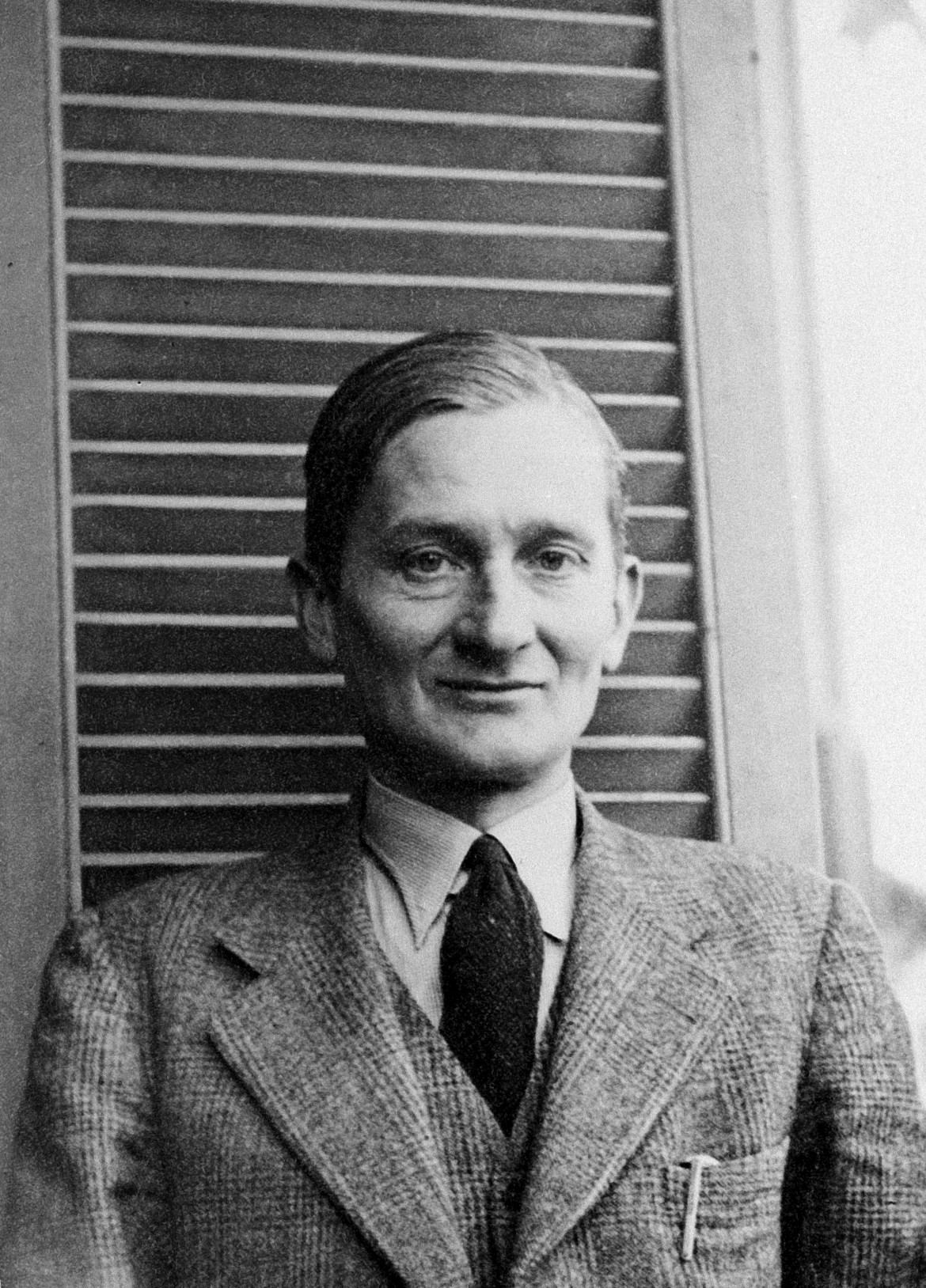
- Leslie John Witts photograph by Brigadier Sidney Smith; Courtesy of Wellcome Trust
- Born: 21 April 1898; Warrington, England
- Died: 19 November 1982 (aged 84); Oxford, England, UK
- Occupations: Haematologist and gastroenterologist
- Known for: Research on microcytic anaemia

Leslie John Witts CBE FRCP (1898–1982) was a British physician and pioneering haematologist.

== Biography ==
L. J. Witts received secondary education at Boteler Grammar School, where he won in 1916 a scholarship to the University of Manchester. During WWI when he reached the age of 18 he joined the Inns of Court Officers Training Corps and then the Royal Field Artillery. Serving on the western front, he suffered a leg wound and was invalided back to civilian life. From 1919 to 1923 he studied at the University of Manchester, graduating there MB ChB in 1923. After house appointments, he became Dickinson travelling scholar of the University of Manchester and graduated there in 1926 with his higher MD thesis on blood research. He qualified MRCP in 1926.

In 1926 Howard Florey became a Fellow of Gonville and Caius College, Cambridge and vacated his John Lucas Walker Studentship at the University of Cambridge. This studentship was filled by Witts, who worked from 1926 to 1928 in the department of pathology of the University of Cambridge.

In 1928 he joined the professorial medical unit of the London Hospital and in 1929 became assistant physician at Guy's Hospital. While there he published an article in the BMJ on chronic microcytic anaemia that was so comprehensive and inclusive that the condition was often called Witts anaemia for the next decade.

In 1931 he was elected FRCP. In 1932 he gave the Goulstonian Lectures on Pathology and treatment of anaemia. After junior appointments in Cambridge, in the US, and at Guy's Hospital, he was appointed in 1933 a full physician and in 1935 a professor of medicine at St Bartholomew's Hospital.

The four years which he spent at Bart's were important, and marked by his studies on iron-deficiency anaemia, on the treatment of haematemesis, and on the dangers of ritual purgation, a contribution which deserves to be ranked with Richard Asher’s later questioning of the value of arbitrary periods of rest in bed.

From 1933 to 1937 at St Bartholomew's Hospital, Leslie Witts closely collaborated with the surgical unit, which was directed by James Paterson Ross. In 1937 Witts was appointed the first Nuffield professor of clinical medicine at the University of Oxford. He held the professorship until retirement in 1965 with successor Paul Beeson. For about 30 years Witts ran the weekly post-graduate case conferences at the Radcliffe Infirmary.

When he went to Oxford he made haematology and gastroenterology the principle interests of his department. The isolation of vitamin B_{12} gave a big impetus to the study of pernicious anaemia. The development of radioactive isotopes, coupled with the construction of the Oxford Shadow Shield total body counter in the Nuffield department of medicine, enabled many studies to be made on the absorption of iron and vitamin B_{12}.

In 1937 he was a co-founder of the British Society of Gastroenterology along with Arthur Frederick Hurst, John Ryle, Henry Letheby Tidy, and Lionel Hardy. Witts wrote about his opinions on medicine as ‘Doctor Don’ in 1939 in The Lancet and, years later, in the ‘Personal Views’ series in the British Medical Journal.

He was appointed CBE in 1959. Under the auspices of the Royal College of Physicians, he delivered in 1961 the Lumleian Lectures on Some aspects of the pathology of anaemia and in 1971 the Harveian Oration on The medical professorial unit.

In 1929 in Cambridge he married Nancy Grace Salzman (1907–1992), younger daughter of the historian Louis Francis Salzman. When L. J. Witts died in 1982 he was survived by his widow, one son, three daughters, and ten grandchildren.

== Selected publications ==
=== Articles ===
- Witts, L. J. (4 September 1948). "The Problems of Clinical Research". Br Med J. 2 (4574): 455–459. doi:10.1136/bmj.2.4574.455. PMC 2091939. PMID 18881272.
- Truelove, S. C.; Witts, L. J. (14 February 1959). "Cortisone and Corticotrophin in Ulcerative Colitis". Br Med J. 1 (5119): 387–394. doi:10.1136/bmj.1.5119.387. PMC 1992572. PMID 13618646.
- Witts, L. J. (21 May 1960). "Traditional Tutorial Wisdom". Br Med J. 1 (5185): 1550–1551. doi:10.1136/bmj.1.5185.1550-a. PMC 1967865.
- Bock, O. A.; Witts, L. J. (6 July 1963). "Gastric Acidity and Gastric Biopsy in Thyrotoxicosis". Br Med J. 2 (5348): 20–24. doi:10.1136/bmj.2.5348.20. PMC 1872083. PMID 20789883.
- Witts, L. J. (6 November 1965). "Adverse reactions to drugs". Br Med J. 2 (5470): 1081–1086. doi:10.1136/bmj.2.5470.1081. PMC 1846898. PMID 5838408.
- Witts, L. J. (21 March 1970). "Personal View". Br Med J. 1 (5698): 752. doi:10.1136/bmj.1.5698.752. PMC 1699880.
- Witts, L. J. (21 November 1970). "Personal View". Br Med J. 4 (5733): 491. doi:10.1136/bmj.4.5733.491. PMC 1820143.
- Witts, L. J. (24 April 1971). "Personal View". Br Med J. 2 (5755): 220. doi:10.1136/bmj.2.5755.220. PMC 1795325.
- Witts, L. J. (6 November 1971). "The medical professorial unit". Br Med J. 4 (5783): 319–323. doi:10.1136/bmj.4.5783.319. PMC 1799398. PMID 5124408. (Harveian Oration)
- Witts, L. J. (1 April 1972). "Personal View". Br Med J. 2 (5804): 43. doi:10.1136/bmj.2.5804.43. PMC 1789035.
- Witts, L. J. (25 November 1972). "Porphyria and George 3rd". Br Med J. 4 (5838): 479–480. doi:10.1136/bmj.4.5838.479. PMC 1786738. PMID 4569551.
- Witts, L. J. (15 July 1972). "Personal View". Br Med J. 3 (5819): 171. doi:10.1136/bmj.3.5819.171. PMC 1788559.
- Witts, L. J. (5 May 1973). "Personal View". Br Med J. 2 (5861): 299. doi:10.1136/bmj.2.5861.299. PMC 1589193.
- Witts, L. J. (12 February 1977). "Personal View". Br Med J. 1 (6058): 438. doi:10.1136/bmj.1.6058.438. PMC 1604893.
- Witts, L. J. (18 March 1978). "Personal View". Br Med J. 1 (6114): 712. doi:10.1136/bmj.1.6114.712. PMC 1603071.
- Witts, L. J. (8 December 1979). "Appointment in Samarra". Br Med J. 2 (6203): 1494–1496. doi:10.1136/bmj.2.6203.1494. PMC 1597212. PMID 20792990.

=== Books ===
- Anaemia and the Alimentary Tract. 1956.
- The Stomach and Anaemia. 1966.
- Hypochronic Anaemia. 1969.
