= The Holy City (song) =

Christian hymn

- by Michael Maybrick
- Genre: Christian hymn, Spiritual
- Text: Frederic Weatherly
- Published: 1892

"The Holy City" is a religious Victorian ballad dating from 1892, with music by Michael Maybrick writing under the alias Stephen Adams, with lyrics by Frederic Weatherly. Its sheet music sales made it one of the most commercially successful songs in the UK and United States around the beginning of the 20th century, and also "perhaps the most pirated musical piece prior to the Internet", according to copyright scholar Adrian Johns. The three verses of the song describe in turn, a crowd cheering Jesus Christ's triumphal entry into Jerusalem on Palm Sunday, Jesus's crucifixion on Good Friday, and the eventual "New Jerusalem" (Zion) of universal peace and brotherhood, which is foretold in Isaiah 2:4 and Isaiah 11:6–9.

The song is recorded in the African Methodist Episcopal Church Review in 1911 as having been sung by an opera singer awaiting trial for fraud in his cell while a group of men arrested for drunk and disorderly conduct were before the judge. The men were said to have dropped to their knees as the song began "Last night I lay a-sleeping, / There came a dream so fair", the lyrics contrasting with their previous night's drunkenness. The song's conclusion resulted in the judge dismissing the men without punishment, each having learned a lesson from the song.

The song is mentioned in James Joyce's Ulysses (1922). It gained renewed popularity when it was sung by Jeanette MacDonald in the 1936 hit film San Francisco. The melody formed the basis of a spiritual titled Hosanna, which in turn was the basis for the opening of Duke Ellington's "Black and Tan Fantasy". In the 1970s it was also translated into Afrikaans and sung by South African baritone Gé Korsten under the title "Jerusalem". That version is still popular in South Africa today.
