= Henry Letheby Tidy =

British physician and gastroenterologist

Sir Henry Letheby Tidy
- Born: 28 October 1877; London
- Died: 3 June 1960 (aged 82)
- Occupation: Physician

Sir Henry "Harry" Letheby Tidy KBE FRCP (28 October 1877 – 3 June 1960) was a British physician and gastroenterologist.

== Biography ==
After education at Winchester College and then at New College, Oxford, he studied medicine at the London Hospital and graduated BM BCh Oxon in 1905. After junior appointments at the London Hospital, he studied at Freiburg and Berlin, and then was appointed demonstrator of clinical pathology at the London Hospital. In 1906 he graduated DM Oxon and also qualified MRCS (Member of the Royal College of Surgeons), LRCP (Licentiate of the Royal College of Physicians). In 1908 he qualified MRCP. In the 1920s he also held appointments to the Poplar Hospital and the Great Northern Hospital.

In WWI he joined the RAMC and attained the rank of major. In 1919, he was appointed an assistant physician to St Thomas' Hospital and was elected FRCP.

His book A Synopsis of Medicine (1920) has a general arrangement that follows Osler's The Principles and Practice of Medicine. Tidy's Synopsis had a 5th edition in 1930 and a 10th edition in 1954. He was the editor of Index of Symptomatology (1928) and the co-editor of The Medical Annual: A Yearbook of Treatment and Practitioners' Index for many years from 1934. He delivered the Lumleian Lectures in 1937. In 1937 he was a co-founder of the British Society of Gastroenterology along with Arthur Frederick Hurst, John Ryle, L. J. Witts, and Lionel Hardy. In 1938 Tidy became dean of St Thomas's Hospital Medical School.

In the inter-war years he maintained his interest in military medicine as honorary consultant to the Queen Alexandra Hospital, Millbank, and in consequence was gazetted as a colonel, R.A.M.C., and served as consultant to the Army at home from 1940 to 1942, which necessitated his retirement from the office of dean of St. Thomas's Medical School.

Tidy resigned his Army commission in 1942 and was granted the honorary rank of major-general. From 1942 to 1945 he presided over the Inter-Allied Conferences on War Medicine at the Royal Society of Medicine (of which he was also President from 1942-1944). He was the editor of the proceedings of the Inter-Allied Conferences on War Medicine published in 1947.

He was knighted in 1943. From 1946 to 1951 during each winter he was a visiting professor at the University of Cairo.

In 1936 the Duke of York appointed him Physician-in-Ordinary to the Household of the Duke of York and then, after becoming King George VI, appointed him an Extra Physician. In 1952 Sir Henry Tidy became Extra Physician to the Queen.

Henry Tidy, whose father was Charles Meymott Tidy, married in 1906 Elizabeth Catherine Ramsay. Her father was the chemist Sir William Ramsay. Henry and Elizabeth Tidy had two sons and one daughter.

He was hon. major-general in the British Army and a member of the Bath Club.

== Selected publications ==
=== Articles ===
- Tidy, H. L. (24 May 1913). "A Case of Tetanus Treated with Intraspinal Injections of Magnesium Sulphate". Br Med J. 1 (2734): 1104–1105. doi:10.1136/bmj.1.2734.1104. PMC 2298992. PMID 20766656.
- with E. B. Morley: Tidy, H. L.; Morley, E. B. (26 March 1921). "Glandular Fever". Br Med J. 1 (3143): 452–456. doi:10.1136/bmj.1.3143.452. PMC 2414819. PMID 20770231.
- Tidy, H. L. (27 December 1930). "An Address on Symptoms and Pathogenesis of the Hemorrhagic Diathesis". Br Med J. 2 (3651): 1073–1079. doi:10.1136/bmj.2.3651.1073. PMC 2452816. PMID 20775918.
- Tidy, H. (14 July 1945). "Sweating Sickness and Picardy Sweat". Br Med J. 2 (4410): 63–64. doi:10.1136/bmj.2.4410.63-a. PMC 2059374.
- Tidy, H. (4 June 1949). "Ayerza's Disease, Silicosis, and Pulmonary Bilharziasis". Br Med J. 1 (4613): 977–978. doi:10.1136/bmj.1.4613.977. PMC 2050217. PMID 18129815. (See Ayerza's disease.)
- Tidy, H. (January 1950). "Glandular Fever: Infectious Mononucleosis". Postgrad Med J. 26 (291): 9–15. doi:10.1136/pgmj.26.291.9. PMC 2530127. PMID 15402479.
- Tidy, H. (24 November 1951). "Bornholm Disease". Br Med J. 2 (4742): 1277. doi:10.1136/bmj.2.4742.1277. PMC 2070803. (See Bornholm disease.)
- Tidy, H. (5 July 1952). "Banti's Disease and Splenic Anaemia". Br Med J. 2 (4774): 1–4. doi:10.1136/bmj.2.4774.1. PMC 2020887. PMID 14935295. (See Banti's syndrome.)

=== Books ===
- A synopsis of medicine (2nd ed.). W. Wood & co. 1922.
