= Clifford Frank Hawkins =

British gastroenterologist and rheumatologist (1915–1991)

- Born: 23 December 1915; London
- Died: 5 December 1991 (aged 75)
- Occupation: Gastroenterologist
- Known for: Speaking and Writing in Medicine (1967)

Clifford Frank Hawkins FRCP (1915–1991) was a British gastroenterologist and rheumatologist.

== Biography ==
After education at Dulwich College, Clifford F. Hawkins studied at the medical school of Guy's Hospital, where he graduated MB BS in 1939. During WWII, he served briefly in the RAMC before being invalided out. He then served in the EMS during the remainder of the war. In 1946, he moved to Birmingham, where Lionel Hardy mentored him. At Queen Elizabeth Hospital Birmingham, he was a senior registrar from 1946 to 1950 and a consultant physician from 1950 to 1981. From 1951 to 1981, he was a senior lecturer at the University of Birmingham. From 1955, he was also a consultant physician at Droitwich Hospital.

He received the Diploma of Anaesthesiology in 1942 and the higher MD in 1946. He was elected FRCP in 1955. He gave in 1970 the Bradshaw Lecture on Diarrhoea: changing concepts and new diagnoses.

His research interests in gastroenterology included the development of the first effective rubber-based ileostomy bag, the forerunner of modern ileostomy appliances, which have transformed the lives of many patients. His published work includes studies of macrocytic anaemia in gastrointestinal disease; immunological studies of Crohn's disease; oral glucose in reducing jejunostomy effluent, and gluten subfractions in coeliac disease.

In 1976, Hawkins and colleagues, M. Farr, C. J. Morris, A. M. Hoare, and N. Williamson, were the first to report rod-shaped organisms in synovial membrane involved in Whipple's disease.

He was outstanding in writing and lecturing. The BMJ editor Stephen Lock recommended Hawkins's book Speaking and writing in medicine for its excellence in "listening and speaking to patients" and its "commonsense, wit, and wisdom". Hawkins wrote books and articles for medical professionals and the general public. For about 10 years, he wrote a monthly column for the British Medical Journal entitled "What's new in the new editions".

Hawkins was the editor-in-chief for the Rheumatism and Arthritis Council's Reports on rheumatic diseases from 1959 to 1977. He was the president of the Heberden Society in 1982. (The Heberden Society was formed in 1936 and became, in 1983, part of the British Society for Rheumatology.)

On 22 September 1945, at Seven Oaks Congregational Church in Kent, Hawkins married Susan Fantes. They had three children.

== Selected publications ==
=== Articles ===
- with L. P. J. Holt: Holt, L. P. J.; Hawkins, C. F. (22 May 1965). "Indomethacin: studies of absorption and of the use of indomethacin suppositories". Br Med J. 1 (5446): 1354–1356. doi:10.1136/bmj.1.5446.1354. PMC 2165800. PMID 14278842.
- Hawkins, C. (7 December 1968). "Personal View". Br Med J. 4 (5631): 640. doi:10.1136/bmj.4.5631.640. PMC 1912495.
- Hawkins, C. (24 May 1969). "Personal View". Br Med J. 2 (5655): 508. doi:10.1136/bmj.2.5655.508. PMC 1983424.
- Hawkins, C. (7 November 1970). "Personal View". Br Med J. 4 (5731): 362. doi:10.1136/bmj.4.5731.362. PMC 1819687.
- Hawkins, C. (24 June 1972). "Personal View". Br Med J. 2 (5816): 764. doi:10.1136/bmj.2.5816.764. PMC 1788490.
- Hawkins, C. (24 February 1973). "Personal View". Br Med J. 1 (5851): 480. doi:10.1136/bmj.1.5851.480. PMC 1588513.
- Hawkins, C. (23 June 1973). "Problem Oriented Medical Record". Br Med J. 2 (5868): 713–714. doi:10.1136/bmj.2.5868.713. PMC 1589755. PMID 4733254.
- with A. M. Hoare: Hoare, A. M.; Hawkins, C. F. (3 July 1976). "Upper gastrointestinal endoscopy with and without sedation: patients' opinions". Br Med J. 2 (6026): 20. doi:10.1136/bmj.2.6026.20. PMC 1687717. PMID 938881.
- Hawkins, C. (6 November 1976). "Writing and speaking in medicine. Writing the MD thesis". Br Med J. 2 (6044): 1121–1124. doi:10.1136/bmj.2.6044.1121. PMC 1689440. PMID 990799.
- Hawkins, C. (3 December 1977). "Personal View". Br Med J. 2 (6100): 1473. doi:10.1136/bmj.2.6100.1473. PMC 1632610.
- Hawkins, C. (16 August 1980). "Reading for Pleasure: Hell, humour, and hobbies". Br Med J. 281 (6238): 503–504. doi:10.1136/bmj.281.6238.503. PMC 1713351. PMID 20793175.
- Hawkins, C. (24 December 1988). "After dinner speaking". BMJ. 297 (6664): 1693–1695. doi:10.1136/bmj.297.6664.1693. PMC 1838883.
- Hawkins, C. (15 April 1989). "How to survive a dinner". BMJ. 298 (6679): 1024–1026. doi:10.1136/bmj.298.6679.1024. PMC 1836314.

=== Books ===
- two chapters in John W. Todd (1960). Textbook of Clinical Medicine. London: Pitman Medical Publishing Co.
- Diseases of the alimentary tract. London: Heinemann, 1963. 22 October 2013. ISBN 9781483195520. https://www.science.org/doi/10.1126/science.159.3810.73.b
- Speaking and writing in medicine, the art of communication. Springfield, Illinois: Charles C. Thomas Publisher. 1967. pp. xiii+159.
- You and your guts. London: BMA. 1971.
- as editor with R. N. Allan, Michael R. B. Keighley, and J. Alexander-Williams: Inflammatory Bowel Diseases. Edinburgh: Churchill Livingstone. 1983. 2nd edition, 1990.
- as editor with Marco Sorgi: Research: how to plan, speak and write about it. Berlin; New York: Springer-Verlag. 1985. pp. viii+184. ISBN 0387139923; pbk; foreword by Stephen Lock
- with Elwyn Elias: Lecture notes on gastroenterology. Oxford: Blackwell Scientific. 1985.
- Alimentary, my dear Doctor. Oxford: Radcliffe Medical. 1988.
