= Crime Museum =

Collection of memorabilia in London

Coordinates: 51°30′10″N 0°7′27″W

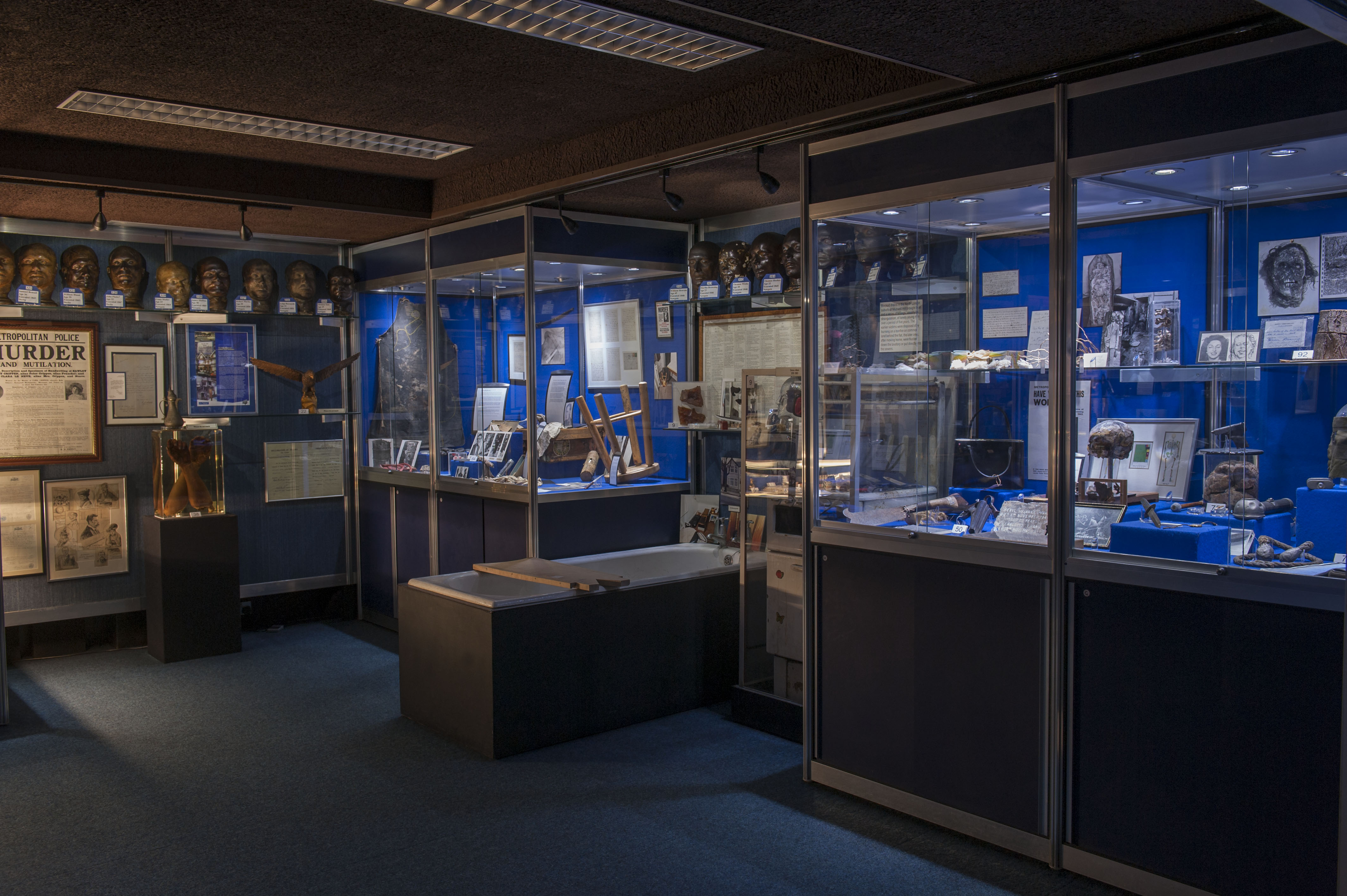
The Crime Museum in its former home at New Scotland Yard, 8–10 Broadway (now demolished)

The Crime Museum is a collection of criminal memorabilia kept at New Scotland Yard, headquarters of the Metropolitan Police Service in London, England. Known as the Black Museum until the early 21st century, the museum came into existence at Scotland Yard sometime in 1874, arising out of the collection of prisoners' property gathered as a result of the Forfeiture Act 1870 and intended as an aid to the police in their study of crime and criminals. Initially unofficial, it had become an official if private museum by 1875, with a police inspector and a police constable assigned to official duty there. Not open to the public, it was used as a teaching collection for police recruits and was only ever accessible by those involved in legal matters, royals and other VIPs.

Now sited in the basement of the Curtis Green Building (the present New Scotland Yard), the museum remains closed to the public but can be visited by officers of the Metropolitan Police and any of the country's police forces by prior appointment.

== History ==
=== Origins ===
In his 1993 book The Black Museum: New Scotland Yard, the museum's then-curator Bill Waddell asserted that its origins lay in an 1869 Act giving the police authority to either destroy items used in the commission of a crime or retain them for instructional purposes, when previous to that Act they had been retained by the police until reclaimed by their owners. No such Act was passed in 1869 and this misapprehension seems to originate in a misdated mention of the Forfeiture Act 1870 (Note: It abolished forfeiture of property for felony and treason, instead vesting that property's "custody and management" in an "administrator", who would then return it at the end of the prisoner's sentence.) in an 1877 newspaper report on the museum:

Formerly all property of any kind belonging to convicted felons went to the Crown, but by an Act passed, we believe, in 1869, this was altered, and whatever is found on them now is retained till their sentences have been completed, when they can come back to this house [i.e. the Museum] and claim their own. This law does not, of course, apply to cases of unlawful possession, such as tools for burglary, which are never given up, or see the light again.

The Black Museum was conceived in 1874 by Percy George Neame, a serving inspector who at that time had collected together a number of items, with the intention of giving police officers practical instruction on how to detect and prevent crime. The first exhibits for display were clothing and items belonging to Jane Clouson, 17, murdered in Eltham. By the latter part of 1874, official authority was given for a crime museum to be opened. Neame, with the help of a P.C. Randall, gathered together sufficient material of both old and new cases—initially pertaining to exhibits found in the possession of burglars and thieves—to enable a museum to be subsequently opened.

There was no official opening and the actual date in 1875 when the Black Museum opened is not known, but the permanent appointment of Neame and Randall to duty in the Prisoners Property Store on 12 April suggests that it may have come into being in the latter part of that year.

=== 1876-1902 ===
The Museum's first two years saw a steady increase in visitors, particularly by CID officers being instructed in the museum as part of their training, keeping it in constant use. However, no record of visitors was kept until 6 October 1877, when a group of dignitaries were shown round the collection by Commissioner Sir Edmund Henderson, KCB and Assistant Commissioners Lt. Col. Labalmondiere and Capt. Harris. They were the first entries in a visitors' book which ran until 1894 and—though not all visitors were asked to sign it—it contains many notable figures from the period. One reporter from The Observer newspaper was refused admittance by Inspector Neame and on 8 April 1877 that journalist coined the name 'Black Museum' for the collection.

In 1890 the museum moved with the Metropolitan Police Office to new premises at the other end of Whitehall, on the newly constructed Thames Embankment. The building, constructed by Norman Shaw RA, and made of granite quarried by convicts on Dartmoor, was called New Scotland Yard. A set of rooms in the basement housed the museum and, although there was no Curator as such, PC Randall was responsible for keeping the place tidy, adding to exhibits, vetting applications for visits and arranging dates for them. Inspector Percy Neame retired on 31 December 1901. In June 1902 he committed suicide "by blowing his brains out" when Chief Inspector Arthur Fair and another officer were at his front door, calling in respect of a "few things in his accounts which they could not understand with reference to money seized at gaming houses".

=== 1903-present ===
The museum was closed during both world wars and in 1967, when New Scotland Yard moved to new premises in Victoria Street, S.W.1, the museum moved into rooms on the building's second floor, which underwent several renovations.

During the refurbishment and extension of the Curtis Green Building and New Scotland Yard's move into it, a major exhibition of artefacts from the museum, The Crime Museum Uncovered, was held at the Museum of London from 9 October 2015 to 10 April 2016. Following the exhibition the museum reopened in 2018 in a "dark and dramatic" room in the basement of the Building designed by Allford Hall Monaghan Morris in collaboration with engineering consultancy Arup. From 10 June 2025 to 9 May 2026 the 150th anniversary of the Crime Museum was marked by a public exhibition in the gallery of the Metropolitan Police Museum in Sidcup, southeast London, with objects, photographs and archives from the Crime Museum collection on display.

== Collections ==
The museum displays more than 500 exhibits, each at a constant temperature of 17 °C (63 degrees Fahrenheit). These include historic collections and more recent artefacts, including a substantial collection of melee weapons (some overt, some concealed, all of which have been used in murders or serious assaults in London), shotguns disguised as umbrellas and numerous walking-stick swords. The museum also contains a selection of hangman's nooses, including that used to perform the UK's last-ever execution, and death masks made for criminals executed at Newgate Prison and acquired in 1902 on the prison's closure.

There are also displays from famous cases which include Charlie Peace's belongings and letters allegedly written by Jack the Ripper, though the infamous From Hell letter is not part of the collection. The more recent exhibits on display include the ricin-filled pellet that killed Bulgarian dissident Georgi Markov in 1978, a model of the possible umbrella that fired the pellet, the fake De Beers diamond from the Millennium Dome heist and Dennis Nilsen's actual stove and bathtub. Objects not currently on display include items that once belonged to Charles Black, the most prolific counterfeiter in the Western Hemisphere, including a set of printing plates, a remarkable series of forged banknotes, and a cunningly hollowed-out kitchen door once used to conceal them.

=== Cases on display (A–Z) ===
- Death of Keith Blakelock in the Broadwater Farm housing estate in 1985 (his uniform is displayed)
- The trunk from the Charing Cross Trunk Murder
- John Reginald Halliday Christie, a notorious English serial killer active in the 1940s and early 1950s.
- Three guns from the 1944 cleft chin murder case
- The poisons kit of Thomas Neill Cream, also known as the Lambeth Poisoner, a Scottish-born serial killer
- The revolver used by Ruth Ellis to murder her lover, David Blakely, along with the noose used to execute her (Note: She was the last woman to be executed in the United Kingdom, after being convicted of Blakely's murder.)
- The eponymous pieces of evidence from the February 1918 "Badge and Button Murder", also known as the Eltham Common murder
- John George Haigh, an English serial killer, active between 1944 and 1949
- Clothing and hair samples from the Harley Street Mystery
- A cast of the hole drilled into the vault wall during the Hatton Garden safe deposit burglary. (Note: During the long weekend of Easter Bank Holiday in April 2015, four thieves burgled deposit boxes with a value up to £200 million)

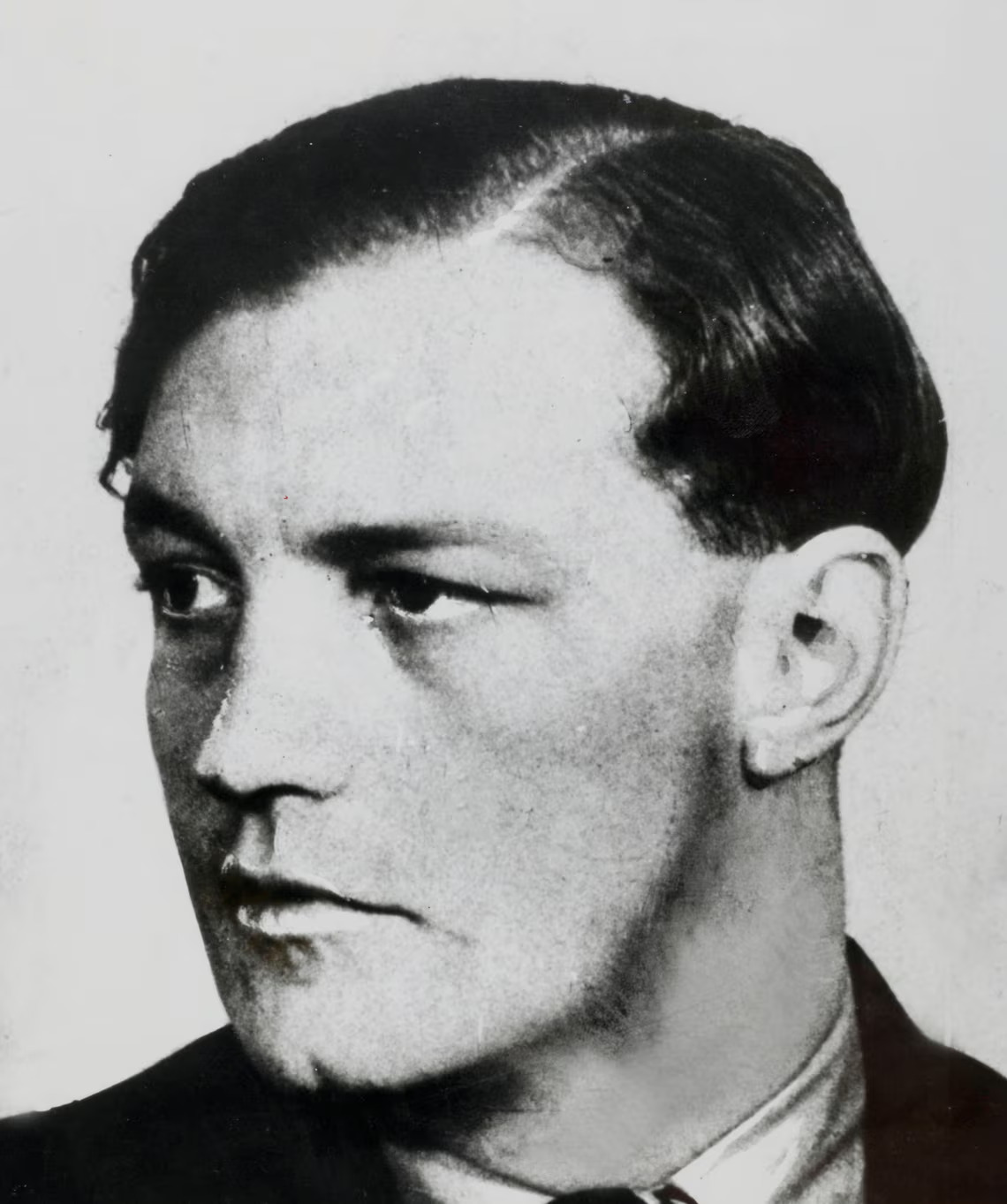
Neville Heath. Hanged for murder in 1946.

- Neville Heath, an English killer who was responsible for the murders of at least two young women, and who was executed in London in 1946
- Dennis Nilsen, a serial killer and necrophiliac. (Note: Also known as the Muswell Hill Murderer and the Kindly Killer, he committed the murders of 15 young men in London.)
- Weapons and other items from crimes against royalty, such as failed assassination attempts by Edward Oxford, George McMahon and Marcus Sarjeant and the attempted kidnapping of Princess Anne
- The pistol used by Udham Singh, an Indian revolutionary, to kill Michael O'Dwyer, the former Lieutenant Governor of the Punjab in British India.
- The Stratton Brothers, the first men to be convicted in Great Britain for murder based on fingerprint evidence

=== Loans ===
Though the 2015–2016 exhibition and 2025-2026 and 2026-2027 exhibitions at the Metropolitan Police Museum have been the only times a large number of exhibits have been displayed to the general public, individual objects have been loaned to exhibitions at other museums in 2019–2020. This included objects from Leatherslade Farm in a Great Train Robbery exhibition at the Postal Museum and a cigarette lighter with a hidden compartment from the Krogers in a GCHQ exhibition at the Science Museum, whilst exhibits from the trial of Roger Casement have been on loan to Kerry County Museum since 2016.

== In other media ==
In 1951 British commercial radio producer Harry Alan Towers produced a radio series hosted by Orson Welles called The Black Museum, inspired by the catalogue of items on display. Each week, the programme featured an item from the museum and a dramatization of the story surrounding the object to the macabre delight of audiences. Often mistakenly cited as a BBC production, Towers commercially syndicated the programme throughout the English-speaking world. The American radio writer Wyllis Cooper also wrote and directed a similar anthology for NBC that ran at the same time in the U. S. called Whitehall 1212, for the telephone number of Scotland Yard. The program debuted on 18 November 1951, and was hosted by Chief Superintendent John Davidson, curator of the Black Museum.

- There is a fictional Black Museum, inspired by the actual one, inside the Grand Hall of Justice in the Judge Dredd comic strip.
- A fictional version of the Black Museum is often referred to in the Dylan Dog comic series and, in some stories, exhibits are stolen from the museum.
- In the 1944 film The Lodger, Inspector Warwick (George Sanders) gives a tour of the museum to Kitty Langley (Merle Oberon).
- A 1958 horror film called Horrors of the Black Museum references the Black Museum in a story of a crime writer (played by Michael Gough) who commits grisly murders in order to write articles and books about them for public consumption.
- The fourth series of Charlie Brooker's Black Mirror has an episode called "Black Museum".
- Tony Parsons wrote about the Black Museum in his books about detective Max Wolfe.
- The manga series Kuro Hakubutsukan (Black Museum) takes place in the Crime Museum, during the period it was called Black Museum.
- The book series 'DCI Judas Iscariot and the Black Museum' by Martin Davey features a fictional version of the Black Museum where it is looked after by Judas Iscariot as the head of the occult department of the Metropolitan Police in London.
- Film trivia: Crime Museum founder Inspector Percy Neame's maternal nephew was Challis Sanderson a British Silent Film-era Director. Notably, among Sanderson's many collaborations with British screenwriter Eliot Stannard, in 1926-1927, the pair shared London 'writing digs' while Stannard created the screenplay for Alfred Hitchcock's film The Lodger: A Story of the London Fog. The film is based on the 1911 horror novel about a London serial killer, by Marie Adelaide Belloc Lowndes, The Lodger (novel), which drew on the real life Whitechapel Murders by Jack The Ripper.

== Cited works and further reading ==
- Honeycombe, Gordon (1982). The Murders of the Black Museum: 1870: 1970. Bloomsbury Books. ISBN 978-1-85471160-1.
- Waddell, Bill (1992). "Murder Casebook: Scotland Yard's Black Museum 1875 - 1992". Murder Casebook. Marshall Cavendish. ISBN 978-0-748-59926-4.
- Waddell, Bill (1993). The Black Museum: New Scotland Yard. Little, Brown and Company. ISBN 978-0-316-90332-5.
