= Wyllis Cooper =

American radio writer (1899–1955)

- Wyllis Cooper
- Born: Wyllis Oswald Cooper; January 26, 1899; Pekin, Illinois
- Died: June 22, 1955 (aged 56); High Bridge, New Jersey
- Occupation: Radio writer
- Notable work: Lights Out (1934–1947); Quiet, Please (1947–1949)

Wyllis Oswald Cooper (January 26, 1899 – June 22, 1955) was an American writer and producer.

He is best remembered for creating and writing the old time radio programs Lights Out (1934–1947) and Quiet, Please (1947–1949).

== Biography ==
Born Willis Oswald Cooper in Pekin, Illinois, he attended Pekin High School, graduating in 1916. He soon joined the U.S. Cavalry where, achieving the rank of Sergeant, he spent time on the Mexican border. In 1917, he became a part of the Signal Corps and was sent to France during World War I. While in France he was gassed at the Meuse-Argonne Offensive. He remained on active duty until 1919 when he left to become an advertising writer, though he maintained his reserve status.

By the late 1920s he was writing advertising copy in Chicago and entered radio, writing scripts for the 1929–1931 NBC radio program Empire Builders. He later worked as continuity editor of CBS Chicago and, in 1933, left to take the same position at NBC Chicago. In 1934, he created his best known dramatic series, a late night horror radio program called Lights Out, which he also directed. Airing at midnight, the program quickly earned a reputation for its gory deaths and sound effects.

The show would prove to be a long-term success, but in 1936, Cooper capitalized on the fame of Lights Out and resigned from NBC, moving to Hollywood, California, where he worked as a screenwriter for film studios. His screenplay for the 1939 film Son of Frankenstein introduced the much-parodied character of Ygor. He contributed to a few of the Mr. Moto films. At the same time, he continued to provide radio scripts for various series including Hollywood Hotel.

Arch Oboler, who took over the writing of Lights Out when Cooper left, would suggest that Cooper was the first person to create a unique form of radio drama, writing, "Radio drama (as distinguished from theatre plays boiled down to kilocycle size) began at midnight, in the middle thirties, on one of the upper NBC floors of Chicago's Merchandise Mart. The pappy was a rotund writer by the name of Willys (sic) Cooper."

By 1940, Cooper moved to New York City. Here he changed his name from “Willis” to “Wyllis” in order "to please his wife's numerological inclinations". He continued to make a living writing radio scripts for various network programs including The Campbell Playhouse, the sponsored successor of Orson Welles's Mercury Theatre.

During World War II, he was made a consultant to the Secretary of War and produced, directed and wrote a weekly news and variety propaganda series entitled The Army Hour.

In 1944, Cooper joined the radio department of New York's Compton Advertising, Inc. In 1947, he created what was arguably his finest radio effort, Quiet, Please. It began over the Mutual Broadcasting System network and later moved to ABC. He also wrote and directed a crime anthology for NBC entitled Whitehall 1212, which debuted on November 18, 1951. The series was hosted by Chief Superintendent John Davidson, fictional curator of the Black Museum at Scotland Yard. It featured an allegedly British cast and told stories inspired by artifacts held by the famous London crime museum. Cooper's show competed with a similar program hosted by Orson Welles which ran on Mutual in 1952.

As television became the dominant entertainment medium, Cooper experimented with various programs including Volume One, which he wrote and produced.

Cooper resided in Glen Gardner, New Jersey, and died in High Bridge, New Jersey, on June 22, 1955.
