= Michael Maybrick =

English composer and singer (1841–1913)

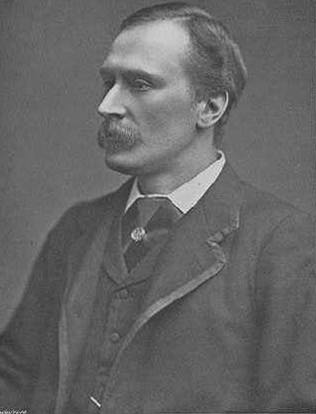
- Born: 31 January 1841; Liverpool, UK
- Died: 26 August 1913 (aged 72)
- Occupation: composer
- Relatives: James Maybrick (brother)

Michael Maybrick (31 January 1841 – 26 August 1913) was an English composer and singer, best known under his pseudonym Stephen Adams as the composer of "The Holy City", one of the most popular religious songs in English.

== Songs ==
- The Holy City
- A Warrior Bold

== Early life ==
Maybrick was born at 8 Church Alley, Liverpool, the fourth of the eight children of William Maybrick, an engraver and his wife, Susannah. Both his grandfather and father served as parish clerk at St Peter's, Liverpool, and were minor composers. His uncle Michael Maybrick was organist at St Peter's, wrote sacred music, and conducted the Liverpool Choral Society. Having become proficient on the piano by the age of eight, the young Maybrick studied the organ with W. T. Best and at the age of fifteen became organist of St Peter's; he also wrote anthems and had a work performed in London.

== Musical career ==
The Blue Alsatian Mountains by Michael Maybrick
The Blue Alsatian Mountains by Michael Maybrick

On the advice of his godfather, Alfred Mellon, in 1865 Maybrick went to Leipzig to study keyboard and harmony with Carl Reinecke, Ignaz Moscheles, and Louis Plaidy, but later decided to train as a baritone with Gaetano Nava in Milan. After gaining experience in Italian theatres, he appeared with great success in London on 25 February 1869 in Mendelssohn's Elijah. Further success came as Telramund in Wagner's Lohengrin led to appearances with Charlotte Sainton-Dolby, including her farewell concert on 6 June 1870, and to regular engagements at the English festivals and with the Carl Rosa Opera Company. He appeared as a baritone at all the leading concert venues in London and the provinces, as well as in English opera.

By the early 1870s, Maybrick was singing his own songs, beginning with "A Warrior Bold". Published under the pseudonym Stephen Adams and mostly with lyrics by Fred Weatherly, his songs achieved extraordinary popularity. His early sea song "Nancy Lee" sold more than 100,000 copies in two years. Maybrick penned other sea songs including "The Tar's Farewell", "They All Love Jack" and "The Midshipmite", sentimental songs such as "Your Dear Brown Eyes", romantic numbers like "The Children of the City", and sacred songs like "The Blue Alsatian Mountains", "The Star of Bethlehem", and the well-loved "The Holy City". In 1884 he toured New Zealand performing his own songs. His friends spoke of his charming personality, but others thought him arrogant and vain. He composed one of the earliest musical settings of A. E. Housman, 'When I was one-and-twenty' in 1904, the same year Arthur Somervell published his A Shropshire Lad song cycle.

== Retirement ==
Maybrick was a keen amateur sportsman, being a cricketer, a yachtsman and a cyclist, and a captain in the Artists Rifles. On 9 March 1893 he married his forty-year-old housekeeper, Laura Withers, and settled with her at Ryde on the Isle of Wight.

== Jack the Ripper allegations ==
In 1992, his brother James Maybrick was accused of being the notorious serial killer Jack the Ripper, based on the discovery of a diary which contained an account allegedly written by James Maybrick himself. However, in his book They All Love Jack, writer, researcher, and filmmaker Bruce Robinson alleged that Michael Maybrick himself was the Ripper. The book contends that the British establishment, police, and royal connections actively suppressed the truth because exposing a prominent Freemason (as Michael Maybrick was) would threaten the ruling class. While praised as an entertaining and furious piece of cultural history, traditional historians and reviewers treated Robinson’s conclusions and conspiracy framework with heavy skepticism.
