= Whitehall 1212 (radio show) =

Whitehall 1212 was a weekly crime drama radio show in the United States that ran from November 18, 1951 until September 28, 1952. Its cases were taken from the files of New Scotland Yard's Black Museum.

== History ==
Whitehall 1212, named after the then famous telephone number of New Scotland Yard—the headquarters of the London Metropolitan Police Force—was written and directed by Wyllis Cooper and broadcast by NBC. It was hosted by Chief Superintendent John Davidson, curator of the Black Museum and it used many of the same cases chosen for the contemporary radio show The Black Museum, and nearly mirrored its broadcast run. The two shows were different in the respect that while Whitehall 1212 told the story of a case entirely from the point of view of the police starting from the crime scene, The Black Museum was more heavily dramatized and played out scenes of the actual murders and included scenes from the criminal's point of view. in the weekly introduction Whitehall 1212 claimed that it 'for the first time in history Scotland Yard opens its secret files to bring you the authentic, true stories of some of its most baffling cases.' They also claimed that they were the 'unvarnished facts just as they occurred' but added that 'only the names of the participants have, for obvious reasons, been changed' They also announced that the cast was entirely British, stories were presented with the full cooperation of the Metropolitan Police, and that research was prepared by Percy Hoskins, chief crime reporter of the (London) Daily Express.

== Listen to ==
- Whitehall 1212 episodes on the Internet Archive
