= The Danish Girl (soundtrack) =

2015 soundtrack album by Alexandre Desplat

The Danish Girl (Original Motion Picture Soundtrack)

Soundtrack album by Alexandre Desplat
- Released: 27 November 2015
- Studio: AIR Studios; Abbey Road Studios
- Length: 59:05
- Label: Decca Records

The Danish Girl (Original Motion Picture Soundtrack) is the soundtrack album composed by Alexandre Desplat for the 2015 film The Danish Girl. It was released by Decca Records on 27 November 2015, the same day as the film's theatrical release in the United States.

== Production ==
In preparation to score The Danish Girl, composer Alexandre Desplat was given the film's script and did his own research on Lili Elbe and Gerda Wegener. Additionally, director Tom Hooper sent Desplat photos of Eddie Redmayne's transformation into Lili Elbe.

Finding the correct tone for his score proved to be challenging for Desplat. He didn't want the score to veer too dark or too simple; it had to be romantic, but also needed to convey something deeper than a simple love story in film. Desplat also didn't want to patronize or stereotype Lili Elbe with his score.

It took a long time to find the right tone. It was difficult to convey what Einar has inside his own self, which is [Lili], and how to bring it out. I knew we should feel an undercurrent of happiness, something that is irrepressible, that you can't stop, and to feel the emerging of [Lili]. But that was not so easy. The music had to mix something beautiful and moving, but with a little spice of anxiety and danger; it's tricky.

— Alexandre Desplat, on finding a direction for his score of The Danish Girl

Desplat had a breakthrough when he realized that the score had to emulate Lili through the eyes of Gerda. Thus, Desplat scored a duet that gave both characters a voice. With the help of his wife and artistic director, violinist Dominique Lemonnier, Desplat veered away from his usual "restrained and fragile” writing for strings, and instead captured a warmer sound that would emulate the love Gerda had for Lili.

As The Danish Girl had been invited to the 72nd Venice International Film Festival, the post-production process had to be expedited. The film was still being editedб as Desplat wrote his score, and the score underwent several last-minute changes and adjustments during this time. The soundtrack was recorded one week before the film's premiere at AIR Studios, and it was mixed and mastered at Abbey Road Studios.

== Legacy and accolades ==
In 2016, the soundtrack was nominated for the Golden Globe Award for Best Original Score and the Satellite Award for Best Original Score.

== Track listing ==
No.	Title	Length
1.	"The Danish Girl"	2:10
2.	"Lili's Dream"	5:23
3.	"Watching Ulla"	2:07
4.	"Gerda"	1:59
5.	"Make-up & Costume"	3:16
6.	"Watching"	3:28
7.	"The Mirror"	3:56
8.	"Einar Returns Home"	1:37
9.	"To Dresden"	2:22
10.	"Aggression"	3:36
11.	"Radiation"	2:22
12.	"Gerda In The Rain"	4:01
13.	"Fonnesbech"	1:43
14.	"Schizophrenia"	2:02
15.	"One Step At A Time"	3:57
16.	"Lost Blood"	2:16
17.	"Lili's Death"	4:44
18.	"Roses Of Picardy"	4:38
19.	"Danish Waltz 1"	1:49
20.	"Danish Waltz 2"	1:40
Total length:		59:05

== Personnel ==
Credits adapted from CD liner notes.

- Soundtrack album produced by – Dominique Solrey Lemonnier and Alexandre Desplat
- Mastered by – Simon Gibson

All tracks except Track 18

- Composed by – Alexandre Desplat
- Performed by – London Symphony Orchestra
- Orchestra leader – Carmine Lauri
- Piano – Dave Arch
- Score producer – Dominique Solrey Lemonnier
- Recorded by – Peter Cobbin
- Mixed by – Peter Cobbin and Kirsty Whalley
- Assistant engineers – Adam Miller, Laurence Anslow, and Toby Hulbert
- Music editors – Lewis Morison, Michael Pärt, Rael Jones, and Peter Clarke
- Orchestrations – Alexandre Desplat, Jean-Pascal Beintus, Sylvain Morizet, and Nicolas Charron
- CD sequencing and editing – Xavier Forcioli
- Executive in charge of music for Universal Pictures – Mike Knobloch
- Publisher – UPG Music Publishing (BMI)

Track 18: Roses of Picardy

- Written by – Haydn Wood and Fred E. Weatherly
- Arranged by – Marie-Christine "Kiki" Desplat
- Performed by – Certains L'aiment Chaud
- Cornet – Marie-Christine "Kiki" Desplat
- Clarinet – Sylvette Claudet
- Piano – Agnès Loustau
- Banjo – Nathalie Renault
- Sousaphone – Claude Jeantet
- Publisher – Warner Chappell
