= Peter Dawson (bass-baritone) =

Australian bass-baritone and songwriter (1882–1961)

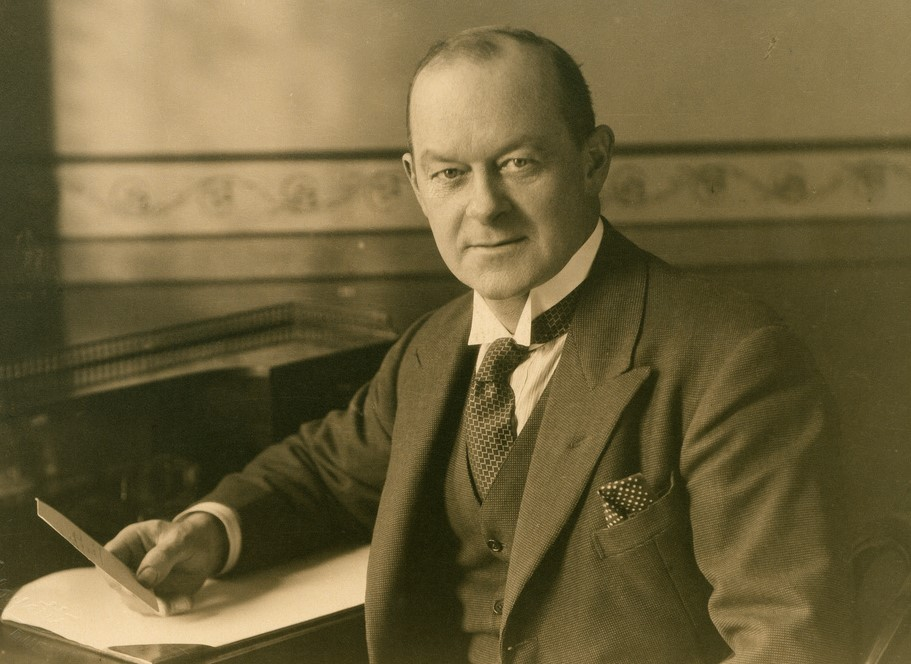

Background information
- Also known as: J. P. McCall, Will Strong, Will Danby, Hector Grant, Arthur Walpole, Robert Woodville, Evelyn Byrd, Peter Allison, Denton Toms, Charles Weber, Arnold Flint, Gilbert Mundy, Geoffrey Baxter, Alison Miller
- Born: Peter Smith Dawson; 31 January 1882; Adelaide, South Australia, Australia
- Died: 27 September 1961 (aged 79) Sydney, New South Wales, Australia
- Genres: Opera, oratorio, song
- Occupations: bass-baritone singer, songwriter
- Years active: 1899–1950s

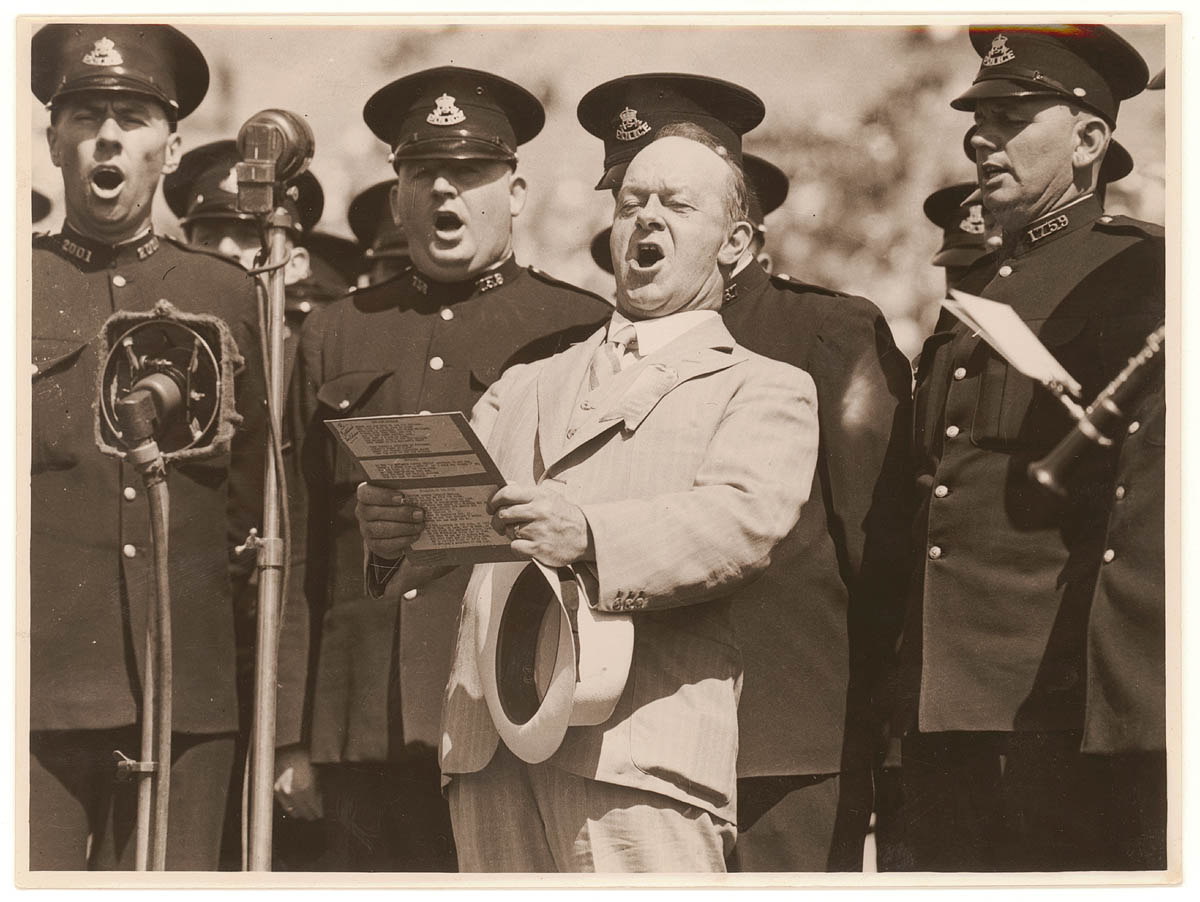
Peter Dawson singing with New South Wales police in the 1930s

Peter Smith Dawson (31 January 1882 – 27 September 1961) was an Australian bass-baritone and songwriter in the 1920s and 1930s, when he was possibly the most popular singer of that era. He said that at the time the gramophone was "an instrument of torture", excruciating for the recording artist, who needed "lungs of leather" to make an impression on the wax cylinders, which captured nothing but the very loudest noises.

However, Dawson made his first recording in 1904, and continued to release songs for EMI and His Master's Voice (HMV) until 1958. In this time he performed classical tunes such as Tchaikovsky's "Don Juan Serenade" and popular songs like "Waltzing Matilda".

He was the subject of a biography, Peter Dawson: The World's Most Popular Baritone written by Peter Burgis and Russell Smith. That biography estimates Dawson had in excess of 1500 recordings issued during his career.

In 1984, he was chosen by the Guinness Book of Recorded Sound as one of the top ten singers of all time, alongside Elvis Presley and Enrico Caruso.

== Early career ==
Peter Dawson was born in 1882 in Adelaide, South Australia, to immigrant Scottish parents, Thomas Dawson, an ironworker, plumber and seaman from Kirkcaldy and Alison, née Miller. The youngest of nine children, he attended East Adelaide Primary School, then Pulteney Street School. At the age of 17, he joined a church choir and received singing lessons from C. J. Stevens. Then, aged 19, he won a prize for the best bass solo in a South Street Society competition at Ballarat, Victoria, and began taking up concert engagements. He was a featured singer at the 1901 Christmas performance of Messiah at the Adelaide Town Hall.

He was sent to London to be taught by Sir Charles Santley, who first sent him to F. L. Bamford of Glasgow for six months' basic training and coaching in vocal exercises, arias, oratorio pieces and classical songs. He then studied from 1903 to 1907 with Santley, who gave him a thorough training in voice production and a meticulous understanding of the great oratorios, especially Handel's Messiah, Mendelssohn's Elijah and Haydn's The Creation. In 1904, he joined Santley on an eight-week concert tour of the West of England with the soprano Emma Albani.

He attended a large number of performances at Covent Garden during the first decade of the 20th century and heard many of the leading lower-voiced male singers of the age, including the baritones Titta Ruffo, Pasquale Amato, Mattia Battistini, Mario Sammarco and the basses Marcel Journet, Édouard de Reszke and Pol Plançon. Throughout his life he acknowledged the "bel canto" example of Battistini. In addition to Italian and French opera, he grew to admire the German music dramas of Richard Wagner.

On 20 May 1905, he married Annie Mortimer "Nan" Noble, daughter of the box-office manager of the Alhambra Theatre, who sang professionally in the soprano range under the name Annette George. Around this time, a Russian medical specialist assisted him to extend his upper range, until his compass extended from E-flat in the bass to a high A or A-flat. In 1909, he appeared at the Royal Opera House, Covent Garden, as the Night Watchman in The Mastersingers of Nuremberg (opposite tenor Walter Hyde as David), with Hans Richter conducting. During one of these performances, after winning a large amount playing poker in the wings, he hurried on at his call, and accidentally scattered his winnings over the stage. (Dawson, who had a lively sense of humour, was a master at recounting such anecdotes, usually about other performers.) However, he did not find the pressures of the opera stage to be a congenial fit with his easygoing personality, and he elected instead to forge an alternative career as a concert and oratorio singer.

== The concert platform ==
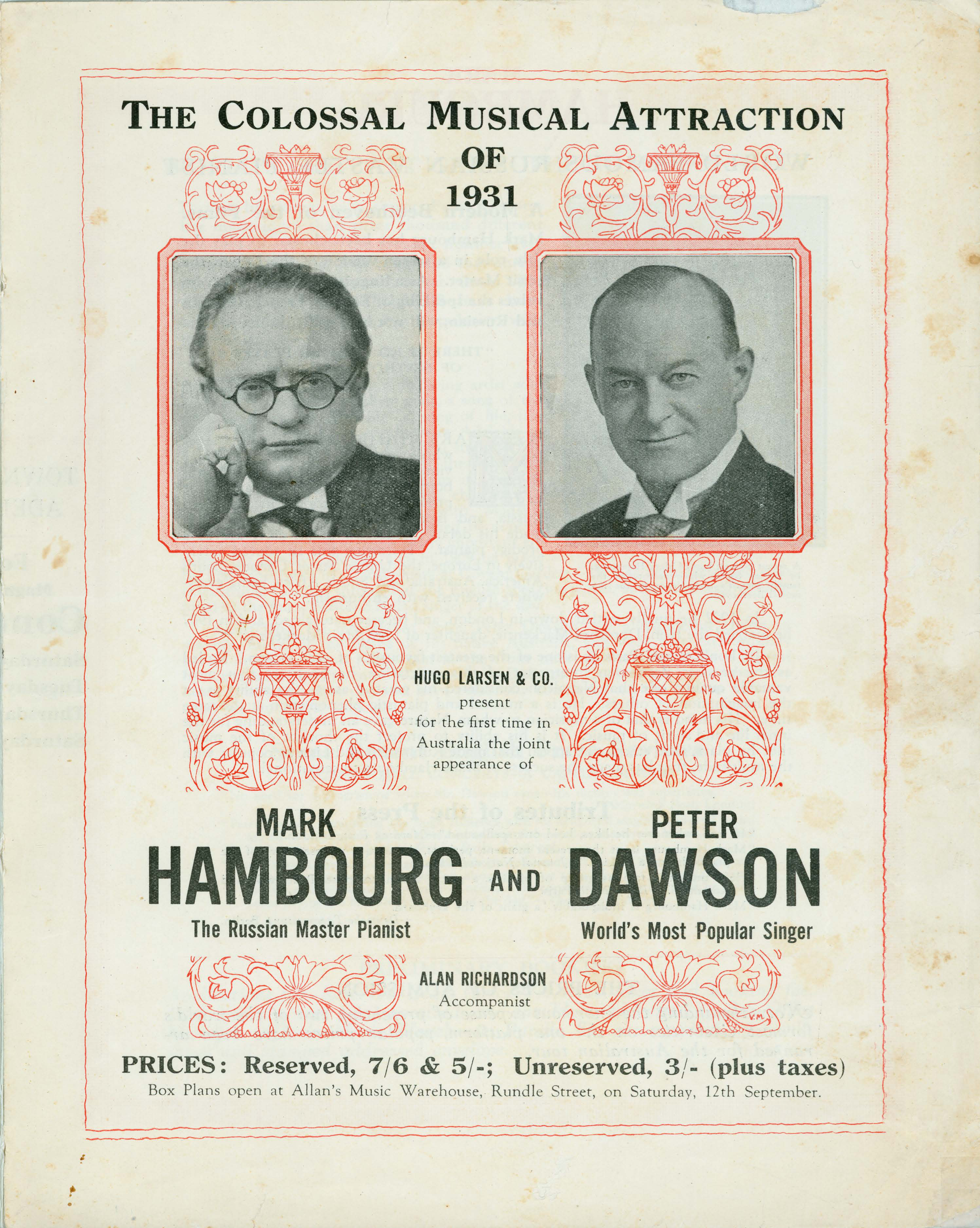
Cover of the program for Dawson's 1931 concert in Adelaide with pianist Mark Hambourg

Dawson was approached to appear in an important concert in London at the Queen's Hall; but first (in 1909–1910) he made a successful six-month tour of Australia with the Amy Castles company of singers. On his return, he began appearing in Promenade Concerts. A second long tour with his own company in Australia and New Zealand ended with the outbreak of war in Europe in 1914. He returned via South Africa to England, where he made concert appearances for wartime charities and the troops, but later decided to go back to Australia to enlist in the Australian Army as a private. However, the Armistice of 1918 intervened before he saw frontline service.

After the war and with another South African tour under his belt, Dawson returned to England. His voice was now entering its peak phase. A British tour ensued with International Celebrity Concerts, involving recitals of operatic numbers. Accompanied on the piano by Gerald Moore, he then gave lieder recitals at the Wigmore Hall in 1924. An extensive Australian tour (his sixth) occurred in 1931, and he paid further visits to his homeland in 1933, 1935, early 1939 and 1948–49. He made an extensive singing tour of India, Burma and the Straits Settlements during the 1930s; he also visited Ireland. His first BBC radio broadcast was made in 1931 and included lieder by Franz Schubert and Johannes Brahms; he subsequently became a prolific broadcaster, and was still active "on air" as late as the 1950s.

He was in Australia at the outbreak of World War II. Too old (at 57) to enlist, he contributed to the war effort as director of the family firm of Thomas Dawson & Sons, which was producing tins for military use, and by broadcasting and recording songs as well as touring army camps with concert parties.

His last public performance was a concert for the Australian Broadcasting Commission in his home town of Adelaide, in January 1961. He died of heart failure in Sydney in September of that year and was buried in Rookwood Cemetery.

== Dawson and the gramophone ==
"When the foeman bares his steel"
From The Pirates of Penzance, recorded 1920, with Dawson as the Sergeant

The gramophone was a major factor in the promotion and progression of Dawson's career. He made his first acoustic recording "Navahoe" for Edison-Bell on wax cylinders in 1904. More recordings for Edison and other companies followed. After a few experimental run-throughs, record producer Fred Gaisberg signed Dawson to an exclusive contract to cut discs for the Gramophone Company (the predecessor of HMV/EMI) in 1906; he continued, however, to record on cylinders for Edison until that company closed its London studios not long before World War I erupted. Dawson's standard repertoire rapidly became a mainstay of the HMV catalogue. In addition to the HMV titles appearing under his own name, he recorded Scottish songs popularised by Harry Lauder under the pseudonym Hector Grant, for the sister Zonophone record label.

In 1906, Dawson participated in the first series of partially complete Gilbert and Sullivan opera recordings, together with other studio recording artists. Beginning in 1919, he took part in an extensive series of musically complete recordings of Gilbert and Sullivan operettas with members of the D'Oyly Carte Opera Company, under the supervision of Rupert D'Oyly Carte, and conducted by HMV staff conductor George W. Byng. By 1920 he is said to have achieved total record sales of five million discs. After the First World War, audio technology was improving, and he recut many of his more popular titles during the early 1920s. With the introduction of electrical microphone recording in 1925, the core body of his work was committed once again to disc, including new Gilbert and Sullivan versions under Sir Malcolm Sargent. Dawson's electrical recordings from the late 1920s and early 1930s had the longest shelf-life, and most households owned at least one (according to author Brian Rust, writing in 1979). By the Second World War, his record sales had topped the 12 million mark.

In 1955, he visited the recording studios for the last time where, in experimental stereo, he recorded tracks with the London Symphony Orchestra conducted by Charles Mackerras. These included a moving rendition of Albert Arlen's setting of "Clancy of the Overflow" (to the poem of Banjo Paterson). The achievement is all the more remarkable when it is remembered that at this time Dawson was 73 years old and had had a career of some fifty years.

== Repertoire ==
Dawson's repertoire was essentially adapted to the purposes of the recital platform, growing out of the late 19th-century tradition of the smoking concerts and Chappell Recitals. He was an advocate of singing in English, and ensured that his diction was of the utmost clarity when he sang.

He owed to his vocal mentor Charles Santley a taste and technique perfectly suited to oratorio, of which Handel's Messiah was his favourite work. Handel standards ("O Ruddier than the Cherry"; "Why do the Nations?"; "Honour and Arms"; "Arm, arm ye Brave" and "Droop not Young Lover") and Mendelssohn ("I am a Roamer" from the Singspiel, Son and Stranger, and "It is Enough", from Elijah) remained constantly in his work. He sang Elgar roles, too, including "Oh My Warriors" and "The Sword Song" ("Leap, Leap, to the Light") from Caractacus. His concert operatic titles were principally the prologue from Pagliacci, "Iago's Credo" (Otello), "Even Bravest Heart" (Faust) – written originally by Gounod for Santley – "Largo al Factotum" (The Barber of Seville), "Non più andrai" (The Marriage of Figaro), "O Star of Eve" (Tannhäuser), the "Toreador Song" (Carmen), "Pari siamo" (Rigoletto) and "Within This Hallowed Dwelling" (The Magic Flute).

The art of the German Lied attracted him also, notably Schubert's "Erlkönig", "Ave Maria", "Who is Sylvia", "Sei mir gegrüßt", "Erstarrung", "Wasserflut", "Die Krähe" and "Ungeduld"; Schumann's "Die beiden Grenadiere", "Frühlingsnacht"; Carl Loewe's "The Clock", "Edward"; Brahms's "Die Mainacht", "Botschaft", "Ständchen", "Der Tod, der ist die kühle Nacht", "Blinde Kuh"; Richard Strauss's "Traum durch die Dämmerung" and Hugo Wolf's "Nun wandre Maria", "Verschwiegene Liebe". Russian standards also appeared in his recital programs, notably Tchaikovsky's "To the Forest", "None but the Lonely Heart", "Don Juan's Serenade", Rachmaninoff's "Christ is Risen" and Malashkin's "O Could I But Express in Song". Most of these songs were sung in English.

However, it was in British song that Dawson was especially famous, and his career helped to preserve the concert recital, and many of the older ballad type of songs, at a time when other forms of popular music were displacing the Victorian standards. He was particularly successful with the heartier, rollicking type of song, such as "Off to Philadelphia", "The Old Superb" and "Up from Somerset". He sang compositions by Stanford, Arthur Somervell, Arthur Sullivan, and some items by contemporary composers such as Percy French, Peter Warlock, Liza Lehmann, Granville Bantock, Eric Coates, Roger Quilter, Thomas Dunhill, Edward German, George Butterworth, Gustav Holst, Landon Ronald, Michael Head, Frank Bridge, Arnold Bax.

Many songs became personally identified with him, including "The Floral Dance" (Katie Moss), "The Kerry Dance" (Molloy), "The Bandolero" (Stuart), "The Cobbler's Song" (from Chu Chin Chow), "In a Monastery Garden" and "In a Persian Market" (Albert Ketèlbey), "The Lute Player" (Allitsen), "The Old Brigade", and "On the Road to Mandalay" (both Hedgcock and Speaks versions). His performance of the "Four Indian Love Lyrics" (Amy Woodforde-Finden) and his "Roses of Picardy" (Haydn Wood) were famous. He composed a number of songs himself, under the name J. P. McCall, most famously his setting of Rudyard Kipling's "Boots", which won the author's approval and was one of Dawson's greatest successes.

His recitals were also enlivened by the inclusion of many Australian songs, notably "Waltzing Matilda", "The Song of Australia", "Clancy of the Overflow" and "The Riveter" (Albert Arlen's settings), Six Australian Bush Songs, and also Alfred Hill's version of the New Zealand Māori song "Waiata poi".

== Awards ==
=== ARIA Music Awards ===
The ARIA Music Awards is an annual awards ceremony that recognises excellence, innovation, and achievement across all genres of Australian music. They commenced in 1987. Dawson was inducted into the Hall of Fame in 1991.

=== Recognition ===
In 2007, his 1931 recording of the song "Along the Road to Gundagai" was added to the National Film and Sound Archive's Sounds of Australia registry.

In 1984, Dawson was chosen by the Guinness Book of Recorded Sound as one of the top 10 singers on disc of all time, listed alongside Elvis Presley and operatic tenor Enrico Caruso.
