= Smallcombe Cemetery =

Cemetery in Bath, Somerset, United Kingdom

Coordinates: 51.3758°N 2.3431°W

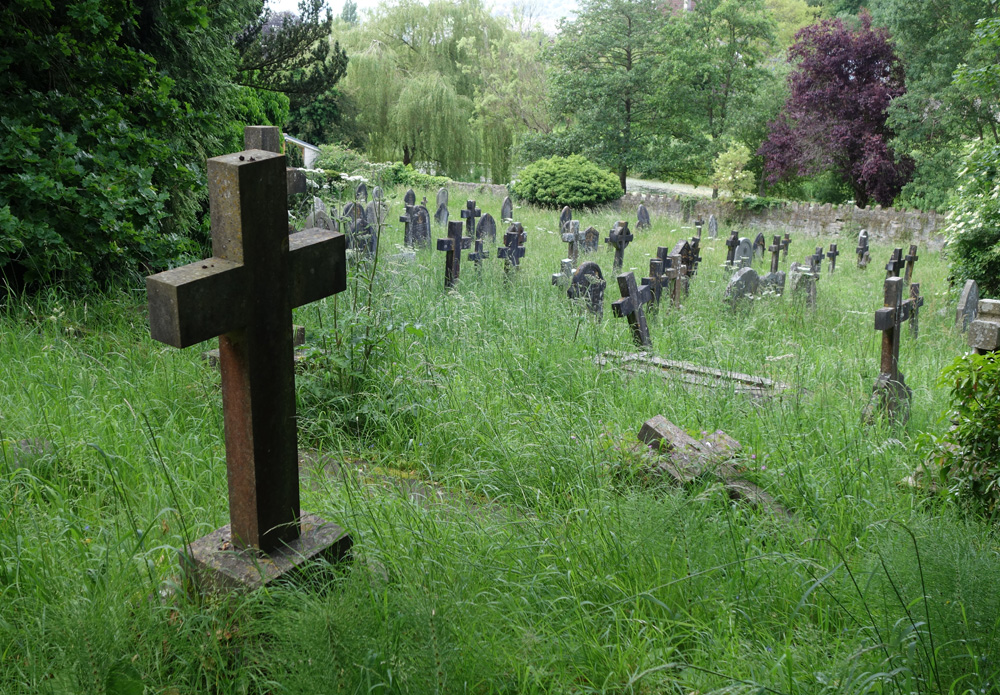
Part of the cemetery grounds

Smallcombe Cemetery is on the edge of Bath, Somerset, England, in a valley between Widcombe Hill and Bathwick Hill. It has two distinct parts, the Anglican section known as St Mary's Churchyard and the nonconformist section known as Smallcombe Vale cemetery; they are sometimes known together as Smallcombe Garden cemetery. The two cemeteries have been closed to new burials since 1988 and are maintained by Bath and North East Somerset Council. The Bath Corporation had assumed responsibility for both cemeteries in 1947.

== St Mary the Virgin churchyard ==
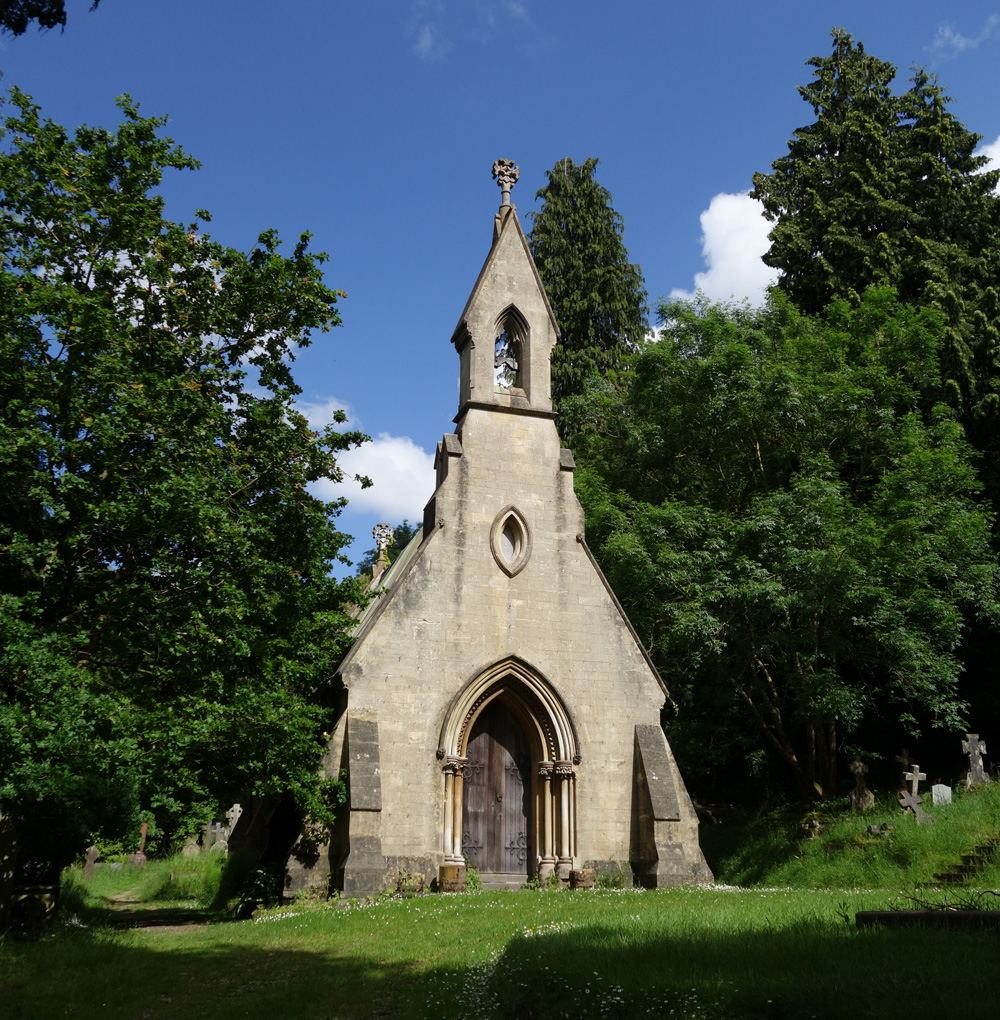
Smallcombe Anglican Mortuary Chapel

This churchyard is at the end of a private road leading from Horseshoe Lane, Bathwick. The Duke of Cleveland released the land at the southern end of Sydney Buildings for the St Mary the Virgin Churchyard which replaced the previous churchyard situated on the corner of Bathwick Street and Henrietta Road which had been closed in 1825.

Thomas Fuller (1823–1898) was employed as the architect with George Mann as the builder of the Anglican Mortuary Chapel. It was Grade II listed 2008. The corner stone of the Chapel was laid on 9 May 1855 and the consecrated ground opened for burials in 1856. The consecration of the land by the Bishop of Bath and Wells took place on 15 Feb 1856 and this was reported in the Bath & Cheltenham Gazette of 20 February 1856. In 1907 the original St Mary the Virgin Churchyard was extended by a further six sections.

The Mortuary Chapel was made redundant in 1992 and was sold by the Church authorities at auction in 2007 for £70,000. It has lain derelict since that time.

The churchyard contains four Commonwealth war graves of the First World War:

- Second Lieutenant Charles Edward Hoare Halls, Wiltshire Regiment (1917)
- Sergeant George Collins, North Somerset Yeomanry (1918)
- Flight Cadet John Francis Fox, RAF (1918)
- Admiral of the Fleet Sir George Astley Callaghan, RN (1920)

== Smallcombe Vale Cemetery ==
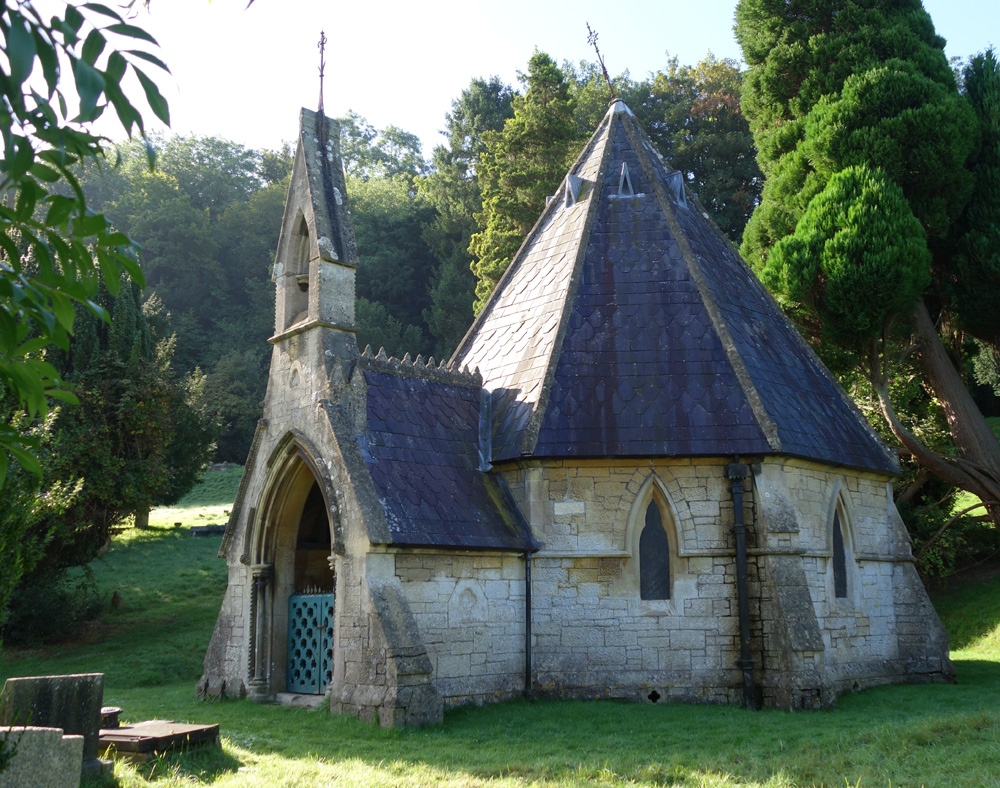
The nonconformist Smallcombe Vale Chapel, designed by Alfred S Goodridge

The Smallcombe Vale cemetery opened in 1861 or 1862 and was administered by the Bathwick Burial Board. The nonconformist Smallcombe Vale Chapel was designed by Alfred S Goodridge, and was Grade II listed in 2011.

== Notable burials and monuments ==
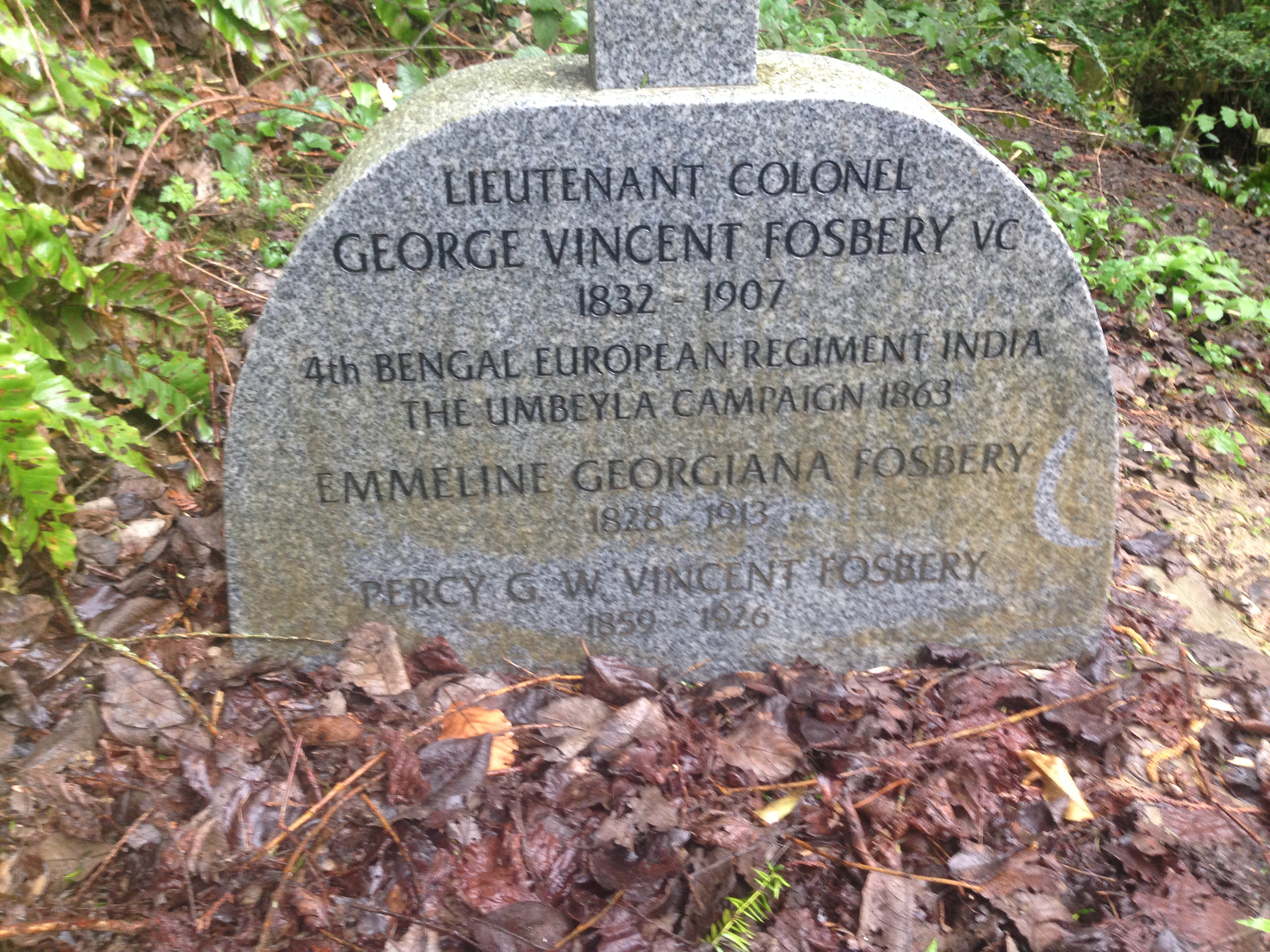
George Fosbery's grave

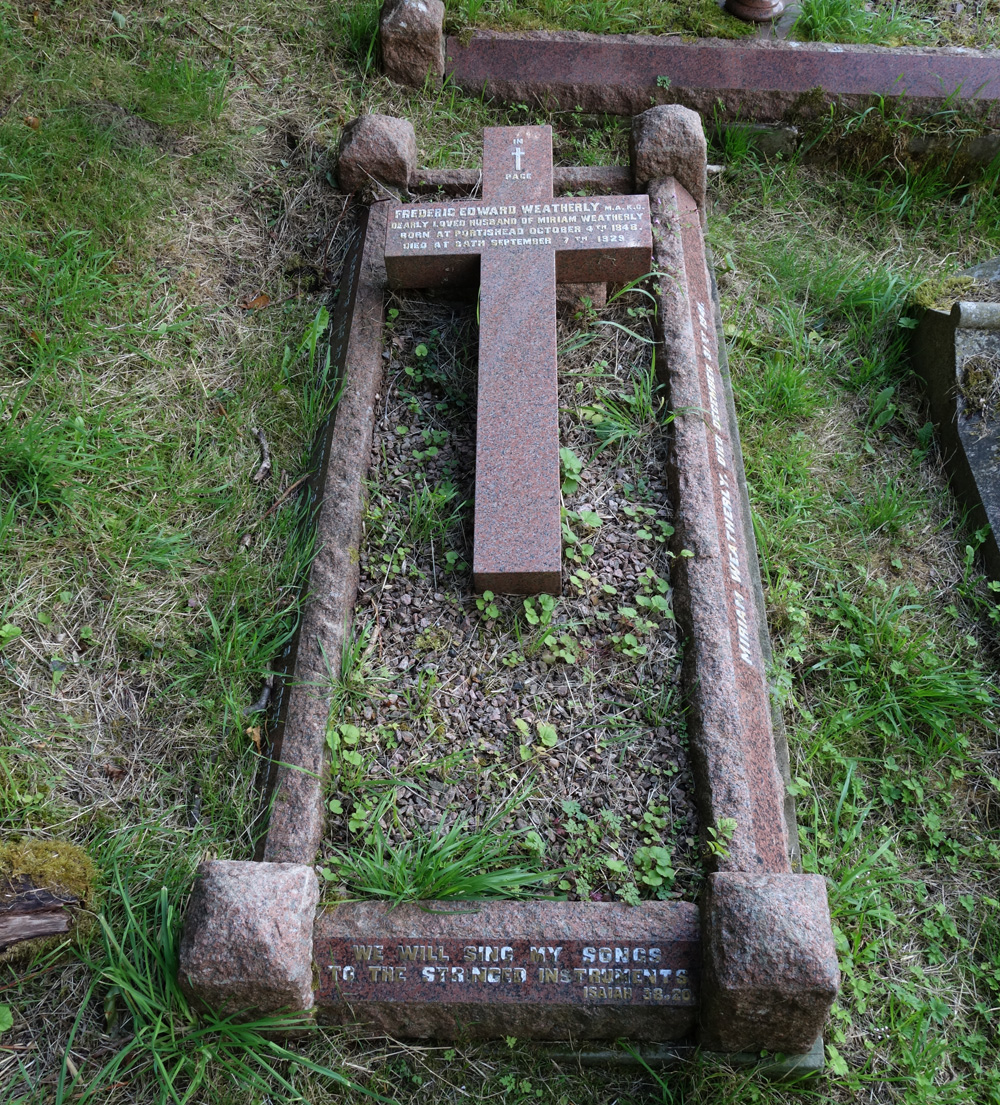
Frederic Weatherly's grave

Smallcombe Cemetery contains the graves of a number of notable people, including:

- Frederic Weatherly, composer of Danny Boy and Roses of Picardy amongst many other well-known songs;
- the parents of the poet A. E. Housman and their seven children. The Housman memorial was restored by the Housman Society in 2003.
- Wallace Gill, architect and the son of the architect John Elkington Gill.
- Two Victoria Cross holders:
  - George Fosbery, Lieutenant, 4th Bengal Regiment, Indian Army, for valiant leadership in recapturing the Crag picket, Umbeyla Expedition, North West Frontier, India, 30 October 1863
  - Henry Raby, Commander, Royal Navy, for heroism during the assault on the Redan, Sebastopol, Crimean War 18 June 1855. Raby is not buried at the cemetery, but he is commemorated on his wife's grave here.
- Two Commonwealth war graves of the First World War:
  - Petty Officer 1st Class S.I. Bailey, 104737, RNHMS Victory (1915)
  - Private William Ernest Fey, 10th Bn Devonshire Regiment (1915).

Other servicemen include Malby Edward Crofton, Captain and Adjutant, 2/4th Regiment who fought in the Zulu Wars.

The Hancock memorial which was erected around 1863, Rockshute Tomb of 1873, Pocock headstone from 1924 and an unknown memorial from around 1880 have been designated as listed buildings.

A full list of burials was prepared by Philip Bendall and is housed in the Bath Record Office. The Sydney Buildings History Group with the Bathwick History Society have extracted names of residents of Sydney Buildings. It has identified approximately 3,000 plots spread over 16 sections: A to K, with I not being allocated, in the St Mary the Virgin cemetery and 5 sections, V to Z, in Smallcombe Vale. Sections V, W and Z being the nonconformist plots in Smallcombe Vale, divided from the adjacent sections by a line of stones.

== Maintenance and restoration ==
Bath and North East Somerset Council maintains the grounds. The maintenance regime is to cut the churchyard fortnightly (weather permitting). All pruning, hedge cutting, etc., is carried out as winter works after the grass cutting season has ended. The council's arboricultural office keeps the trees under a three-yearly review and all major tree works are carried out by the council's tree specialists. The Bereavement Services department carries out a five-year rolling programme of memorial testing to ensure that memorials are preserved as well as possible and are safe. Memorials in danger of collapse are laid down.

The Friends of St Mary's Churchyards have been working with the city council to support efforts to maintain the grounds to maintain biodiversity and to improve the general environment. The Smallcombe Garden Cemetery Project was launched by the Friends to prepare a bid for Heritage Lottery Funds to assist with the cost of preservation of Smallcombe Cemetery and to establish a longer term public amenity role for the 'closed' cemetery, which is compatible with, and respects, its primary function of being a peaceful sanctuary for the deceased. The £75,000 project was completed in 2017 and included a new footpath which provides a link to National Trust land and the popular Bath Skyline trail.

== Flora and fauna ==
In common with many old cemeteries and graveyards, Smallcombe has a large community of flora and fauna within its environs. The Bath Natural History Society conducted a survey in 2013 and identified a significant number of species.
