= Odoardo Barri =

Odoardo Barri (13 September 1844 – 21 January 1920) was the pseudonym of Edward Slater. He was born in Dublin and became a composer, music teacher and singer in Italy and Spain. After working in Italy and Spain, he opened the Odoardo Barri School of Voice Culture in London in 1882, and ran it until his death. Several noted singers studied under Barri and some went on to teach, e.g. John Trew Gray, who taught in Toronto and San Diego.

Barri performed widely and over many years in England, Scotland and Northern Ireland, e.g. at Hastings on the pier; in City Hall, Glasgow; Surrey Masonic Hall; Trowbridge, Bloomsbury and Belfast, either alone or with his wife.

Barri's most notable composition was "The Old Brigade" with words by Frederic Weatherly; the copyright for the work was sold in 1899 for £357. His other works include a Mass for the King of Spain and many songs, including "The Shadow of the Cross", "Saved From the Storm", "The Good Shepherd", "The Armourer’s Gift" and "Birdie’s Nest". He also wrote three operettas, "M.D." (1879), "Our Amateur Theatricals" (1894) and "That Terrible Turk" (1898). A list of 656 of Barri's songs and other works is available online. Barri also worked as a theatre manager.

== Personal life ==
Odoardo Barri, who claimed to have been born in Como and that he had fought at Solferino, married Fanny Hayward on 21 October 1875 at the register office in St George Hanover Square, an event which the National Archives describes as “very unusual” for the time. He styled himself “Edward Barri”, son of George Frederic Barri, said to be in the Italian Army. He gave his address as New Bond Street, but there is no other evidence to support that.

Fanny gave her father’s name as Joachim Hayward (deceased). His true name was Joachim Hayward Stocqueler, and he was very much alive. Fanny was in fact Fanny Stocqueler, who was aged 28 and not 24, as stated on the marriage certificate. Neither was she a spinster, as stated, but had married and divorced William H Gibbons Post in America. The witnesses to the London marriage were the bride’s mother and her husband, the disgraced lawyer Edwin James. Fanny was a vocalist whose career began in America under the names of both Stocqueler and Hayward. She returned to England in July 1875 and started singing as Mlle Fanchita. It is not known what became of her.

Barri’s second wife was Mary Catherine (Kate) Stainer, who was aged 27 when they married in Marylebone in 1900; Barri was 56. Kate was an opera singer who performed under the stage name of Madame Maud Santley. She was born in Ryde on the Isle of Wight and, after training in Ryde, London and Paris, sung at Covent Garden, appearing with Caruso, Luisa Tetrazzini and Melba. Mary Catherine Barri died on 7 July1952 and was buried at Ryde Cemetery.

Odoardo Barri was a Freemason in the Pimlico Lodge, from 1882-85. He described himself as Prof. of Music, living at 60 Margaret Street, London. He died at 5 Fitzroy Street on 21 January 1920. An obituary in the Kensington Post suggests that Barrie had a rather colourful international life in his early career.
