= George Fosbery =

Recipient of the Victoria Cross

George Vincent Fosbery
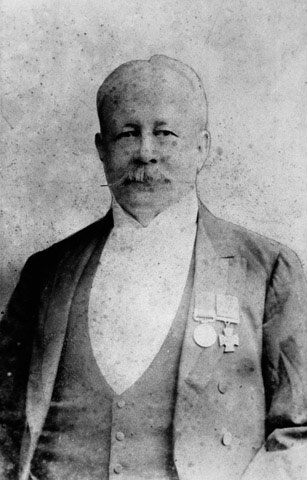
- Born: 11 April 1832; Stert, Wiltshire
- Died: 8 May 1907 (aged 75); Bath, Bath and North East Somerset
- Burial place: St Mary's Cemetery, Bath
- Military career
- Allegiance: United Kingdom
- Branch: British Indian Army
- Service years: 1852–1877
- Rank: Lieutenant Colonel
- Unit: 4th Bengal European Regiment
- Conflicts: Umbeyla Campaign
- Awards: Victoria Cross
- Other work: Firearms designer and inventor

Lieutenant Colonel George Vincent Fosbery VC (11 April 1832 – 8 May 1907) was an English recipient of the Victoria Cross, the highest and most prestigious award for gallantry in the face of the enemy that can be awarded to British and Commonwealth forces. He was also a designer and inventor of firearms.

== Military background ==
An Old Etonian, Fosbery was 31 years old, and a lieutenant in the 4th Bengal European Regiment, British Indian Army during the Umbeyla Campaign during which he was awarded the Victoria Cross. He retired from the service in 1877 having achieved the rank of lieutenant colonel.

=== Umbeyla Campaign ===
On 30 October 1863 during the Umbeyla Campaign, North-West India, Lieutenant Fosbery led a party of his regiment to recapture the Crag Picquet, after its garrison had been driven in by the enemy and 60 of them killed. The approach to the Crag was very narrow but the lieutenant led his party with great coolness, and was the first man to gain the top of the Crag from his side of the attack. Subsequently, when the commanding officer was wounded, Lieutenant Fosbery assembled a party and pursued the routed enemy, inflicting on them further losses.

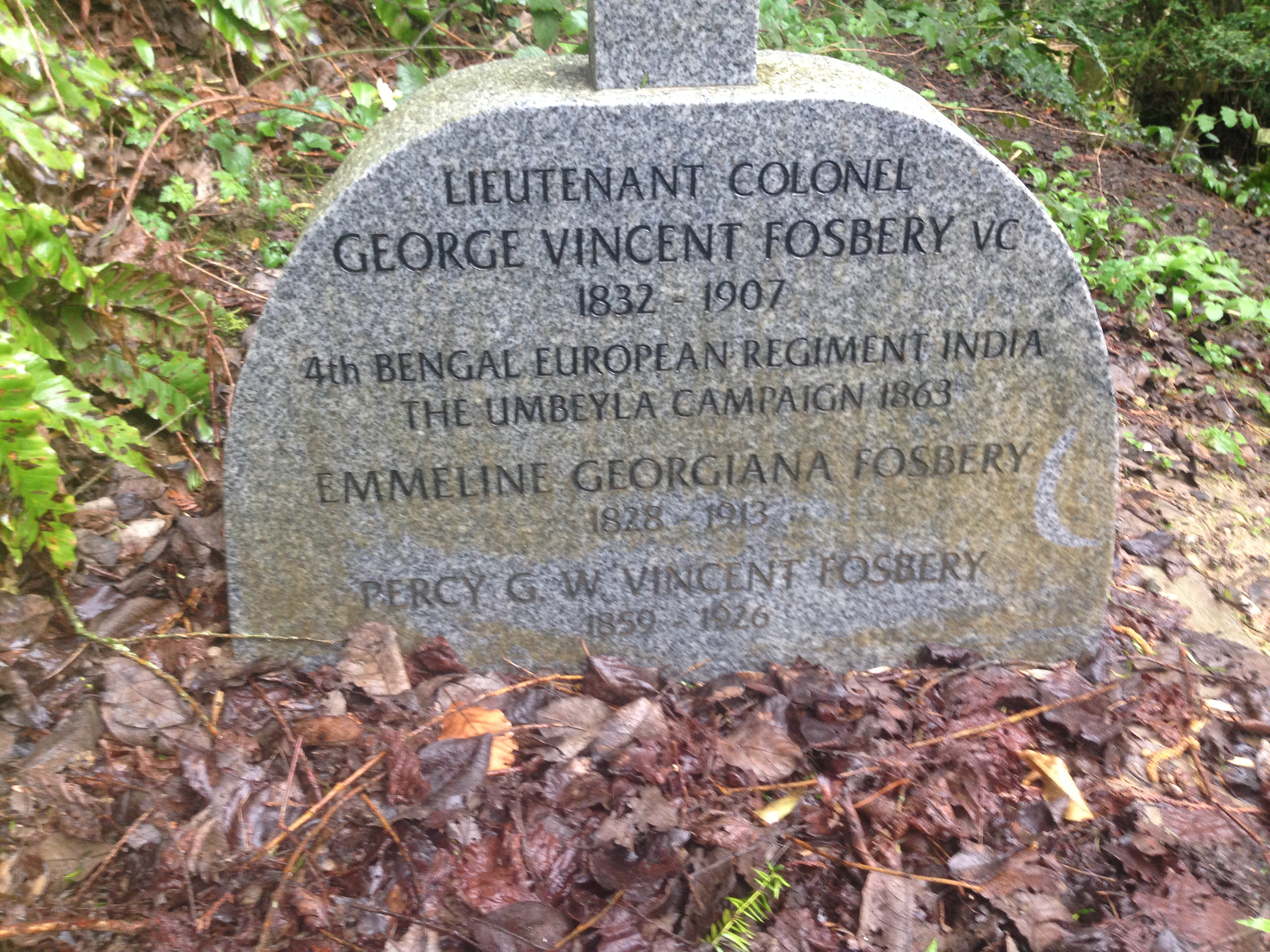
Fosbery's grave, Smallcombe Cemetery, Bath

== Inventions ==
In 1895 he patented a design for a self-cocking revolver, which was taken up by the Webley & Scott Revolver & Arms Company. The Webley-Fosbery Automatic Revolver was produced as a six-shot .455 caliber and an eight-shot .38 caliber.

In 1885 he patented the Paradox gun. The Paradox design was adopted and produced by the famous gunmaker's Holland & Holland, and so named because only the front two inches of the barrel were rifled; intended to be used as both rifle and shotgun, capable of firing both shot and conical bullets with accuracy.

Marketed by Holland and Holland throughout the British empire for hunting, it was used most prominently in India with the advantage of being powerful enough for tiger, and also able to fire birdshot for snipe. When Fosbury's patent ran out in the late 19th Century, other makers adopted the design, most famously Westley-Richards with their "Explora" model.

== Medals ==
In 1997, Fosbery's Victoria Cross was sold at an Alberta auction for $45,000. His medals are now on display in the Lord Ashcroft Gallery in the Imperial War Museum in London.
