= Beccehamian Rugby Football Club =

English rugby union club

Beccehamians
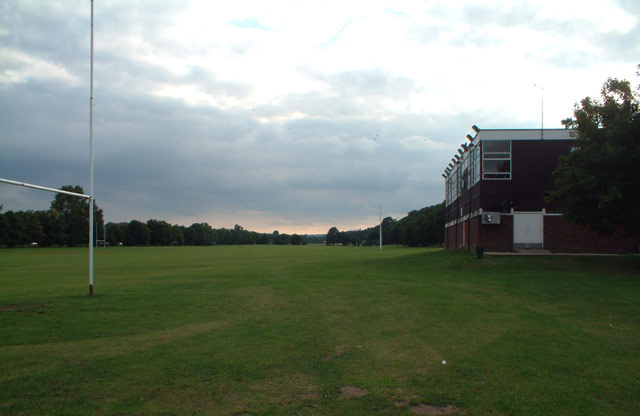
- Full name: Beccehamian Rugby Football Club
- Nickname: Becc's
- Founded: 1933
- Location: Bromley
- Region: Kent
- Ground: Sparrows Den
- Chairman: Nick Brooks
- President: Dave Sweeting

Beccehamian Rugby Union Football Club is an English rugby union team based in Bromley, established in 1933 and based at Sparrows Den in West Wickham (Kent/South East London) and has three full-size grass pitches including one which is floodlit.

Beccehamian is a highly inclusive, family-oriented community club. It operates a large mini & youth section, women's teams(with dedicated changing rooms), and senior men's sides (Level 7), offering a "Kids First" environment, walking rugby, and competitive leagues for all abilities.

Beccehamian has a longstanding association with the Chelsea Pensioners, who have traditionally attended president's lunches and matches at Sparrows Den as guests of the club. The relationship later developed through walking rugby: the Royal Hospital Chelsea's team, the Scarlet Warriors, began playing fixtures against Beccehamian in 2023. Chelsea Pensioners also participated in walking-rugby matches held during the 25th-anniversary celebrations of Beccehamian's women's team in March 2025.

== Ground ==
Beccehamian's ground is Sparrows Den, a large public park and recreational area located on Corkscrew Hill in West Wickham, in the London Borough of Bromley

== History ==
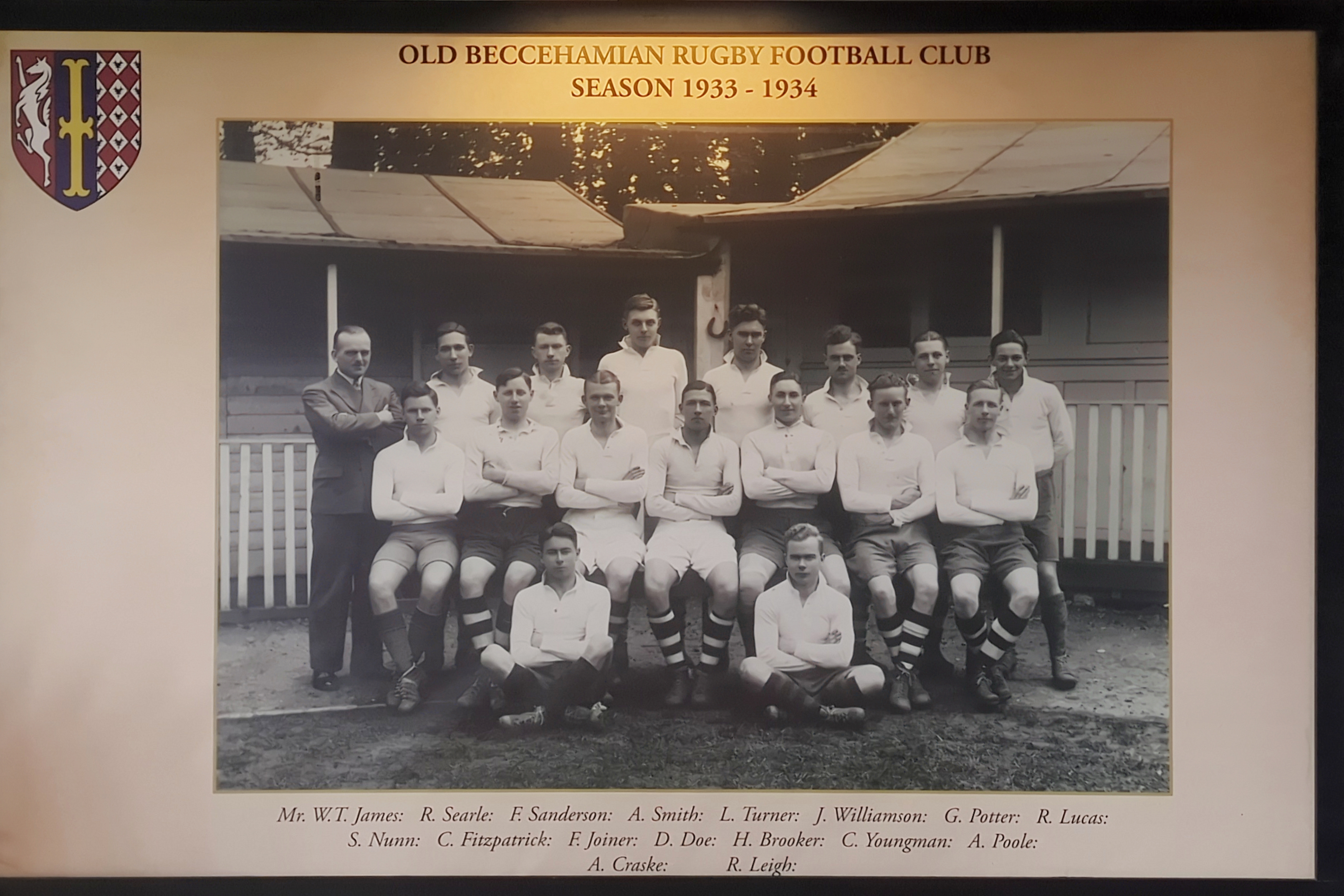
Photo of the Old Becchamians Rugby Football Club team Season 1933 - 1934

Beccehamian Rugby Football Club was founded as Old Beccehamian Rugby Football Club on 18 July 1933 by former pupils of Beckenham County School, later renamed Langley Park School for Boys. Rugby had been introduced at the school two years earlier, and membership of the new club was initially restricted to former pupils. The club regularly fielded two teams before competitive activity was suspended during the Second World War. It resumed playing in 1946 and subsequently began admitting players who had not attended the school.

During its early post-war years, the club played principally on school grounds. In 1954 it obtained permission from Kent County Council to stage home matches at Sparrows Den in West Wickham. Its first clubhouse, situated at the top of Corkscrew Hill, was constructed with financial assistance from the Rugby Football Union and Middlesex County Rugby Football Union and opened on 17 September 1960. A replacement clubhouse adjoining the pitches at Sparrows Den was completed in 1973, consolidating the club's playing and social facilities at one site.

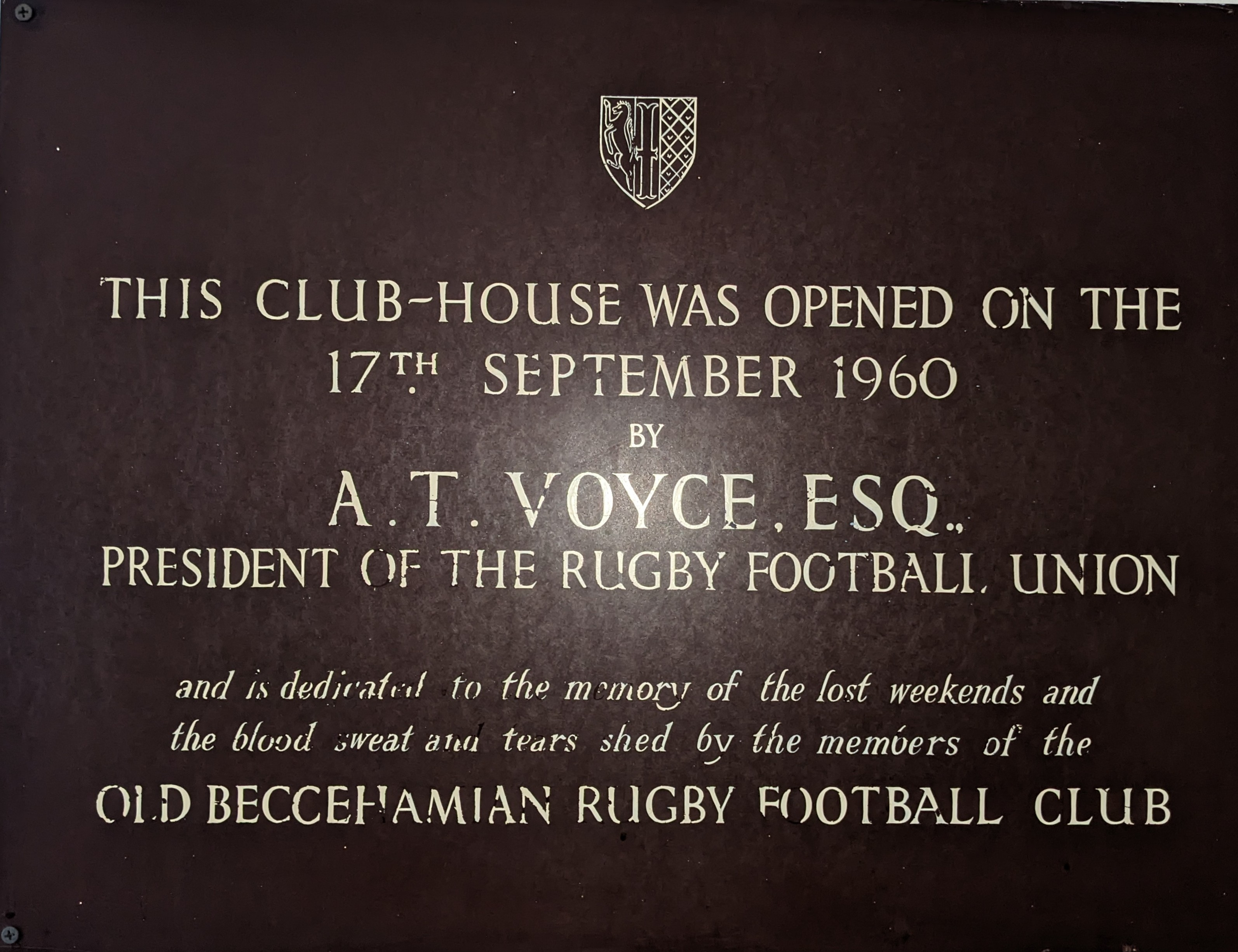
THIS CLUB-HOUSE WAS OPENED ON THE 17TH SEPTEMBER 1960 BY A.T. VOYCE. ESQ PRESIDENT OF THE RUGBY FOOTBALL UNION and is dedicated to the memory of the lost weekends and the blood sweat and tears shed by the members of the OLD BECCEHAMIAN RUGBY FOOTBALL CLUB

The late 1960s and early 1970s were described by the club as a period of considerable playing success, with its first XV recording a winning percentage of 71 per cent between 1966 and 1971. Mini and junior rugby was introduced in the early 1970s under Dennis Oakley, beginning with approximately 50 boys. The section subsequently developed into one of the largest parts of the club. Beccehamian also enjoyed success in rugby sevens, winning the Kentish Times Shield in 1975 and 1980 and later appearing in several competitions at the Middlesex Sevens at Twickenham.

By the 1980s, Beccehamian was regularly fielding six senior teams. In its 1983–84 jubilee season, the first XV won 28 of 36 matches and secured the Radio Kent Merit Table championship. When league rugby was introduced nationally in 1987, the club was placed in London Division 3 South East. In 1997 it formally abandoned its old-boys restriction and adopted the name Beccehamian Rugby Football Club.

A women's section was established in 1999, although the team did not play its first full 15-a-side match until approximately two years later. Girls’ age-grade rugby followed in 2005. The women's team later won its division three times, including an unbeaten 2019–20 campaign which resulted in promotion to National Challenge 1 South East. The team's 25th anniversary was marked in March 2025 alongside the opening of new RFU-compliant changing facilities at Sparrows Den.

The men's first XV won Kent Division 1 in 2005–06, gaining promotion to London 4 South East, and was promoted again in 2012–13 before being relegated the following season. In 2017–18 the club completed a league-and-cup double, winning Kent 1 and the Kent Vase. A second-place finish in London 3 South East in 2018–19 brought a further promotion to London 2 South East, at that time the highest position the club had occupied in the English rugby union league system.

Pitches turned into a lake following a culvert collapse in 2014

In 2014 following storms the culvert allowing the Bourne stream to pass under the pitches collapsed turning them into a lake.

Introduced a mixed walking-rugby section in November 2022, offering a non-contact form of the sport to players of different ages, abilities and levels of experience. The section was competing at festivals by July 2023, when the Kingswood Voice reported that Beccehamian had received the Sporting Team Memorial Shield at the Kingswood Walking Rugby Festival. Later that year, it began playing fixtures against the Scarlet Warriors, the walking-rugby team of the Chelsea Pensioners.

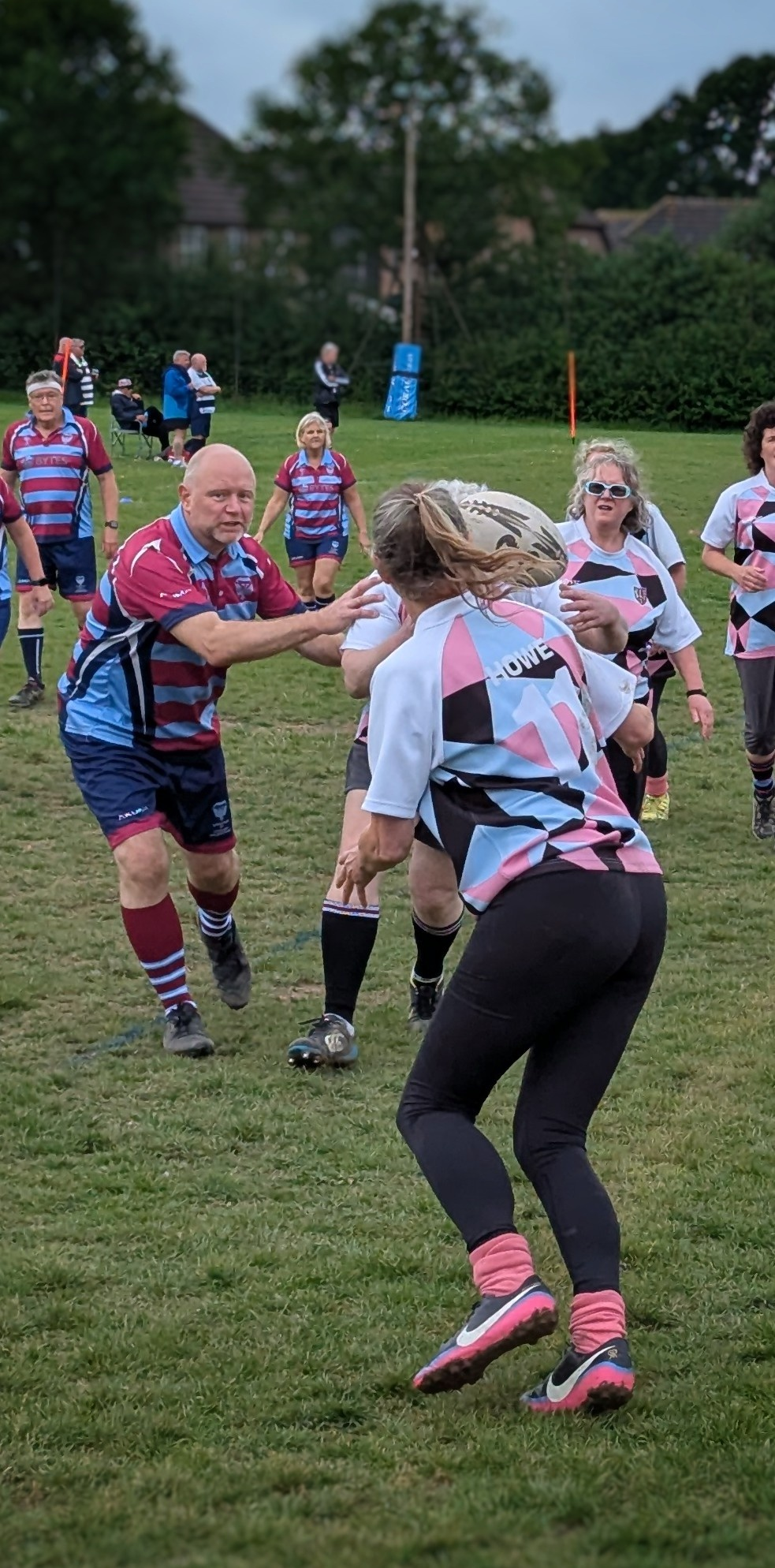
Becchamians playing in a walking-rugby match (in white)

In 2023 a fund raising campaign started "The Beccs Big Build project" to aim to build new changing rooms, install disabled access facilities, and upgrade the clubhouse's social space, by August 2026 the changing room and roof terrace had been built had fundraising continues.

== Honours ==
- men's first XV won Kent Division 1 in 2005–06
- London 3 South West League Champions (2017–18) (promotion achievement)
- Surrey Cup Winners (2018) in county competition
- Kent girls age-group league and cup wins via a combined team with Dartford Valley RFC
- Four-time winner of the Kent Vase, in 2006, 2013, 2017 and 2018
- second XV won the Kent Shield in 2025, defeating Thanet Wanderers 51–46

== Transport ==
The club has a number of buses that pass it, included some that pass the nearest railway station (1.1 miles) "Hayes Kent" (charing cross/ London bridge), Bromley South (Kent Corridor and London Victoria) and East Croydon (Sussex, Clapham Junction and Victoria)
