= Katie Moss =

British singer, musician and composer (1881–1947)

- Born: Kate Emily Barkley Moss; 1881
- Died: 3 May 1947 (aged 65–66)
- Occupations: Singer, musician, composer
- Instruments: Vocals, piano, violin

Kate Emily Barkley Moss (1881 – 3 May 1947) was a British singer, violinist, pianist and composer whose best known work is the popular 1911 song "The Floral Dance".

== Biography ==
Moss was raised in London and studied at the Royal Academy of Music and with Clifford Essex. She later returned to the Royal Academy as an adjudicator of singing prizes. A soprano, she was appreciated by a contemporary critic as "a versatile artiste of great merit". She appeared at venues such as the Norwich Festival (1902) and the Queen's Hall in London.

Moss wrote the lyrics and music to "The Floral Dance" in 1911, after visiting the Cornish mining town of Helston. During her stay there, she attended the town's traditional Flora Day celebration, the Furry Dance, a day-long affair of collective dancing to an old Cornish air. On her way home, she began writing lyrics and later modified the tune as well. The original melody was retained in the chorus, with the remainder of the composition being Moss's own invention. "The Floral Dance" was first recorded in 1912 and has been recorded many times since by such artists as Peter Dawson, Stanley Holloway, The Ivy League and Julie Andrews. A version was featured on the soundtrack of the 1996 film Brassed Off. One music critic considers it a pseudo-folk song while noting that its enduring popularity has helped to sustain and spread the fame of the Furry Dance event itself.

Moss wrote other songs, including "Somewhere in Connemara", "Come Away Moonlight", "The Morris Dancers", "Out of the Silence", as well as a song cycle, Dreams Of Youth, whose five songs are entitled "Faery Song", "The Daisy", "Oh Sleep Little Pearl", "'Twas The Witching Hour Of Night", and "The Devon Maid". None were anywhere near as successful as "The Floral Dance".

Moss died on 3 May 1947.
