= Chelsea Pensioner =

In-pensioner at the Royal Hospital Chelsea

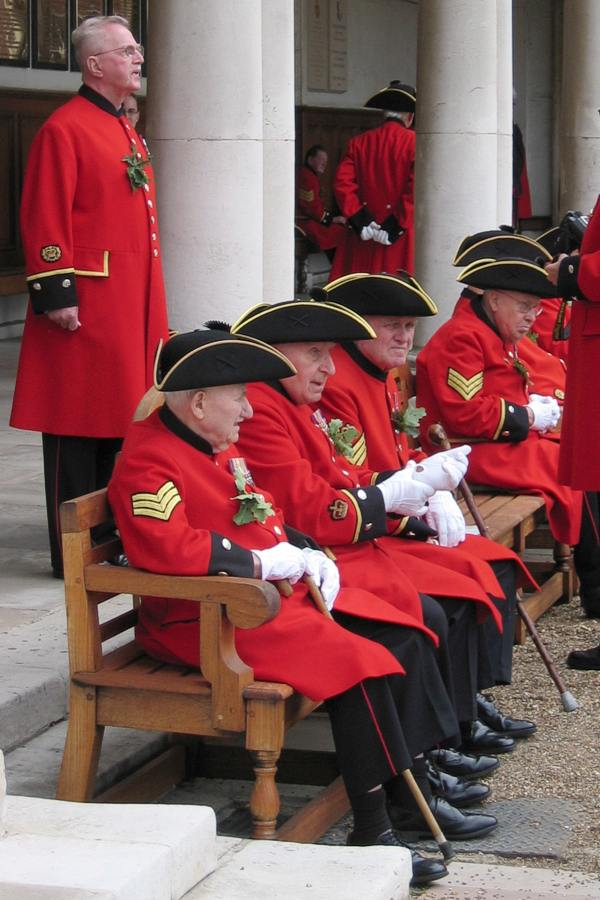
Chelsea pensioners in scarlet coats and tricorne hats at the Founder's Day parade in the Royal Hospital Chelsea

A Chelsea Pensioner, or In-Pensioner, is a resident at the Royal Hospital Chelsea, an Old Soldiers' retirement home and nursing home for former members of the British Army located in Chelsea, London. The Royal Hospital Chelsea is home to 300 retired British soldiers, male and female (the latter since 2009), and is located on Royal Hospital Road. Historically, the term "Chelsea Pensioner" applied more widely, referring to both In-Pensioners and Out-Pensioners who live elsewhere.

== In- and Out-Pensioners ==
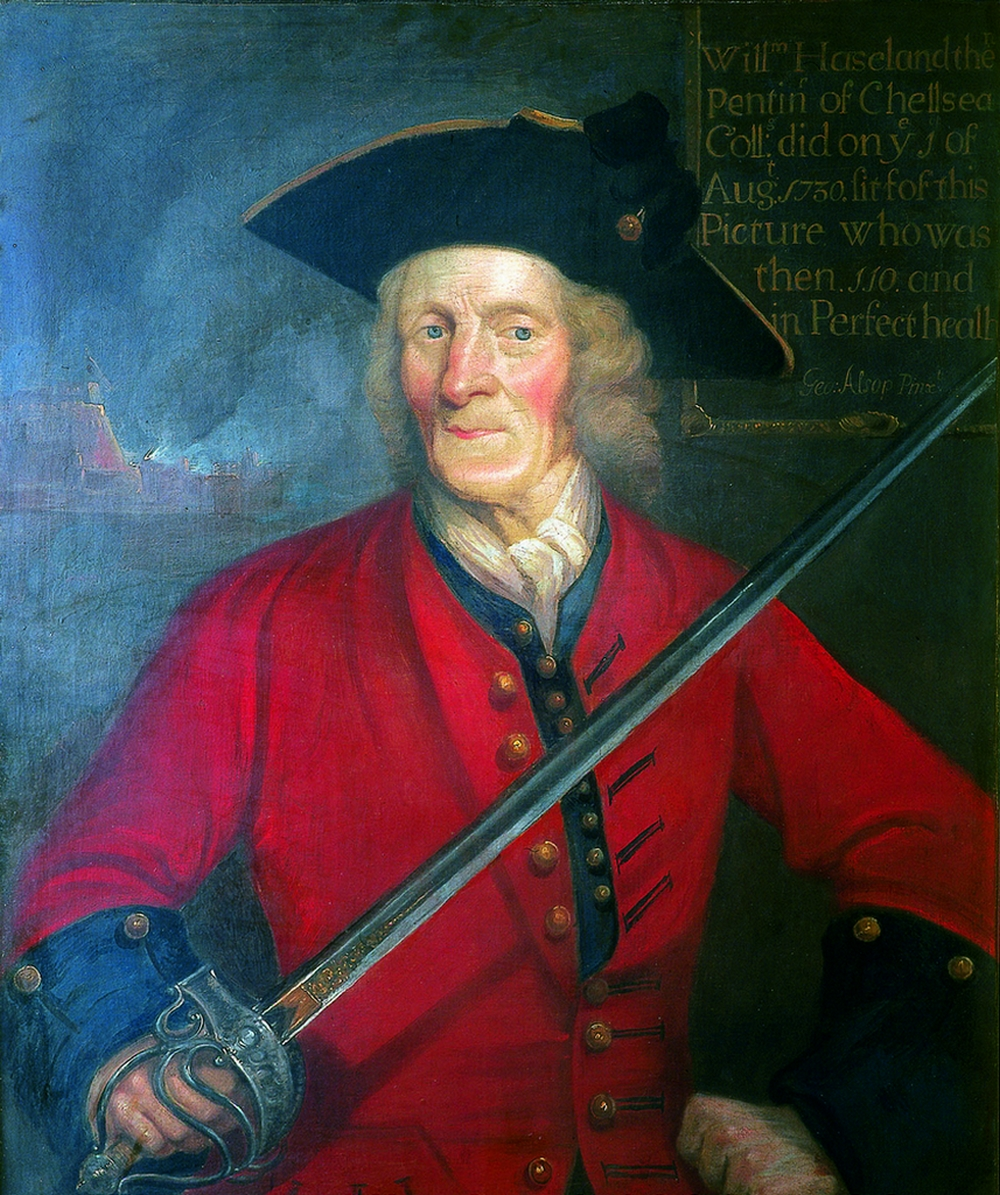
Sergeant William Hiseland, an English Civil War cavalier and one of the first pensioners to be admitted to the Royal Hospital in London

The Royal Hospital was founded by King Charles II in 1682 as a retreat for veterans. The provision of a hostel rather than the payment of pensions was inspired by Les Invalides in Paris.

During the reign of King William III and Queen Mary II, the Royal Hospital was still under construction so they introduced a system for distribution of army pensions in 1689. The pension was to be made available to all former soldiers who had been injured in service, or who had served for more than 20 years.

By the time the Royal Hospital was completed, there were more pensioners than places available in the Royal Hospital. Eligible ex-soldiers who could not be housed in the Hospital were termed Out-Pensioners, receiving their pension from the Royal Hospital but living outside it. In-Pensioners, by contrast, surrender their army pension and live within the Royal Hospital. A number of veterans were incorporated into the Corps of Invalids from 1688 to 1802, receiving the equivalent of the out-pension in exchange for performing garrison duty.

In 1703 there were 51 Out-Pensioners. By 1815 this had risen to 36,757. The Royal Hospital remained responsible for distributing army pensions until 1955, following which the phrase "Out-Pensioner" became less common, and "Chelsea Pensioner" was used largely to refer to "In-Pensioners".

== Conditions for admission ==
To be eligible for admission as a Chelsea Pensioner a candidate must be a former soldier or non-commissioned officer of the British Army (including National Service) or a former officer of the British Army who served in the ranks or was awarded a disablement pension while serving in the ranks. They must be of pensionable age, be able to live independently on arrival at the Royal Hospital Chelsea and be free of any financial obligation to support a spouse or family.

== Life of In-Pensioners ==
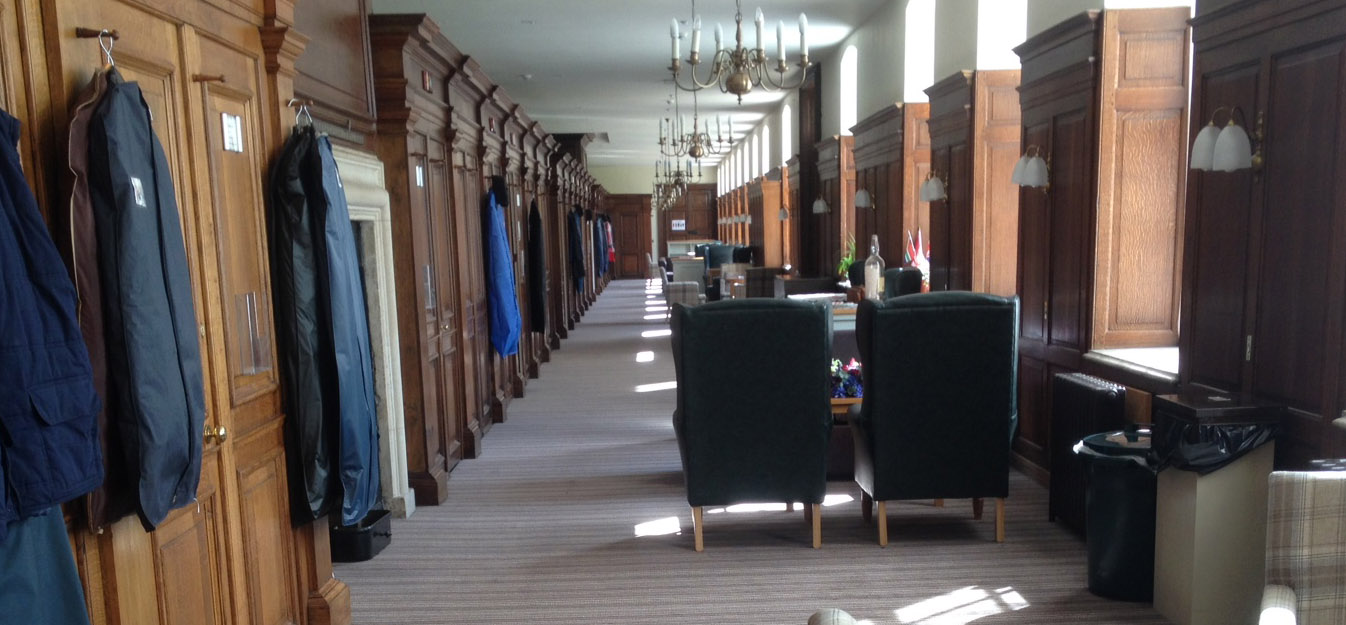
A ward within the Royal Hospital Chelsea

Applicants for the Royal Hospital Chelsea (RHC) are invited for a four-day stay during which they get a taste of what life is like for a Chelsea Pensioner. If they enjoy their stay and it is felt that they will fit in they are invited to become a Chelsea Pensioner. Upon arrival at the Royal Hospital, each In-Pensioner is measured up for their Blues (day-to-day uniform) and Scarlets (the famous uniform that they wear on parade). They are given their own room, or "berth" in a ward, and are allocated to a Company. Up until refurbishment works carried out in the 1950s, these rooms measured 6 × 6 feet. Work completed in 2015 has ensured that all In-Pensioner berths include en suite facilities, a writing desk, and natural light.

On entry, In-Pensioners surrender their army pension, in return receiving board, lodging, clothing and full medical care.

In-Pensioners also have their own club with a bar, lounges and restaurant; there are allotments for those who enjoy gardening and facilities for lawn bowls. If an In-Pensioner becomes unwell they are moved into the Infirmary, which is a care home with nursing and a G.P. medical centre. The Royal Hospital Burial Ground is at Brookwood Cemetery in Surrey.

The Chelsea Pensioners were among the first to be included in the UK's rollout of COVID-19 vaccinations, having received their first dose on 23 December 2020.

== Admission of women ==
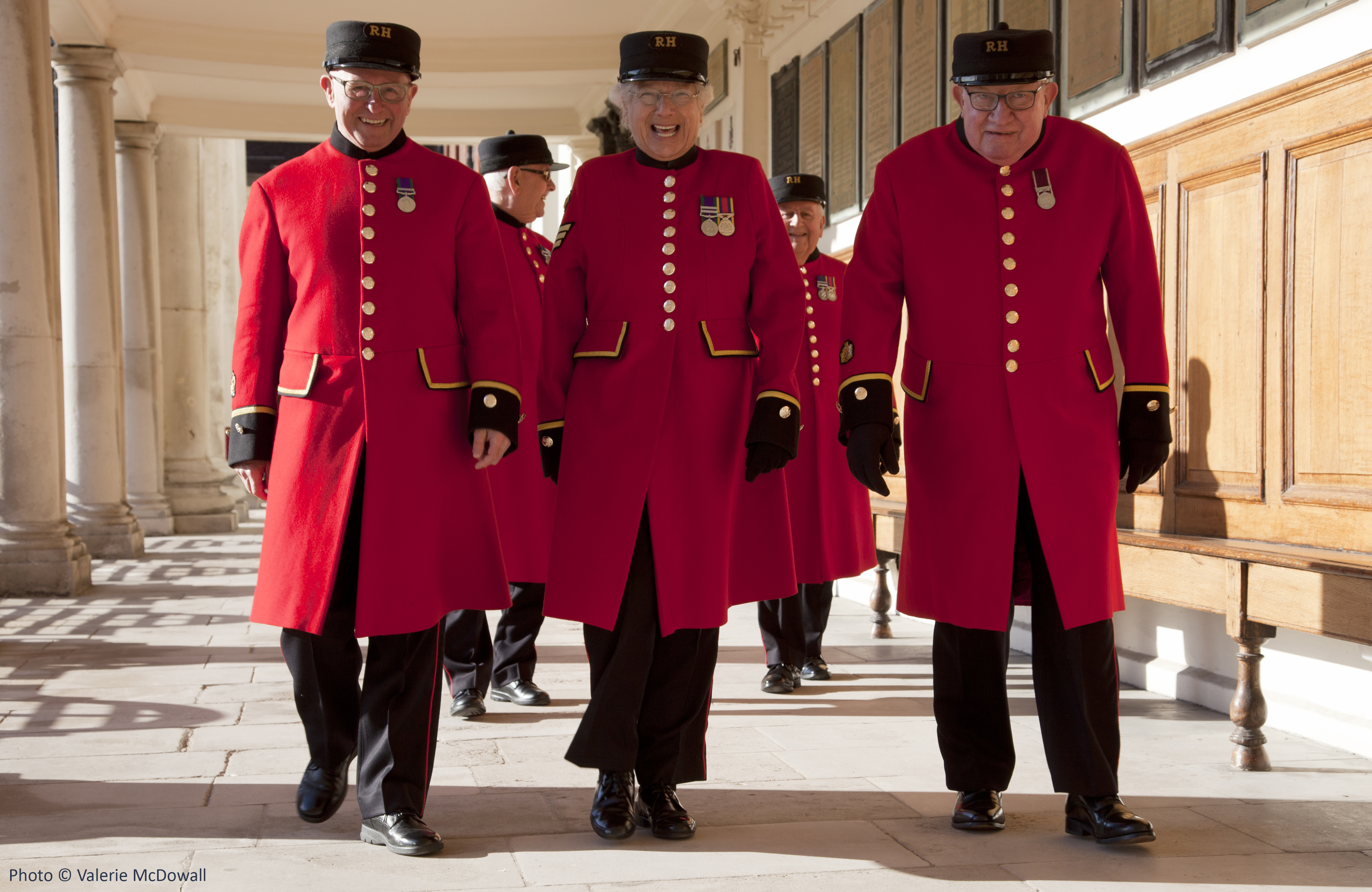
Marjorie Cole, middle, one of few female Chelsea Pensioners at the Royal Hospital

The records at Royal Hospital show that a woman, Christian Davies, was admitted to Chelsea Hospital c. 1717, and was awarded a pension for her service in the army and the wounds she received in the service of Queen Anne. She died in 1739 and was buried in the Royal Hospital Chelsea with full military honours.

From Davies' death until 2009, only male candidates were admitted. It was announced in 2007 that female ex-service personnel would be admitted on the completion of modernisation of the long wards. In March 2009 the first women in the Hospital's 317-year history were admitted as In-Pensioners: Dorothy Hughes (aged 85) and Winifred Phillips (aged 82).

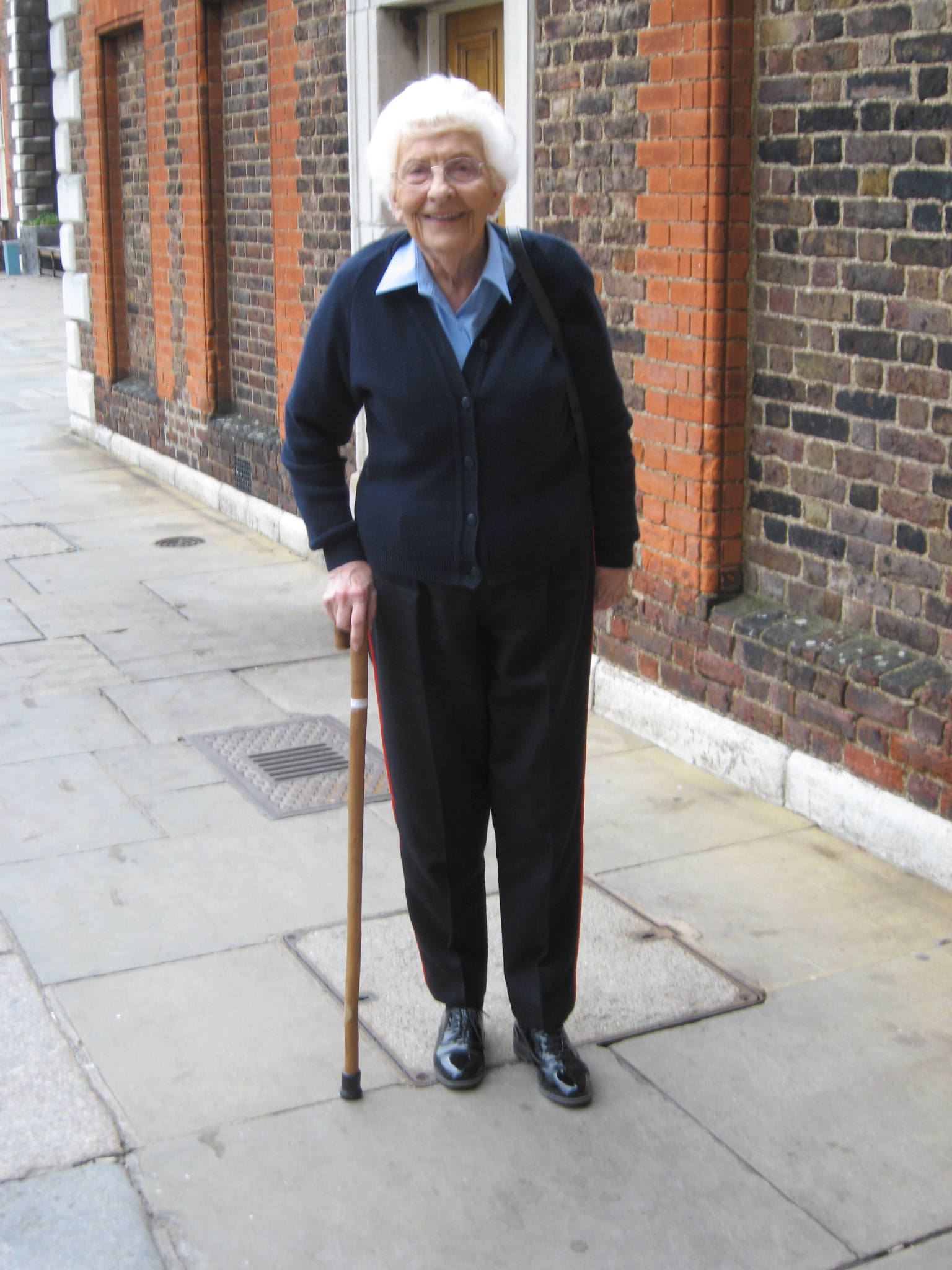
In-Pensioner Dorothy Hughes in 2013

Winifred Phillips (1926–2016) trained as a nurse and joined the Auxiliary Territorial Service in 1948 and enlisted in the Women's Royal Army Corps in 1949 while serving in Egypt. For the next 22 years she served in Singapore, Cyprus and Egypt reaching the rank of Warrant Officer Class 2. She wrote two books about becoming one of the first female Chelsea Pensioners: My Journey to Becoming the First Lady Chelsea Pensioner (2010), and Mum's Army: Love and Adventure from the NAAFI to Civvy Street (2013). She never married.

Dorothy Hughes joined the British Army in 1941, later working as part of 450 Heavy Anti Aircraft Battery in the London Division. In 1945 the Battery was deployed near Dover to defend against V-1 flying bomb attacks. She later worked with the Army Operational Research Group developing fuses in shells used against V-2 rockets and was discharged from the Army in 1946 with the rank of Sergeant.

== Clothing ==
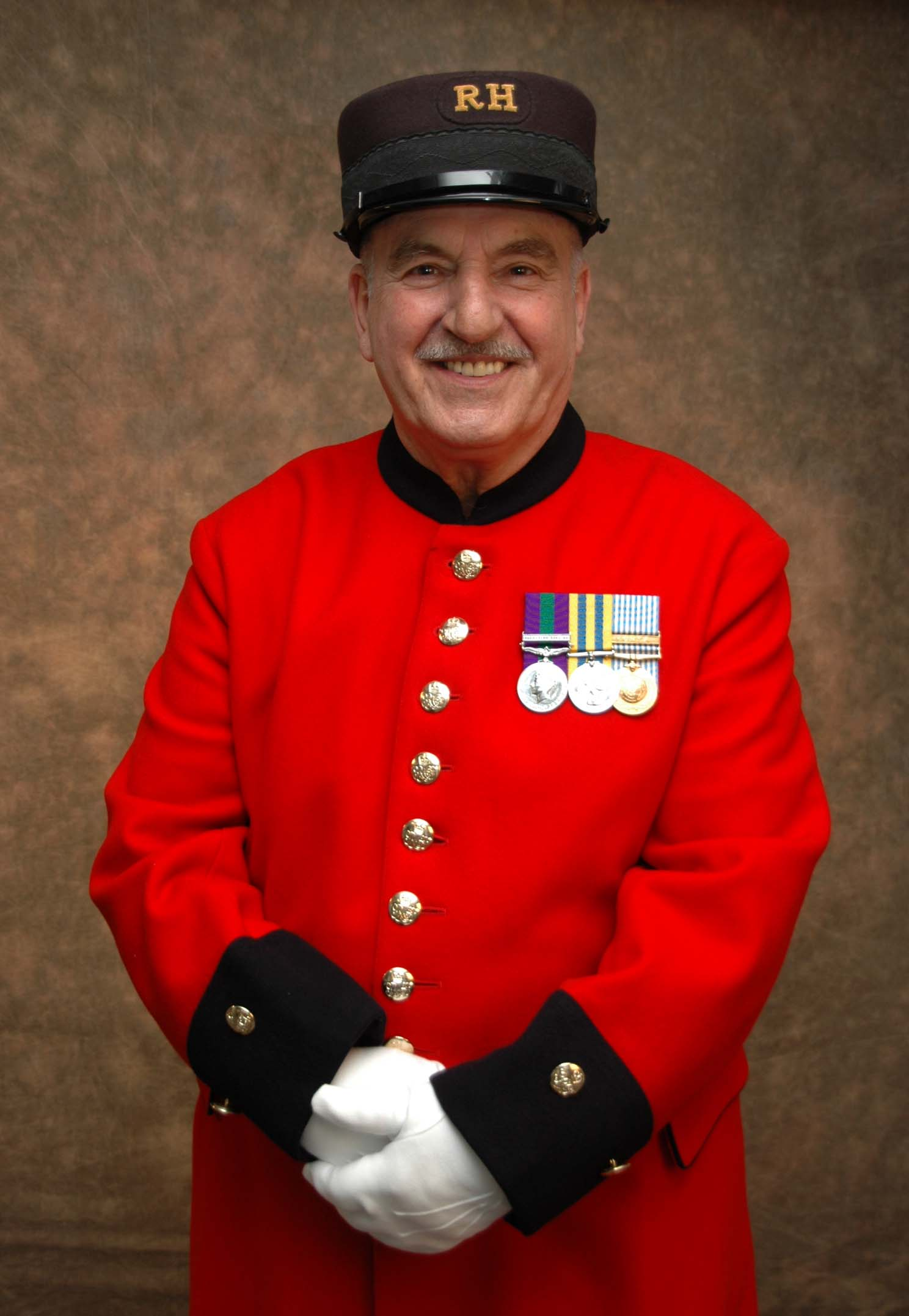
A Chelsea Pensioner in scarlet uniform and shako.

Chelsea Pensioners are entitled to come and go from the Royal Hospital as they please, and are permitted to wear civilian clothing wherever they travel. However, within the Hospital, and in the surrounding area, they are encouraged to wear a blue uniform. If they travel further from the Royal Hospital, they should wear the distinctive scarlet coats instead of the blue uniform. The scarlet coats are also worn for ceremonial occasions, accompanied by tricorne hats. At other times a peaked hat, known as a shako, is generally worn.

In uniform, the pensioners wear their medal ribbons and the insignia of the rank they reached while serving in the armed forces. They may also wear other insignia they earned during their service and this has included parachute jump wings and SAS jump wings.

== Memorials and burial sites ==
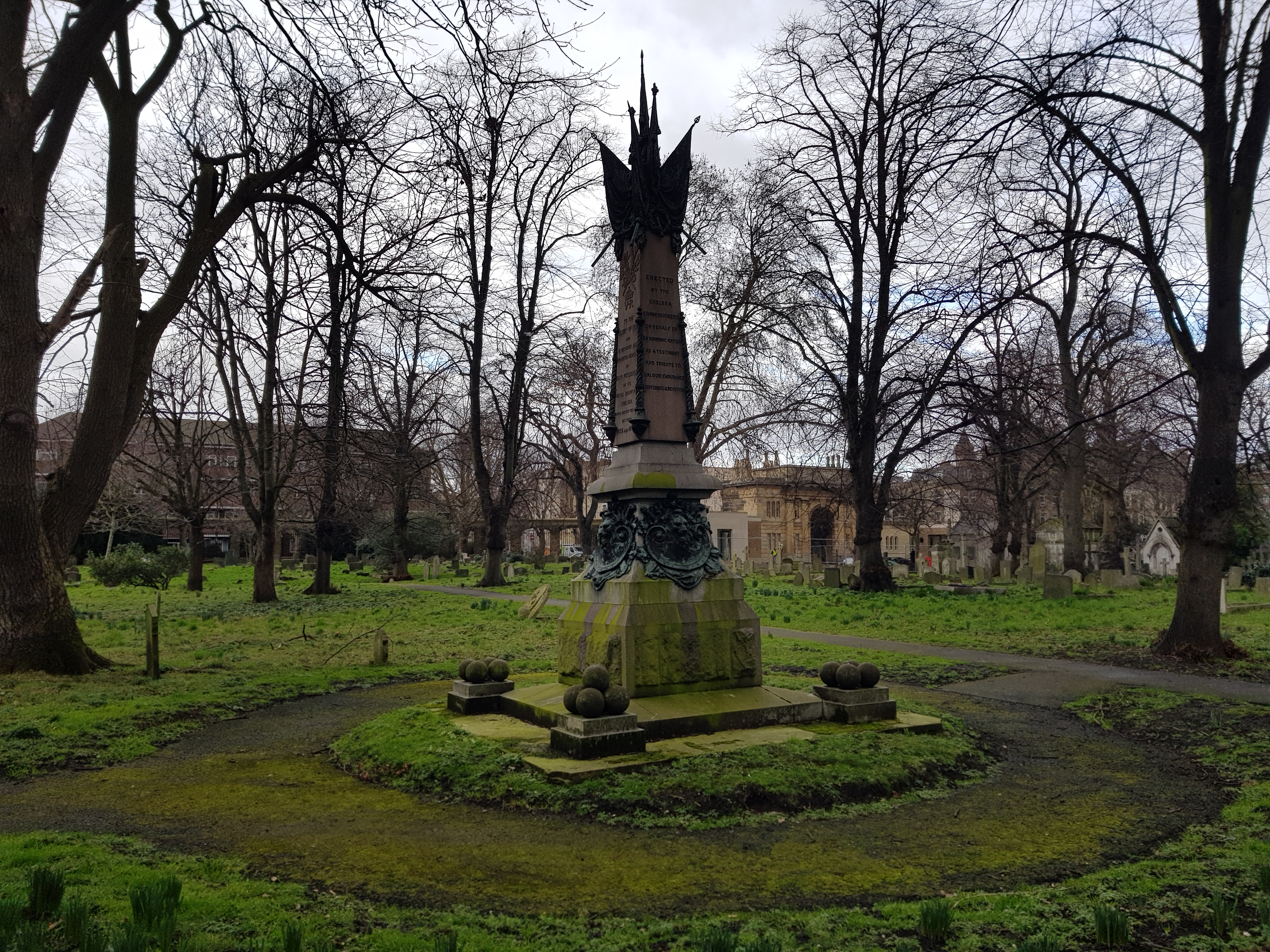
Chelsea Pensioners' Monument in Brompton Cemetery

Several cemeteries have memorials to and graves of Chelsea Pensioners. Burials were initially at Old Burial Ground, Royal Hospital Chelsea and then Brompton Cemetery, where the Chelsea Pensioners' Monument was erected in 1901. Since 1893, burials have taken place at Brookwood Cemetery in Surrey where the care of the graves was transferred in 1961 to the Commonwealth War Graves Commission.

== Men In Scarlet album ==
Seven Chelsea Pensioners at the Royal Hospital Chelsea released an album on 8 November 2010 in order to raise money for the Chelsea Pensioners' Appeal. Featuring Dame Vera Lynn, Katherine Jenkins, The Soldiers and Janey Cutler, the album is full of well known wartime songs and includes their traditional march, "The Old Brigade".

== Chelsea Football Club ==
Nearby Chelsea Football Club has been affiliated with the Chelsea Pensioners for many years; the club's first nickname was the Pensioners and until the 1950s the club crest featured a Chelsea pensioner. Residents of the Hospital can be seen attending Chelsea's home games at Stamford Bridge.

When Chelsea won the Premier League title in 2005, Chelsea Pensioners formed a guard of honour as the players and management came out for the trophy presentation. This was repeated when Chelsea won the title in 2010. In tribute to the trademark scarlet coats worn by the pensioners, Chelsea's kit for the 2010–11 season featured a red trim on the collars.

== Walking Rugby ==
Since April 2023 the pensioners have a "walking Rugby" team called "the scarlet warriors" who play competitively against other teams such as Beccehamian Rugby Football Club's.

== Genealogical records ==
Given that Royal Hospital Chelsea was responsible for administering pensions until the First World War, it retained copies of service records up to that time. In principle, the records were kept for all persons in receipt of a pension. For others, their records were retained for fifty years after discharge. These have been digitised, and can be viewed via various genealogy subscription sites.

=== In-Pensioners ===
There are admission & discharge registers of in-Pensioners that have survived. They have been digitised, and can be accessed via various genealogy subscription sites.

=== Out-Pensioners ===
There are admission registers of out-Pensioners that have survived. Some of these had served long enough to accrue a deferred income. Others were in receipt of a pension, owing to being medically discharged from the army. They have been digitised, and can be accessed via a paywall.

== See also ==
- Chelsea Pensioners reading the Waterloo Dispatch
