= The Floral Dance =

1911 English song by Katie Moss

Song
- Written: 1911
- Published: 1911
- Composer: Katie Moss
- Lyricist: Katie Moss

"The Floral Dance" is a Cornish song describing the annual Furry Dance in Helston, Cornwall, UK.

The music and lyrics were written in 1911 by Kate Emily Barkley ("Katie") Moss (1881–1947) who was a professional violinist, pianist and concert singer. She was brought up in London and studied at the Royal Academy of Music.

The song tells the story of an incident that apparently actually happened to Moss herself on a visit to Helston during the springtime 'Furry Dance' celebrations and the song was reportedly written directly afterwards as she was going home on the train.

The songbook cover states that the music was "founded on an old Cornish air". Moss introduces the original Furry Dance tune in the piano part just as the singer is describing the sound of the band, with its "cornet, clarinet and big trombone; fiddle, cello, big bass drum; bassoon, flute and euphonium".

"The Floral Dance" was first recorded in 1912 by the Australian bass/baritone Peter Dawson, and many other versions have appeared since. Frederick Ranalow's recording was made in order to cash in on the sales of the Dawson version. The 1960s saw versions by The Eagles (UK), Ken Sims' Vintage Jazz Band (UK) and The Ivy League (UK). In 1970, the cast of Dad's Army performed a sketch ('The Cornish Floral Dance') for Christmas Night with the Stars. They repeated their versions in the 1975 Royal Variety Performance at the London Palladium.

Moss's song experienced a revival in a purely instrumental arrangement for the Brighouse and Rastrick Brass Band by their MD Derek Broadbent, which sold half a million copies and reached No. 2 in the UK Singles Chart by Christmas 1977. The revival was prompted by BBC Radio 2 disc jockey Terry Wogan, who had taken to playing the record in his radio show and gently singing the lyrics over the top of the instrumental performance. In 1978, Wogan recorded a commercial version which reached No. 21 in the same chart. Wogan's version was accompanied by the Hanwell Band from west London, and omitted the final verse containing the climax to the story. On Top of the Pops, Wogan sang it live to a backing track. An instrumental version was recorded in 1979 by Gheorghe Zamfir. A version of the piece performed by Grimethorpe Colliery Band was prominently featured near the beginning of the 1996 film, Brassed Off.

In 2016, a campaign for Christmas Number One was launched for Terry Wogan's version of "The Floral Dance" after his death. All proceeds of the downloaded single were to be given to Children in Need.
