= 4th Bengal European Regiment =

Bengal European Regiment

The 4th Bengal European Regiment was an infantry regiment of the British East India Company, created in 1858 and disbanded in 1867.

The regiment was raised in Bengal by the East India Company in 1858, for service in the Indian Mutiny; the "European" in the name indicated that it was manned primarily by British soldiers and some other west Europeans, not Indian sepoys. The regiment was composed of officers drawn from Indian units which had mutinied and been disbanded.

As with all other "European" units of the Company, they were placed under the command of the Crown following the end of the Mutiny in 1858. The regiment was reduced to cadre strength in 1861, and disbanded in 1867.

George Fosbery won his Victoria Cross with the regiment in 1863.
