= The Old Brigade =

For the Irish Republican song see The Boys of the Old Brigade

The Old Brigade is a slow march composed in 1881 with music by Irishman Odoardo Barri, and words by Frederic Weatherly. It was popularised by a recording of 1926 by Peter Dawson. This is a slow march that is always played in Britain at the annual Festival of Remembrance and at the Cenotaph on Remembrance Sunday when the Chelsea Pensioners march.

== Lyrics ==
Where are the boys of the old Brigade,
Who fought with us side by side?
Shoulder to shoulder, and blade by blade,
Fought till they fell and died!
Who so ready and undismayed?
Who so merry and true?
Where are the boys of the old Brigade?
Where are the lads we knew?

Then steadily shoulder to shoulder,
Steadily blade by blade!
Ready and strong, marching along
Like the boys of the old Brigade!

Over the sea far away they lie,
Far from the land of their love;
Nations alter, the years go by,
But Heav'n still is Heav'n above,
Not in the abbey proudly laid
Find they a place or part;
The gallant boys of the old Brigade,
They sleep in old England’s heart.

Then steadily shoulder to shoulder,
Steadily blade by blade!
Ready and strong, marching along
Like the boys of the old Brigade!

These words are now in the public domain.
