= Frederic Weatherly =

English barrister and lyricist (1848-1929)

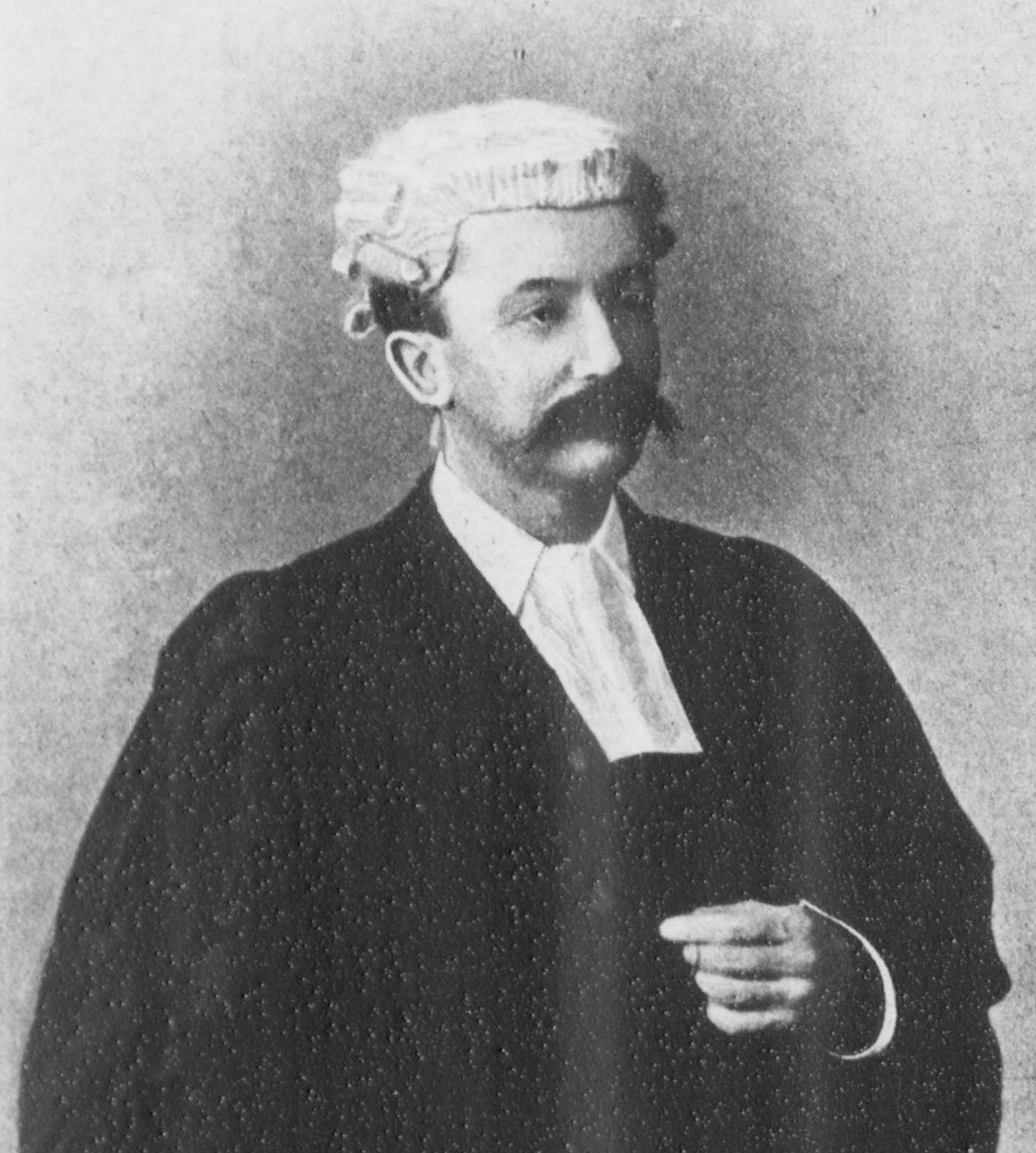
Weatherly in 1895

Frederic Edward Weatherly, KC (4 October 1848 – 7 September 1929) was an English lawyer, author, lyricist and broadcaster. He was christened and brought up using the name Frederick Edward Weatherly, and appears to have adopted the spelling 'Frederic' later in life. He is estimated to have written the lyrics to at least 3,000 popular songs, among the best-known of which are the sentimental ballad "Danny Boy" set to the tune "Londonderry Air", the religious "The Holy City", and the wartime song "Roses of Picardy".

== Life and career ==
Weatherly was born and brought up in Portishead, Somerset, England, the eldest son in the large family of Frederick Weatherly (1820–1910), a medical doctor, and his wife, Julia Maria, née Ford (1823–98). His birth was registered in the Bedminster district of Bristol in the fourth quarter of 1848, and the 1851 census shows the family living at 5 Wood Hill, Portishead. He was educated at Hereford Cathedral School from 1859 to 1867, and he won a scholarship to Brasenose College, Oxford, in 1867. Among his tutors was Walter Pater, who taught him about Italian art. Weatherly entered three times for the Newdigate Prize for poetry—without success. In 1868, he helped out members of the Brasenose rowing team under Walter Bradford Woodgate, who had practised for the Stewards' Challenge Cup at Henley Royal Regatta without a cox. The race at the time was for coxed fours, and Weatherly volunteered to start the race with them and immediately jump out of the boat. He did so—and the team won—but they were disqualified. Woodgate had made his point, and the race was later changed to one for coxless fours. Weatherly graduated with a degree in Classics in 1871, and in 1872 he married Anna Maria Hardwick (generally called "Minnie") of Axbridge in Somerset (d. 1920), with whom he had a son and two daughters. Weatherly and his wife later lived apart, and on the night of the 1881 census he is recorded as being on his own with his three young children and four servants at his house, Sevensprings, South Parks Road, Oxford. Weatherly and his wife later separated (around 1900).

Weatherly remained in Oxford, briefly working as a schoolmaster and then as a private tutor until 1887 when he qualified as a barrister, practising first in London and then in the west of England. The 1901 census records him living as a boarder at 2 Harley Place in Clifton, Bristol. The 1911 census shows him aged 62 living at 12 Penn Lea Road, Lower Weston, Bath, in Somerset, with a Maude Eugenie Beatrice Weatherly, aged 53, from Esher in Surrey (who is recorded as his wife of nine years' standing), and their two servants. In fact, Weatherly and his wife Minnie never divorced: Maude Francfort used the name Weatherly while they lived together as husband and wife in Bath. Minnie lived on in seclusion in Portishead, financially supported by her husband until her death in 1920. The children remained loyal to her. Some time after 1911, Frederic and Maude moved to Grosvenor Lodge (now St Christopher's) in Belmont Road, Combe Down, just outside Bath.

Weatherly remained active both as an author and as a barrister until the end of his life. The Times wrote of his dual career, "His fertility was extraordinary, and though it is easy to be contemptuous of his drawing-room lyrics, sentimental, humorous and patriotic, which are said to number about 3,000 altogether, it is certain that no practising barrister has ever before provided so much innocent pleasure." He celebrated his golden jubilee as a songwriter in 1919, at a dinner given for him by publishers and composers with whom he had been associated over the past fifty years. In his last years he was much in demand as a lecturer, broadcaster and after-dinner speaker.

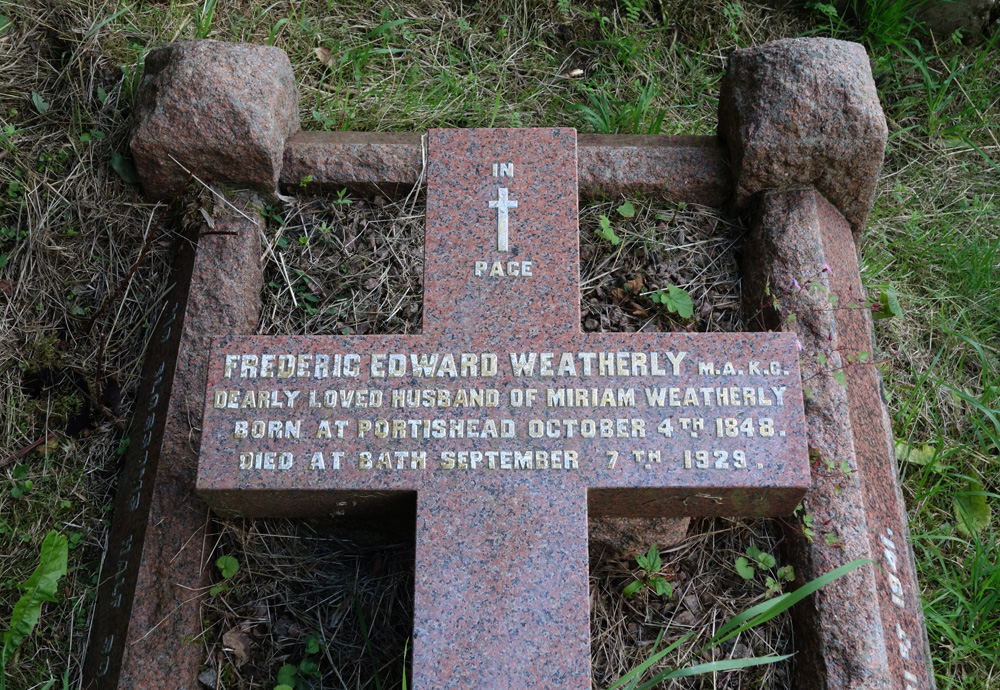
Frederic Weatherly's grave (detail), Smallcombe Cemetery, Bath

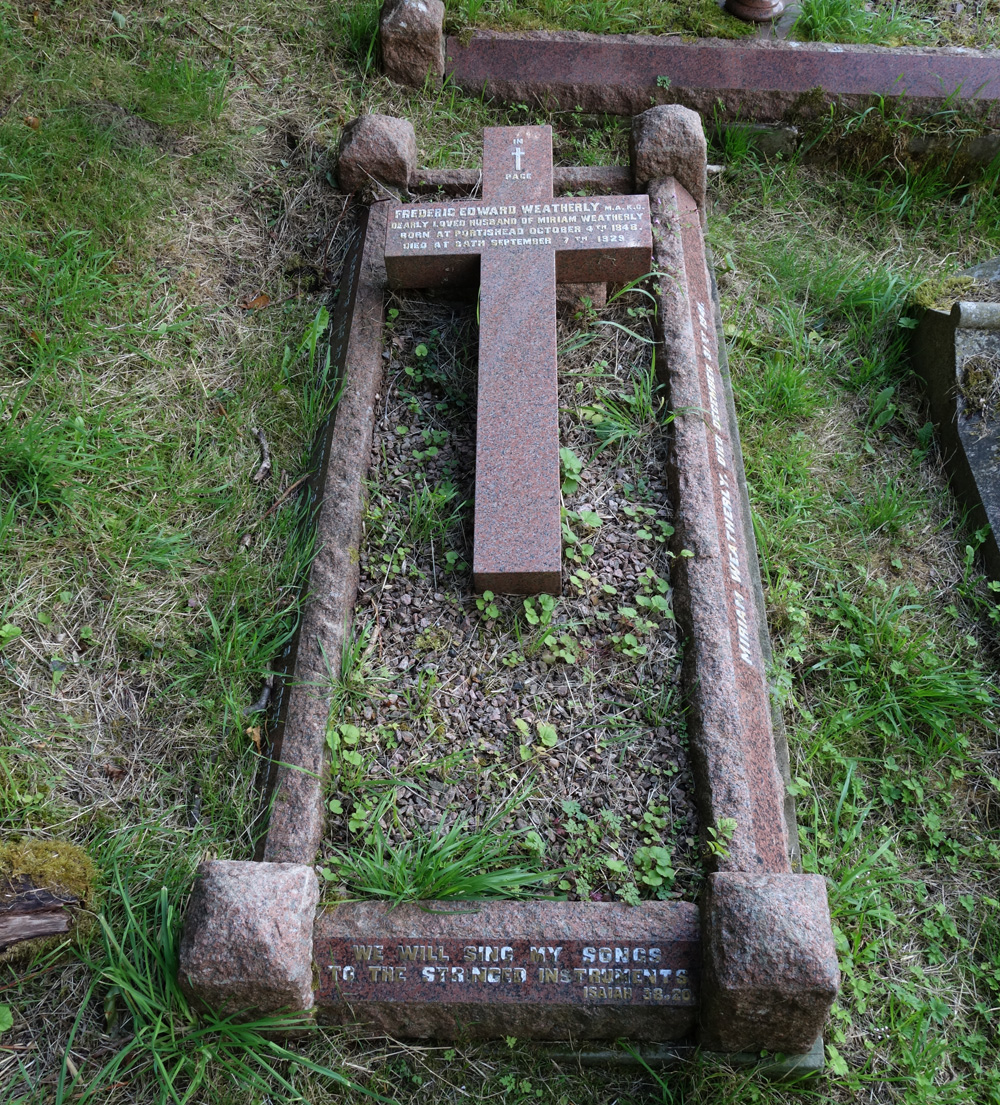
Frederic Weatherly's grave, Smallcombe Cemetery, Bath

In early 1923, Maude Francfort died, and on 2 August 1923 Weatherly married Miriam Bryan, née Davies (d. 1941), widow of a well-known tenor, John Bryan. She had been nurse/companion to Maude in her final years. He was made a King's Counsel, a senior barrister, in 1926. In the same year he published an autobiography, Piano and Gown. He died at his home, Bathwick Lodge, Bath, after a short illness on 7 September 1929, at the age of 80. At his funeral in Bath Abbey, the Londonderry Air, to which he had written the well-known words, was played as a voluntary. He was buried at Smallcombe Cemetery. A plaque unveiled by Dame Clara Butt commemorates him at 10 Edward St in Bath.

== Works ==
The first of Weatherly's well-known works was the hymn "The Holy City", written in 1892 to music by the British composer Stephen Adams. The song includes the refrain "Jerusalem, Jerusalem!". He wrote the song "Danny Boy" while living in Bath in 1910, but it did not meet with much success. In 1912 his sister-in-law Margaret Enright Weatherly in America suggested an old Irish tune called "Londonderry Air", which he had never heard before. Margaret had learned the tune from her Irish-born father Dennis. The tune matched his lyrics almost perfectly. He published the now-famous song in 1913. His ballad "Roses of Picardy", written in 1916 and set to music by Haydn Wood, was one of the most famous songs from World War I.

Of his huge output of songs, Weatherly listed a selection of 61 titles in his Who's Who entry. In addition to the above, they were: "Nancy Lee"; "The Midshipmite"; "Polly"; "They all love Jack"; "Jack's Yarn"; "The Old Brigade"; "The Deathless Army"; "To the Front"; "John Bull"; "Darby and Joan"; "When We are Old and Grey"; "Auntie"; "The Chimney Corner"; "The Children's Home"; "The Old Maids of Lee"; "The Men of Ware"; "The Devoted Apple"; "To-morrow will be Friday"; "Douglas Gordon"; "Sleeping Tide"; "The Star of Bethlehem"; "Beauty's Eyes"; "In Sweet September"; "Bid me Good-bye"; "The Last Watch"; "London Bridge"; "The King's Highway"; "Go to Sea"; "Veteran's Song"; "Up from Somerset"; "Beyond the Dawn"; "Nirvana"; "Mifanwy"; "Sergeant of the Line"; "Stone-cracker John"; "Ailsa Mine"; "Old Black Mare"; "Coolan Dhu"; "Three for Jack"; "Bhoy I Love"; "The Blue Dragoons"; "At Santa Barbara"; "Mona"; "The Grenadier"; "Reuben Ranzo"; "Dinder Courtship"; "Friend o'Mine"; "When You Come Home"; "Little Road Home"; "Greenhills of Somerset"; "Danny Boy"; "As you pass by"; "Ships of my dreams"; "Why shouldn't I?"; "When Noah Went-a-sailing"; "Time to go"; "Chumleigh Fair"; "Our Little Home"; "The Bristol Pageant, Music Composed by Hubert Hunt in 1924" and "Little Lady of the Moon".

Weatherly's prose publications include Wilton School, (1872); The Rudiments of Logic, Inductive and Deductive, (1879); Oxford Days: or How Ross got his Degree, (1879); Questions in Logic, Progressive and General, (1883) and Musical and Dramatic Copyright (1890), with Edward Cutler. He published several collections of verse including Muriel and other Poems; Dresden China and other Songs; and Songs for Michael, 1927. Beatrix Potter's first signed illustrations were published in A Happy Pair, a book of verse written by Weatherly.

Weatherly also worked in opera, making English translations of Pagliacci and Cavalleria rusticana, for Covent Garden and writing the lyrics for the 1894 premiere of Mirette at the Savoy Theatre.
