= Roses of Picardy =

20th century British song

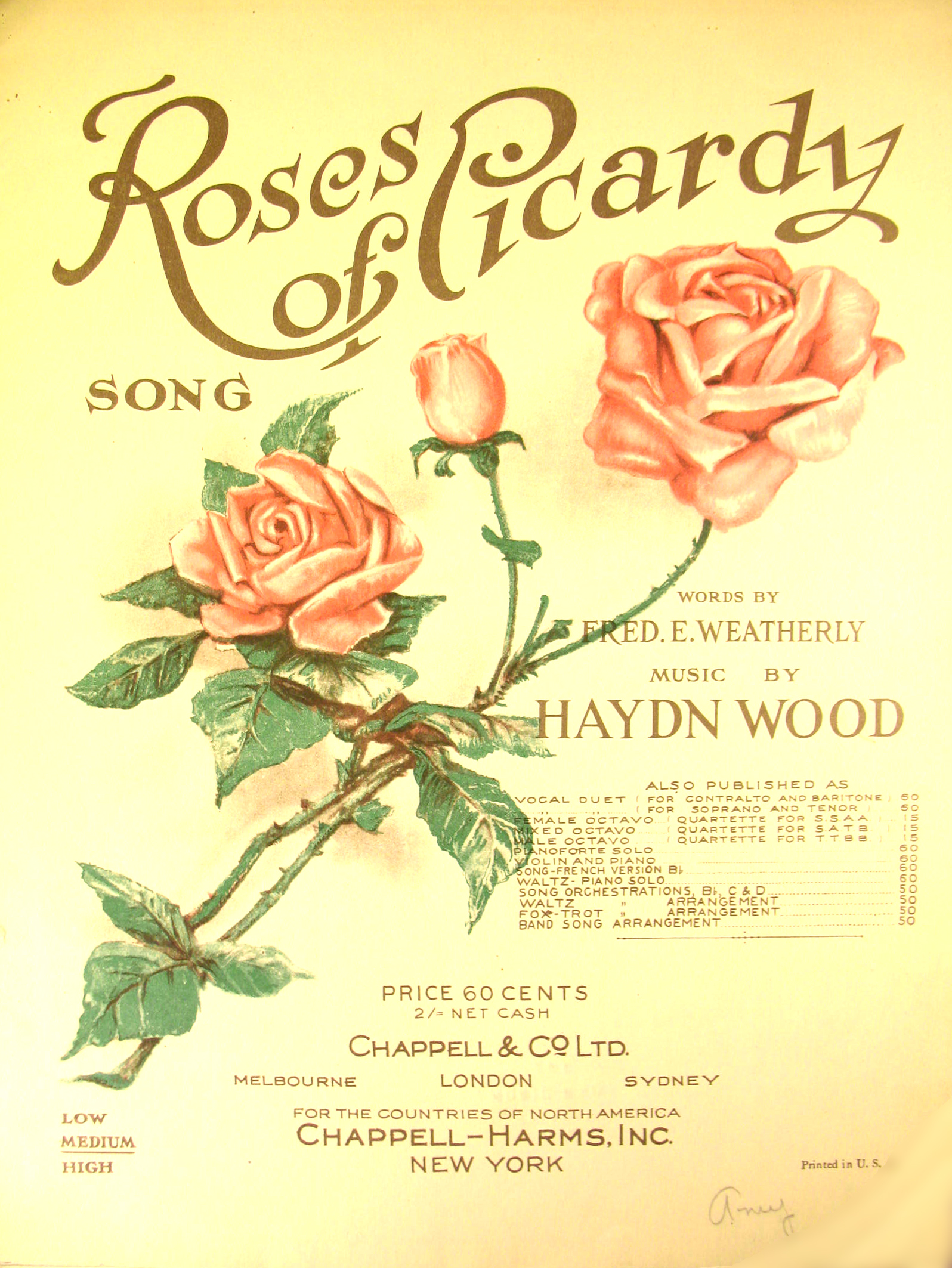
- Sheet music from c. 1920

Song
- Published: 1916, (London, England)
- Genre: Popular standard
- Composer: Haydn Wood
- Lyricist: Frederic Weatherly

"Roses of Picardy" is a popular British song with lyrics by Frederic Weatherly and music by Haydn Wood. Published in London in 1916 by Chappell & Co, it is one of the most famous songs of the First World War and has been recorded frequently up to the present day.

== Background ==
The lyricist Fred Weatherly had become impressed with beauty of the voice of the soprano Elsie Griffin, who later became a leading artiste with the D'Oyly Carte Opera Company. Her singing of his compositions resulted in his writing two of the most popular hits of the 20th-century: "Danny Boy" (1910) and "Roses of Picardy". The composer Haydn Wood wrote the music for over 200 ballads, of which "Roses of Picardy" became his most popular. Wood related that the melody came to him as he was going home one night on the top of a London bus. He jumped off the bus and wrote down the refrain on an old envelope while standing under a street lamp.

The exact story that lies behind the words of the song is unclear, but in his 1926 memoirs, Weatherly suggested that it concerned a love affair of one of his close friends. (Note: It seems unlikely that the love affair involved Weatherly himself, as he was a retired barrister, aged 66, when the First World War started.) Weatherly himself travelled in France, but visited the Rhone valley and Chamonix. Picardy was a pre-Revolutionary province in the north of France near the Channel, the site of battles during the Hundred Years’ War and mentioned in Shakespeare's history plays. In the 20th century, it was regarded as stretching from north of Noyon to Calais via the whole of the Somme department and the north of the Aisne department.

During the stalemate of the Western Front during First World War, British and Empire troops manned the lines in central Picardy. In the summer of 1916, these troops fought the first Battle of the Somme in some of the deadliest and fiercest fighting of the war. (Note: By the end of November 1916, 650,000 Allies and 500,000 Germans had been killed or wounded in the Battle of the Somme.) "Roses of Picardy" was published in December and quickly became popular throughout Britain, with British soldiers singing it when they were dispatched to the Front in France and Flanders. During the First World War, the song sold at a rate of 50,000 copies of the sheet music per month, earning Haydn Wood approximately £10,000 in total (£491,298 in 2025 adjusted for inflation). Following the war, the singing of the song helped soldiers who were suffering from shell shock to regain their powers of speech.

== Lyrics ==
Postcard with the words from verse 1. c. 1916

The following lyrics are taken from the sheet music published in 1916: (Note: Weatherly died in 1929, so the lyrics for this song have been out of copyright in the UK since 1 January 2000.)

Verse 1:

She is watching by the poplars, Colinette with the sea-blue eyes,
She is watching and longing and waiting Where the long white roadway lies.
And a song stirs in the silence, As the wind in the boughs above,
She listens and starts and trembles, 'Tis the first little song of love:

Refrain

Roses are shining in Picardy, in the hush of the silver dew,
Roses are flowering in Picardy, but there's never a rose like you!
And the roses will die with the summertime, and our roads may be far apart,
But there's one rose that dies not in Picardy!
'tis the rose that I keep in my heart!

Verse 2:

And the years fly on for ever, Till the shadows veil their skies,
But he loves to hold her little hands, And look in her sea-blue eyes.
And she sees the road by the poplars, Where they met in the bygone years,
For the first little song of the roses Is the last little song she hears:

There is also a French version of the song under the title of "Dansons la Rose". The following words for its refrain are taken from the recording by Yves Montand:

Dire que cet air nous semblait vieillot,
Aujourd'hui il me semble nouveau,
Et puis surtout c'était toi et moi,
Ces deux mots ne vieillissent pas.
Souviens-toi ça parlait de la Picardie,
Et des roses qu'on trouve là-bas,
Tous les deux amoureux nous avons dansé
Sur les roses de ce temps-là.

== Recordings ==
Among the earliest commercial recordings were those by the tenors Lambert Murphy in 1917, Ernest Pike in 1918 and John McCormack in 1919. There are more than 150 recordings of the song sung in English and versions in Finnish, French, Spanish and German. There are also many instrumental versions, for example for piano, violin, string ensemble, jazz band and numerous different types of orchestra.

After the Second World War, the American jazz artist Sidney Bechet, a long-time resident in France, popularised a Swing version, and it was also recorded by the French popular singer Yves Montand. Singer Dorothy Squires recorded various versions of the song. In 1967 Vince Hill had a Top 20 hit with the song. In 2001, the folk stylist June Tabor recorded a version for her album Rosa Mundi. In 2011 the Canadian tenor Ben Heppner recorded the song for BMG and the tenor Alfie Boe recorded it for the soundtrack of the British period drama television series Downton Abbey.

"Roses of Picardy" was included on the soundtrack album of the 2015 film The Danish Girl by Tom Hooper.

== Notes and references ==
Notes
