= Haydn Wood =

English composer and violinist

- Born: 25 March 1882; Slaithwaite, England, United Kingdom
- Died: 11 March 1959 (aged 76) London, England, United Kingdom
- Genres: Ballads
- Occupations: Composer, musician
- Instrument: Violin

Haydn Wood (25 March 1882 – 11 March 1959) was a 20th-century English composer and concert violinist, best known for his 200 or so ballad style songs, including the popular Roses of Picardy.

== Biography ==
=== Early life and education ===
Haydn Wood was born in the town of Slaithwaite in the West Riding of Yorkshire. When he was three years old his family moved to the Isle of Man, an island which was often a source of inspiration for the composer. His two older brothers were also musicians: Harry (1868-1939) was a violinist, composer and conductor known as "Manxland's King of Music", while Daniel S Wood (1872-1927) was principal flautist with the London Symphony Orchestra from 1910, taught flute at the Royal Academy of Music and composed practice pieces that are still in use today.

In 1897, at the Royal College of Music, Haydn Wood studied violin with Enrique Fernández Arbós and composition with Charles Villiers Stanford. In 1901, he was soloist at a special concert commemorating the opening of the Royal College of Music's Concert Hall. The concert was attended by Joseph Joachim (who had heard him play before) and Pablo de Sarasate. They were so impressed that they sent him to Brussels for study with the renowned teacher César Thomson.

=== Career ===
He then embarked on a world tour, accompanying the Canadian soprano Dame Emma Albani and they continued their association for a further eight years.

From 1913 he toured extensively with the soprano Dorothy Court whom he married in 1909. During this period he wrote popular ballads for her to sing, and also contributed to musical comedy productions: for example, he contributed seven numbers to the musical play Tina, which opened at the Royal Adelphi Theatre in London on 2 November 1915, and wrote all the music for Cash on Delivery at the Palace Theatre in 1917. In 1916, Haydn Wood composed his most popular song, Roses of Picardy for Dorothy, reportedly selling 50,000 sheet music copies per month and earning a six figure royalty sum The song Love's Garden of Roses was written in 1915, but didn't become well known until popularised by John McCormack's recording, one of the biggest hits of 1918. Another big success came in 1923 with A Brown Bird Singing. By 1926 he was able to support himself as a full time composer for the first time.

From 1939, he served as a director of the Performing Right Society. On the occasion of his 70th birthday in 1952 he was given a full concert dedicated to his music by the BBC. His last song appears to have been Give Me Your Hand in 1957. He died in a London nursing home on 11 March 1959, at age 76.

== Works ==
Alongside his 200 or so individual songs and seven song cycles, Haydn Wood was a prolific composer of orchestral music, including 15 suites, nine rhapsodies, eight overtures, three concertante pieces and nearly 50 other works scored for a variety of forces.

His orchestral pieces were primarily of the "light music" style; a well known piece of his is the three-movement Fantasy-Concerto. Another is his London Landmarks Suite, particularly "Horse Guards, Whitehall", which was used for many years as the signature tune for the BBC Radio Series Down Your Way. In 2018 the BBC Concert Orchestra issued a new recording of the Snapshots of London Suite (1948) and premiere recordings of five other suites: Egypta (1929), Three Famous Cinema Stars (1929), Cities of Romance (1937), Manx Countryside Sketches (1943), and Royal Castles (1952). The short orchestral work Soliloquy of 1946 is a miniature of more serious intent.

The first of Haydn Wood's more extended concert pieces to gain attention was the Phantasie Quartet which won second prize in the first W W Cobbett chamber music competition of 1905 The Piano Concerto was performed at a Patron’s Fund Concert at Queen’s Hall on 14 July 1909, with soloist Ellen Edwards and Stanford conducting. It received its Proms premiere in 1915, also at Queen's Hall. His Violin Concerto of 1928 was first performed in March 1933, with soloist Antonio Brosa. Wood also wrote a Symphony (1908 - score now lost), and the Philharmonic Variations for cello and orchestra (1939).

The Isle of Man and folk tunes from the island inspired Wood's music, resulting in the compositions Manx Rhapsody (Mylecharaine), Manx Countryside Sketches, Manx Overture, and the 1933 tone poem Mannin Veen (Manx for "Dear Isle of Man"), based on four Manx folk tunes and scored for wind band. (The work is also occasionally performed in its orchestral version). Choral pieces include the short cantatas for chorus and orchestra Lochinvar (1912) and Ode to Genius (1940).
