= Lord Rawlinson =

Lord Rawlinson may refer to:

- Henry Rawlinson, 1st Baron Rawlinson (1864–1925), British military commander
- Peter Rawlinson, Baron Rawlinson of Ewell (1919–2006), British barrister and politician
