= Arthur Prothero =

British solicitor

Arthur Prothero (1905-2005) was a British solicitor. In 1948 he became one of the founders of the London Criminal Courts Solicitors' Association.

A son of John Arthur Prothero, one of the Metropolitan Police CID's 'Big Five', he is notable for instructing barrister Peter Rawlinson for the defence of Alfred Whiteway in his trial for the towpath murders. He also defended Jim Smith for the murder of a police officer in March 1960 as well as forming part of the defence team for Peter Wildeblood.
