= Keith Mant =

British forensic pathologist (1919–2000)

Arthur Keith Mant
- Born: 11 September 1919; Purley, Surrey
- Died: 11 October 2000 (aged 81)

Arthur Keith Mant (11 September 1919 – 11 October 2000) was a British forensic pathologist who headed the Special Medical Section of the British Army's War Crimes Group which investigated Nazi war crimes committed during the Second World War.

== Background and early career ==
Mant was born in Purley, London, on 11 September 1919. His father George was a solicitor who represented the tenth generation of members of the legal profession in the family. Mant was educated at Denstone College before choosing not to follow in his father's footsteps, and in 1939 joined an undergraduate course at St Mary's Hospital Medical School in London on a rugby exhibition. While studying Mant worked as an ambulance driver and plane spotter, and after graduating in 1943 started work in obstetrics and gynaecology at St Mary's. In January 1944 Mant was called up for service in the British Army, and joined the Royal Army Medical Corps. He worked in military hospitals in France and Germany after crossing the English Channel soon after D-Day in June 1944.

== War crimes investigation ==
Following the end of the Second World War, in November 1945 Mant was promoted to major and posted as officer in charge of the War Crimes Investigating Team's pathology section covering north-western Europe. His initial task was largely restricted to exhuming the bodies of Allied airmen and other airborne personnel from cemeteries and unmarked graves, concentrating on cases where the German personnel responsible were in custody or it was possible a suspect could be arrested. In 1946 he was put in charge of the Special Medical Section of the British Army's War Crimes Group. His main activities were interviewing people who had been in, or worked for, the SS and were suspected of carrying out human medical experiments in a number of concentration camps in particular Ravensbrück concentration camp. Mant took over 100 statements from staff members and inmates at Ravensbrück, which were used as evidence in later trials. A number of mass graves were also exhumed, and Mant carried out 150 autopsies on exhumed bodies. The Special Medical Section was dissolved in 1948, and Mant returned to Britain.

== Later career ==
Mant returned to work at his former department at St. Mary's, while preparing a thesis on exhumations and autopsies for his doctorate. Dr Keith Simpson, then regarded as England's up-and-coming forensic pathologist, offered Mant a job in the Department of Pathology at Guy's Hospital Medical School. Mant succeeded Simpson as head of the department when Simpson retired in 1972, and was awarded a personal chair in 1974. In addition, Mant was an honorary senior lecturer in forensic medicine at King's College Hospital Medical School and St Mary's Hospital Medical School. Mant also worked for the defence in criminal cases and as a pathologist for the Home Office, and was involved in investigations into the Teddington Towpath murders in the 1950s, the death of anti-racist campaigner Blair Peach, and the deaths of two Provisional Irish Republican Army members who died on hunger strike – Bobby Sands and Michael Gaughan. Mant often lectured in Richmond, Virginia, where he also advised novelist Patricia Cornwell on plots for her mystery novels. Mant retired from Guy's in 1984 but continued to give independent lectures and accept commissions as a pathologist, while also spending more time growing orchids and fishing for trout.

== Death ==
Mant died in Walton-on-Thames on 11 October 2000, survived by his three children, Tim, Philippa and Jonathan.
