= Herbert Hannam =

British policeman (1908–1983)

Herbert Wheeler Walter Hannam (1908 – 24 February 1983) was a British policeman within the Metropolitan Police Service. He was based at Scotland Yard where he held the rank of Detective Superintendent.

== Family ==
Hannam was born in Paddington, London in 1908, the son of printer Walter Hannam from Worcester and Elizabeth Jane from Enniskillen, County Fermanagh.

== Career ==
Hannam became famous in connection with the notorious Towpath murders in 1953. During the trial, defence counsel Peter Rawlinson cross-examined Hannam at length, opening large holes in his evidence on how the confession said to have been made by the accused was obtained. In view of police methods of the time and Hannam's book expressing the opinion that the law sometimes must be ignored by detectives, the confession Hannam alleged at trial he had obtained, in addition to the dubious account as to how the primary physical evidence against the perpetrator—the axe alleged to have been used in the murders—was conveniently discovered by police, are likely fabricated evidence against an individual whom police suspected was the perpetrator but had been unable to prove other than via illicit means.

In 1956, Hannam took charge of the investigation of the activities of John Bodkin Adams, who Hannam suspected of being a serial killer and who worked in Eastbourne. He was assisted by Detective Sergeant Charles Hewett. At an early stage in the investigation, Hannam believed he had discovered Adams' modus operandi: first to make his victims drug addicts, then to influence them to change their wills in his favour and finally to give them a lethal dose of opiates. Between August and October 1956, Hannam collected a significant number of witness statements from the nurses and relatives of Adams' deceased former patients that indicated that they had been heavily drugged by Adams, had been injected with unknown substances and had become comatose or unresponsive, and he confided to a reporter that he was convinced that Adams was a serial killer who had killed fourteen people. However, his Chief Superintendent and divisional Commander initially considered that his case was speculative, based on rumour and could not be proved.

Hannam's aristocratic air led to the press dubbing him "The Count". Despite opposition from the BMA and claims of lack of cooperation by the DPP and the Eastbourne police, he produced a file of evidence which he considered was sufficient to charge Adams on four counts of murder.

Adams was indicted on only two counts, the murders of Edith Alice Morrell and Gertrude Hullett. He was tried for the former in 1957 and found not guilty. The Attorney General entered the unprecedented plea of nolle prosequi regarding Mrs Hullett rather than accepting a not guilty verdict. Patrick Devlin, the trial judge, later termed this "an abuse of process", done because the prosecution’s case was deficient, which left Adams under the suspicion that there might have been some truth in talk of mass murder.

Hannam was said to have expressed concern about high-level political, medical and judicial interference in the investigation and the subsequent prosecution, although the statement about political interference was made by a former colleague and not published until long after Hannam's death.

The Metropolitan Police conducted an internal investigation into Hannam's conduct during his investigation, and also studied the relationship between Hannam and the press in depth. The results were never made public, but a year later his police career ended, and he was later employed in a private security agency.
