= Towpath murders =

1953 double murder in Richmond, London

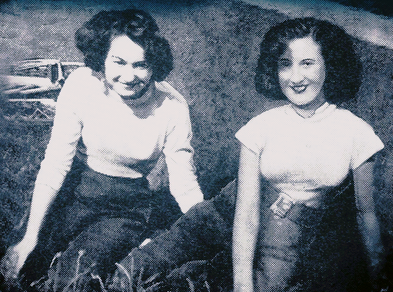
- Christine Reed (left) and Barbara Songhurst, c. 1953
- Location: 51.43404°N 0.32704°W; Teddington Lock, Richmond upon Thames, London, England
- Date: 31 May 1953 c. 11:25 p.m.
- Weapons: Axe; Gurkha knife
- Deaths: Christine Rose Reed (18); Barbara Songhurst (16)
- Perpetrator: Alfred Charles Whiteway (21)
- Motive: Sexual sadism; Rape; Elimination
- Sentence: Death (2 November 1953); Executed (22 December 1953)

The towpath murders (also known as the Thames Towpath Murders and the Teddington Towpath Murders) are a double murder committed upon a section of towpath between Teddington Lock and Eel Pie Island in Richmond upon Thames, London, (Note: At the time of the crimes, the London Borough of Richmond upon Thames did not exist; the location was part of Surrey, but would become part of London in 1965 via a merger of three Surrey and Middlesex counties.) England, on 31 May 1953. The victims were two teenage girls, Christine Reed and Barbara Songhurst, who were ambushed by a lone individual as they cycled to their respective homes in Hampton Hill and Teddington. Both girls were overpowered, then violently raped and murdered before their bodies were discarded in the River Thames. The perpetrator, 21-year-old Alfred Charles Whiteway, was convicted of both murders in a trial held at the Old Bailey before Mr Justice Hilbery that October; he was hanged at Wandsworth Prison on 22 December 1953.

The murders of Christine Reed and Barbara Songhurst became known as the "towpath murders" due to a towpath being both the location the victims were last seen alive and the site of their murder. The forensic methods used to link the perpetrator to both the victims and the weapons used in the commission of the crime were described as "one of Scotland Yard's most notable triumphs in a century".

== Background ==
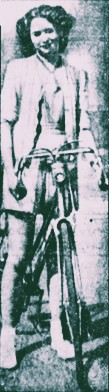
Christine Reed, c. spring 1953

On the afternoon of Saturday 30 May 1953, 16-year-old Barbara Songhurst informed her parents of her intention to cycle from her Teddington home to spend the evening with her friend, 18-year-old Christine Reed, who lived in nearby Hampton Hill. Although Reed was two years older than Songhurst and the girls hailed from differing social backgrounds, (Note: Reed hailed from a working class family. A 2 June 1953 interview with her mother quotes her as describing her daughter as being of low intelligence and illiterate, yet markedly beautiful and compassionate. The same article describes Songhurst as markedly intelligent, vivacious and the middle of nine children born to a lower middle class couple.) the two were best friends, having become acquainted through their shared love of jazz music and dancing approximately one year prior. Both also enjoyed cycling, and had scrupulously saved their money to purchase their own bicycles: Reed had purchased a bicycle with money saved from her earnings as a machinist earlier in 1953; Songhurst had also recently purchased a new Phillips sports bicycle for £17 (the equivalent of approximately £416 as of 2026) with money earned via her employment as a chemist's shop assistant.

Later that afternoon, Reed, Songhurst and a friend named Joy Woolveridge cycled to a bebop concert to be held at York House, Twickenham, where several of their friends were also socialising. Several hours later, Reed and Woolveridge left the premises to visit a nearby café as Songhurst danced with an American soldier based at Bushy Park; she later joined her friends at the café.

The three left the café shortly before midnight; Woolveridge returned to her own home as Reed and Songhurst cycled about three miles to Reed's home in Roy Grove, Hampton Hill where, by prearrangement, Songhurst spent the night.

=== 31 May 1953 ===
At 10 a.m. on 31 May, Reed and Songhurst ate breakfast after Reed had redressed into a yellow buttoned cardigan, dark blue serge trousers, white socks and black block-heeled shoes; they then returned to Songhurst's home, where Barbara changed from her dancing clothing into a short grey jacket, tartan shirt, blue jeans, a distinctive waist-high, wide black belt with a large clasp buckle, white socks and black shoes before informing her mother she and Reed intended to cycle to Brighton. That afternoon, the girls returned to Reed's home before—at approximately 7:15 p.m.—cycling to a section of the River Thames towpath between Teddington Lock and Petersham, where several teenagers they both knew were camping on the opposite side of the river. The two spent several hours at this location, with the final ninety minutes including a game of Catch and Kiss.

Reed and Songhurst left their friends at approximately 11:10 p.m. As Songhurst's new bicycle was not fitted with lighting, one of the male campers, Peter Warren, lent her his cycle lamp; both girls agreed to return the lamp the following day. Several campers then watched the friends cycle in the direction of Teddington Lock, where they were to cross an iron bridge en route to their homes. The last individuals to see the girls alive were a young courting couple sitting alongside the towpath.

== Discoveries ==
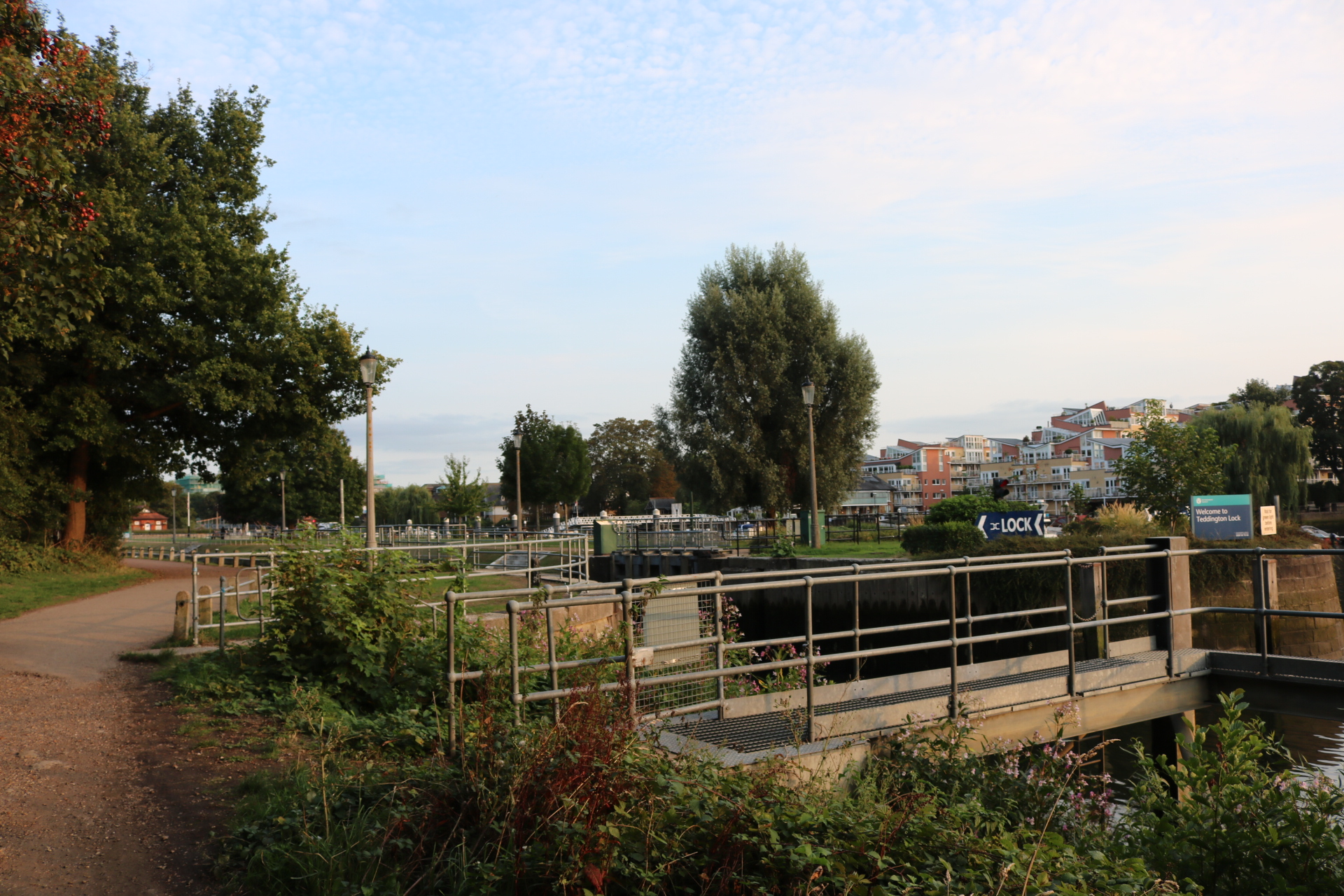
The location at Teddington Lock close to where Reed and Songhurst were attacked and murdered

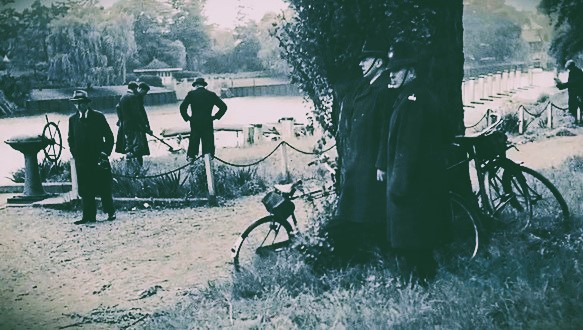
Police officers search the area surrounding the section of towpath where the body of Barbara Songhurst had evidently been dragged along the ground and either placed or thrown into the Thames. 1 June 1953.

At 8:15 a.m. on 1 June, a man named George Coster discovered the body of a teenage girl floating face-down in the Thames close to Eel Pie Island as he cycled to work; he immediately notified authorities, who instructed the Marine Policing Unit to retrieve the body, which was then taken to Richmond mortuary.

Extensive injuries upon the body indicated the decedent had been violently murdered. A search of the vicinity revealed the girl had evidently been attacked approximately half a mile from the location of her discovery at a location within the Ham Lands nature reserve known locally as Lovers' Glade. This site was approximately 400 yards from a lock within a secluded section of a secondary towpath which runs parallel to the main towpath by the Thames and is surrounded by shrubbery, trees and bushes. At this location, two large pools of blood were discovered in addition to numerous blood spatterings upon sections of shrubbery and ample sections of churned soil indicative of a ferocious physical struggle between the decedent and her murderer. A forensic analysis of the two pools of blood revealed one pool—located closer toward the centre of the towpath—to be type A and the other type O. The decedent in the river had type A blood. Furthermore, two pairs of women's shoes—one pair two sizes larger than the other—were recovered near a tall poplar tree 5 feet (1.5 m) from the crime scene, indicating more than one victim.

=== First autopsy ===
The decedent's autopsy was conducted by pathologist Keith Mant, who described the victim as a brunette, Caucasian female in her mid-teens and 5 ft (150 cm) in height who had died approximately eight hours prior to her discovery. She had received a deep semicircular laceration to her left cheek, which had fractured her cheekbone in addition to three stab wounds to the back—each of which had punctured her lungs and had penetrated her body up to nine inches in depth and would have killed her within three to eight minutes. She had also received a laceration to her scalp, a skull fracture, and numerous scratches and bruises on her legs likely sustained as she fought her assailant. This theory was further supported by several fibers sourcing from a man's sports jacket recovered from beneath her fingernails. The girl had also been violently raped. The weapons used were a distinctive Gurkha knife with a double-edged, one-inch-wide blade and a small hatchet and that the perpetrator had likely been "a man of unusual strength".

Songhurst's parents formally identified their daughter on the afternoon of her discovery; her mother informed police she had last seen her with Christine Reed on Sunday morning and that she had assumed her daughter had simply chosen to spend the previous evening at Reed's home, but had expected her home that day as she had been looking forward to the upcoming Coronation and had entered a bathing beauty contest in celebration to be held the following evening. She had only learned her daughter was missing when she failed to show up for work that morning, and had also discovered from Reed's parents that their daughter was also missing.

=== Dredging of River Thames ===
Formally establishing Songhurst's identity and learning her close friend was also missing led investigators to conclude Reed had most likely also been murdered. This conclusion was supported by the discovery of articles of Reed's clothing alongside garments belonging to Songhurst at the site where two individuals had evidently been violently assaulted and murdered. As such, a decision was made to dredge a three-mile section of the River Thames between Teddington Lock and Richmond.

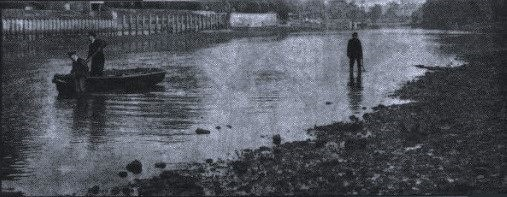
Investigators search the riverbed of the Thames following the discovery of the body of Barbara Songhurst

Shortly after the Port of London Authority opened the sluices at Teddington Lock on 2 June, an electromagnet located Reed's distinctive blue-and-cream BSA bicycle beneath the river approximately one hundred yards from the site where the girls had evidently been attacked. (Note: Investigators recovered a clear fingerprint upon the crossbar of Reed's bicycle; the individual whom this fingerprint belonged to was subsequently eliminated from police enquiries.) A distinctive knife was also recovered from the riverbed, although this weapon was later determined to be unrelated to the case.

=== Second autopsy ===
On the afternoon of 6 June, Reed's partially-clothed body was found submerged close to Glover's Island, less than one mile from Richmond Bridge. Her autopsy revealed she had received six stab wounds to her back, six stab wounds to her chest and one stab wound above her left wrist. One of the stab wounds to Reed's back had pierced her lung, while four of the wounds to her chest had entered her heart. Four deep laceration wounds were discovered upon Reed's skull, which had been fractured in two places and, like Songhurst, Reed had been violently raped. Reed's forearms and hands also bore numerous lacerations and bruises evidently inflicted as she attempted to defend herself. All the injuries had been inflicted with a hatchet and either a stiletto or Gurkha knife.

The pathologist who conducted Reed's autopsy placed the time of death as occurring between five and six days previous; he was also able to determine she had still been alive when thrown into the river.

== Investigation ==
The murders of Reed and Songhurst received considerable media attention, and over 200 investigators were assigned to the manhunt to apprehend the perpetrator or perpetrators. The individual assigned command of the investigation was Detective Chief Inspector (DCI) Herbert Hannam, who initially believed the double murder had been committed by two men but soon revised his opinion to conclude the murders had been committed by a single individual. Numerous television and radio appeals encouraged potential eyewitnesses or others with information to assist in the intense police manhunt; these appeals were also broadcast in all cinemas within a ten-mile radius of Teddington Lock. A Sunday newspaper also offered a £1,000 reward to any individual who could provide information leading to the apprehension of the murderer.

Hannam established both girls had been responsible, family-oriented and virtuous, with no known enemies. Although both had enjoyed the company and attention of males, neither had been promiscuous, and both had been virgins prior to their rape. All individuals known to the girls—including the three camping teenage boys they had specifically cycled to meet on the date of their murder—were eliminated from police enquiries. As Songhurst was known to have frequently danced with United States Air Force servicemen stationed at Bushy Park, all personnel at the base were questioned and likewise eliminated. Over 1,600 individuals would be questioned and eliminated throughout the enquiry, and several known sex offenders interrogated and eliminated as suspects.

Both the time at which the murders had occurred and the somewhat secluded location of the crime scene led investigators to conclude the perpetrator was most likely either local to the area or someone familiar with local transport networks. Furthermore, as both victims had been riding bicycles at the time of their initial assault, and the wounds to both were similar in nature in addition to having been applied with considerable force, Hannam believed the murderer had likely incapacitated one victim by either stunning her with, or throwing the axe at her head or torso as she cycled along the towpath before rapidly overpowering the other victim—possibly by throwing a knife at her back.

Initial public appeals resulted in the courting couple whom the girls had cycled past coming forward to inform police they had sat on the bank of the River Thames from 10 p.m. until midnight on the date of the murders; both revealed they had heard the male campers briefly chat with, then say "Goodbye", to the girls before both had cycled past them in the direction of Teddington Lock shortly before midnight. One of these individuals had heard a brief, high-pitched scream shortly thereafter, but had paid no attention to the noise.

=== Further developments ===
On 12 June, a 46-year-old woman was approached by a young man on a bicycle ostensibly asking for directions to The Holly Tree pub as she walked her dog in Windsor Great Park. As she attempted to describe the directions for this man she was dragged into nearby undergrowth at knifepoint and sexually assaulted, though not raped. (Note: The victim of this sexual assault managed to deter her attacker from actually raping her by continually talking to him in a non-aggressive manner, then offering him the contents of her purse.) The modus operandi of this attack had been similar to the rape of a 14-year-old girl in the Oxshott Heath and Woods on 24 May. In this instance, the schoolgirl had first been rendered semi-conscious by a blow to the head from the flat edge of an axe-like instrument, with her assailant having crept upon her from behind. She had also been walking a dog when attacked, and her assailant had been riding a bicycle. As such, investigators were unable to discount a link between the two cases, or rule out the possibility the perpetrator had also murdered Reed and Songhurst.

Enquiries into the rape of the schoolgirl produced an eyewitness who had seen a young, dark-haired man wearing brown leather gloves and blue overalls following a schoolgirl from a distance as she walked across a heath at the approximate time of the assault. Another witness had seen a man matching this description waiting for a bus close to Oxshott Heath and Woods shortly after the rape had occurred; this individual also added the man had a cleft chin. A facial composite of this individual was created and extensively distributed throughout the media.

Several days after the facial composite was released to the media, on 17 June, two builders spotted a man matching this description sitting on a tree stump alongside a parked bicycle close to Oxshott railway station. Both recognised him as a man they had previously worked with: Alfred Charles Whiteway. He was briefly questioned by two policeman before undergoing formal questioning at Kingston police station, but was soon released as he was not considered to closely resemble the facial composite of the suspect.

== Arrest ==
=== Initial charges ===
On 28 June, Whiteway was arrested by the Surrey Constabulary; this arrest was in relation to the sexual assault he had committed in Windsor Great Park sixteen days previous. Both the victim of this sexual assault and the man who had seen a suspicious individual waiting for a bus close to Oxshott Heath and Woods shortly after the 24 May rape of the schoolgirl positively identified Whiteway when asked to view an identity parade. A search of Whiteway's home revealed a pair of recently-washed crêpe-soled shoes which he admitted habitually wearing; forensic testing revealed traces of human blood in the seam and eyelets of the right shoe.

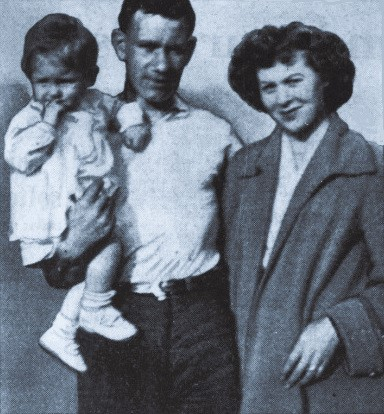
Whiteway, pictured with his wife and infant daughter, c. spring 1953

Whiteway was remanded in custody in relation to both sex attacks on 1 July, having admitted to robbing one victim but denying any involvement in either of the sexual assaults, with his wife also corroborating his alibi for the date of the murders. Upon learning of these developments and the fact the 21-year-old labourer and father-of-one had recently separated from his pregnant wife, was a body-building enthusiast, was also known to practice knife throwing as a hobby, had been questioned by police the previous year in relation to a physical assault upon a young woman whom he had struck across the head with a section of lead pipe, and lived at an address less than one mile from the scene of the murders, DCI Hannam chose to question Whiteway with regards to his whereabouts on 31 May.

=== Further questioning and developments ===
Several days after Whiteway was remanded in custody at HM Prison Brixton, he was questioned by DCI Hannam in relation to both the sexual assaults and the towpath murders. On this occasion, Whiteway gradually admitted responsibility for the sexual assaults but denied any responsibility for the murders, although he admitted to having known Barbara Songhurst and her family since approximately 1943. In reference to his movements on the afternoon of 31 May, Whiteway stated that, as he had typically done "most nights" since their amicable recent separation due to their difficulty in finding a household, he had spent the afternoon in the company of his wife, Nellie May, and baby daughter, Christina, from approximately 7:30 p.m. to between 11 and 11:30 p.m. On the date in question he, his wife and child had visited Canbury Gardens before returning to her parents' Kingston upon Thames home, where he drank a cup of tea on the doorstep before cycling alone to his parents' Teddington home via Kingston Bridge, arriving home shortly before midnight.

In this initial interview with DCI Hannam, Whiteway insisted he could pinpoint the actual time of his retiring to bed in the early hours of 1 June as he had had to adjust the time of a "slow clock" in his bedroom to display 12:15 a.m. before doing so.

When questioned with regards to an earlier admission he had owned a small axe, Whiteway first claimed the tool was in the cupboard of his wife's parents' home before admitting he had discreetly hidden the tool in his overalls before, in a moment of opportunism, placing the item beneath the driver's seat of a police car following his 17 June arrest and questioning at Kingston police station.

Prior to this admission, a Kingston police officer named Arthur Cosh had discovered a small axe concealed beneath the driver's seat of a police car while cleaning the vehicle on the morning of 18 June. (Note: Cosh had not been one of the officers who had arrested and questioned Whiteway the previous day.) As no member of the public had enquired about the tool for several days, the constable had taken the tool home and had been using the instrument to chop wood in his basement; he later retrieved the axe from his home and presented the tool to Hannam upon learning of the item's significance in relation to the murder investigation. A forensic examination of the tool yielded no physical evidence linking the item to Whiteway, although the axe's dimensions perfectly matched wounds inflicted to both murder victims.

== Confession ==
On 30 July, DCI Hannam again interviewed Whiteway, presenting the axe. According to Hannam, upon viewing it, Whiteway almost immediately stated: "Blimey, that's it. It was ... sharp when I did it. I sharpened it with a file." He then grinned when Hannam also displayed his Gurkha knife before further elaborating: "It's all over. You know well I done it, eh? [My shoe] buggered me .... I'm mental. I must have a fucking woman. I can't stop myself."

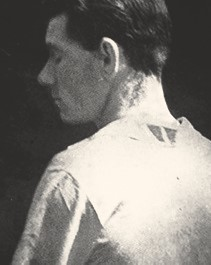
Whiteway, seen here after he was formally charged with the murders of Reed and Songhurst

In his account of the night of 31 May, Whiteway claimed to have initially seen only one cyclist, whom he "bashed about the head and she went down like a log"; he then heard another female—whom he had not initially seen—"scream out down by the lock" before approaching her and "[shutting] her up" with his weapons. Emphasising the second of the girls he had attacked had been Barbara Songhurst—whom he had known and would undoubtedly have been able to identify him as she had witnessed him striking Reed before approaching her—Whiteway stressed his attack would not have been fatal but for this fact. (Note: Whiteway's family had formerly been next-door neighbours and close acquaintances of the Songhurst family, with Whiteway's mother and the mother of Barbara Songhurst being best friends when both families resided on Sydney Road, Teddington, prior to the Songhursts relocating to nearby Princes Road in the mid-1940s.)

=== Formal murder charges ===
On 20 August, initial pretrial hearings pertaining to Whiteway's alleged culpability in relation to the murders of Reed and Songhurst resulted in his being remanded in custody until 27 August. He was formally charged with both murders on 18 September. When asked if he wished to speak at this committal hearing, Whiteway stated, "I have denied the charges" before his solicitor informed the court his client intended to reserve his right to defend himself at a later date.

As Whiteway's blood type was determined to be the same as Christine Reed, greater physical evidence existed to connect him with the murder of Barbara Songhurst; as such, the Crown subsequently opted for him to be tried solely for her murder.

== Trial ==
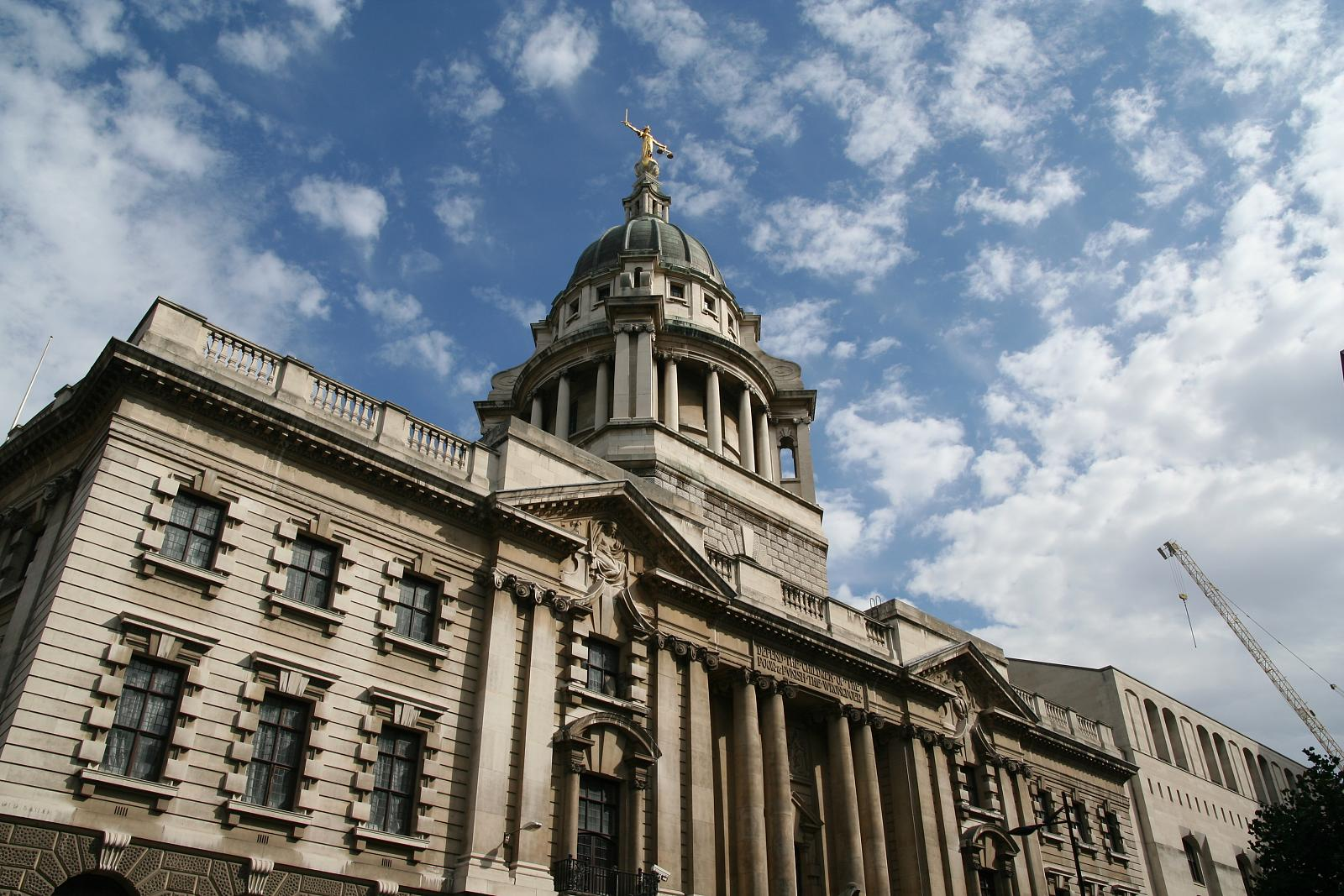
The Old Bailey, London. Whiteway was brought to trial at this courthouse on 26 October 1953

Whiteway was brought to trial at the Old Bailey for the murder of Barbara Songhurst on 26 October 1953. He was tried before Mr Justice Hilbery. The prosecution consisted of Christmas Humphreys and J. F. Claxton; the defence consisted of solicitor Arthur Prothero, who instructed Peter Rawlinson (then a relatively junior barrister) and Michael Havers. Whiteway pleaded not guilty to the charge.

In his opening statement to the jury, Humphreys stated the prosecution intended to prove Whiteway had committed Songhurst's murder, but they did not need to prove his motive as to why. The defence outlined their opening statement by claiming Whiteway had an alibi accounting for his whereabouts at the time the murders were committed and alleging much of the evidence to be produced by the prosecution had been fabricated by police.

=== Testimony ===
The primary evidence against Whiteway was his alleged signed confession, which was introduced into evidence in the opening days of the trial and which DCI Hannam testified "unlocked the whole crime". (Note: Prior to DCI Hannam being sworn to testify, Judge Hilbery overruled a submission by the defence counsel that the statements taken by Hannam should be ruled as inadmissible evidence.) Hannam testified as to both the circumstances surrounding the obtaining of the confession and the actual contents, also alleging that Whiteway had said to him he would later claim his confession was "all lies".

Upon cross-examination, Hannam's testimony pertaining to Whiteway's expletive-laden confession and police investigative procedures was subjected to intense scrutiny and criticism by Peter Rawlinson. Over the course of two days, Rawlinson successfully outlined several discrepancies and inaccuracies in Hannam's accounts, including official records of interviews in which Whiteway had told police he did not know what he was actually being asked to sign when instructed to add his signature to the alleged confession before suggesting to the jury police had wilfully "fictionalised and manipulated" his client's signed confession. (Note: Although contemporary press reports of Whiteway's trial were critical of the defence's insinuation that police had fabricated evidence against Whiteway, later revelations of contemporary police tactics, and Hannam's subsequent admissions expressing his belief that the law sometimes must be ignored by detectives, have led many to believe Whiteway's confession had indeed been fabricated.) In a direct reference to Hannam's claims to the contrary and which Hannam stated he was "pleased to deny", Rawlinson alleged Hannam was ultimately "swearing away [Whiteway's] life." (Note: Prior to and throughout his trial, Whiteway insisted to both his solicitors and his family the written confession DCI Hannam presented in evidence at his trial had been fabricated by police; he would continue to maintain this claim until his death.)

The physical evidence introduced into evidence included the axe used in the commission of the murders, with Keith Mant testifying the laceration wound to Songhurst's cheek was consistent with having been inflicted by an axe of the size of the one presented into evidence. Mant also testified the dimensions of the flat edge of the weapon also perfectly matched the fractures inflicted to her skull before stating one of the stab wounds inflicted to Songhurst's back would have been almost immediately fatal.

Dr Lewis Nickolls, Director of the Metropolitan Police Laboratory, also testified to having discovered traces of human blood upon a shoe belonging to Whiteway. Nickolls testified the positive reaction was strongest around the stitching of the sole and the stitching of the eyelets, indicating the shoe had either been washed or rubbed upon extremely wet grass.

Officer Arthur Cosh also testified to the circumstances surrounding his discovering the axe alleged by the prosecution to have been used in the murders beneath the driver's seat of a police vehicle on 18 June and having later taken the tool home to chop wood, only to discover the weapon's significance in a widely publicised murder case the following month and return the item to Kingston police station. When asked to explain his actions, Cosh replied: "The practice among drivers is that anything found in the car is claimed by the driver finding it." When asked if he had discovered a jemmy hidden in the car would he have taken the item home, Cosh replied, "No."

Cosh was then subjected to an intense cross-examination by Rawlinson, who poured scorn on his claims regarding his discovery of the axe and subsequent actions culminating in his bringing the item to investigators after Whiteway's arrest and at a time when police were unable to locate the murder weapon. Midway through Rawlinson's questioning, Cosh fainted.

Whiteway's wife also testified her husband had been drinking tea with her on the porch of her home at approximately 11:30 p.m. on 31 May, when the victims were last seen alive, adding her parents—who made no secret of their dislike of Whiteway—had refused to allow him into their home. Her testimony was followed by Whiteway's uncle, Charles Langston, who stated that Whiteway had returned home at 11:30 p.m. by "[my] clock", which had been ten or fifteen minutes slow. Also to testify was Whiteway's sister, who agreed a similar weapon had been stored beneath a cupboard in her parents' home and typically used to chop firewood, although she insisted the item had been missing for "five or six weeks" at the time police first questioned her.

=== Defendant's testimony ===
Whiteway himself gave evidence in his defence. To both prosecution and defence counsel, he denied having ever confessed to the murders and insisted he had only applied his signature to one caution. He further denied Hannam's allegation that he had been "shocked and trembling" when informed of investigators having discovered traces of blood upon one of his shoes and emphasised he "did not know" the actual text content of the sole document he had signed—only that Hannam had told him to sign "a page with writing on it".

When questioned as to the bloodstains upon his crêpe-soled shoes, Whiteway insisted he had cut himself while shaving three weeks before the murders, and had also cut himself in his employment as a labourer at approximately the same time. Humphreys pressed Whiteway on these claims; in response, Whiteway admitted he could not account for precisely how the blood had actually been discovered upon this item of clothing.

=== Closing arguments ===
In his closing argument to the jury, Christmas Humphreys referenced the confessions given by Whiteway upon learning of the police's mounting evidence against him; he also described the defence's contention police had obtained these confessions via deceit or forgery as "the most tremendous attack [of this nature] ever made within a British court." In reference to the actual motive for Songhurst's murder, Humphreys alleged Whiteway had chosen to murder his victim to prevent her from identifying him as her assailant, stating: "He is raping these girls; his face is inches from theirs. [Songhurst] might know his face. He has to kill her; otherwise she is going to say, 'It was Alfie Whiteway who raped me last night.'"

Peter Rawlinson delivered the defence's closing argument. Rawlinson alleged the actual perpetrator had been a lone male on foot who had been seen by several witnesses loitering in the vicinity of the murders before their commission; he also emphasised that Songhurst's bicycle had never been found, and that, as corroborated by family members, Whiteway had been riding his own bicycle on the afternoon and evening of the murders, and as such, the actual perpetrator must have fled the scene on Songhurst's bicycle.

In reference to the time the murders had occurred, Rawlinson stressed that, unlike Whiteway's wife, uncle, and his wife's parents, most eyewitnesses relied on memory as to the time the girls had last been seen alive and the brief, high-pitched scream had been heard. He speculated the murders may possibly have occurred as late as 1 a.m. when—as corroborated by several individuals—Whiteway had long since returned home. Referencing Songhurst's autopsy report, Rawlinson further stated pathologist Keith Mant could only estimate she had died "approximately eight hours" prior to her discovery at 8:15 a.m. on 1 June.

Discussing the savagery of the murders, Rawlinson also referenced the fact no bloodstains had been discovered on any of Whiteway's clothes save for one shoe, which his client had stated sourced from either his shaving or his menial labour. He then discussed the circumstances surrounding the axe presented in evidence against his client, which had been conveniently and dubiously discovered at a time police desperately sought one or both of the murder weapons, and his client's alleged confession, which Rawlinson again alleged had been fabricated by police and signed by his client through trickery or force. Rawlinson concluded his closing argument by urging the jury to find his client not guilty.

How little did those two light-hearted young girls, in the very springtime of their lives ... think that was the last hour they [actually] had to live, and what awful death awaited them a little further along that path.

— Mr Justice Hilbery, sentencing Whiteway to death for the murder of Barbara Songhurst. 2 November 1953

== Conviction ==
The jury retired to consider their verdict on the afternoon of 2 November; they deliberated for forty-eight minutes before announcing, at 3:25 p.m., that they had reached their verdict: Whiteway was found guilty of Songhurst's murder. He closed his eyes and swayed slightly as the sentence was passed, then left the courtroom in silence.

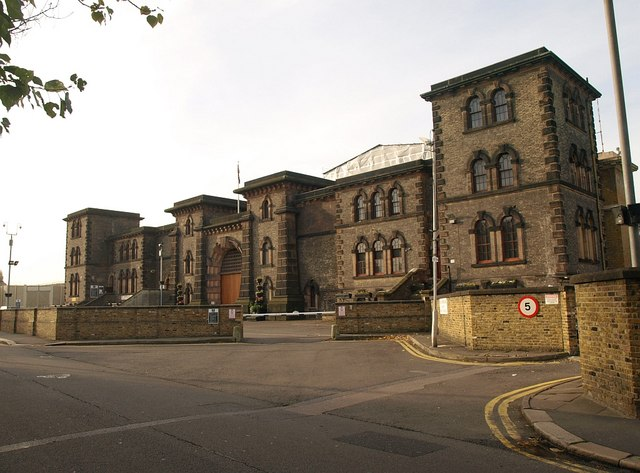
Wandsworth Prison. Whiteway was executed within the grounds on 22 December 1953.

After Whiteway had left the dock, Judge Hilbery ordered that charges against Whiteway for the murder of Christine Reed and the two separate charges of rape and assault with attempt to rape and robbery for which he had initially been arrested lie on file.

=== Appeal and execution ===
Whiteway did appeal his sentence; his appeal contended the trial judge had wrongly permitted the fact he had previously been arrested upon a charge of attempting to rape a 15-year-old girl to be introduced into evidence at his trial. The appeal was heard by the Lord Chief Justice (Lord Goddard), Mr. Justice Sellers and Mr. Justice Barry on 7 December, but was rejected the same day, with Lord Goddard describing the case as one of the "most brutal and horrifying crimes" he had encountered in many years of service and directly quoting sections of Whiteway's confession upon announcing the upholding of the sentence. Upon hearing the rejection of her husband's appeal, Whiteway's 18-year-old wife burst into tears and had to be assisted from the courtroom.

Alfred Whiteway was hanged at Wandsworth Prison on 22 December 1953. His executioner was Albert Pierrepoint. One of Whiteway's last acts before walking to the gallows was to hand a Christmas card to a prison officer, asking it be posted to his wife and infant daughters after his execution.

== Media ==
=== Literature ===
- Day, Jeremy (1994). "The Towpath Sex Maniac". Killers (4). London, England: Nexus Media Limited: 22–32. ISSN 1352-5654.
- Smyth, Frank; Williams, Paul (1993). "The Towpath Murders". Real-Life Crimes. No. 23. London, England: Eaglemoss Publications Ltd. ISBN 978-1-856-29960-2.
- Wade, Stephen (2018). The Count of Scotland Yard: The Controversial Life and Cases of DCS Herbert Hannam. Amberley Publishing. ISBN 978-1-445-68102-3.

=== Television ===
- The true crime documentary series Murder Maps has broadcast an episode focusing on the crimes of Alfred Whiteway. Titled The Towpath Murders and presented by Nicholas Day, this 45-minute episode was first broadcast on 26 October 2017.

== See also ==
- Capital punishment in the United Kingdom
- False evidence
- HM Prison Wandsworth
- List of executioners
- List of solved missing person cases: 1950–1999
- Sexual sadism

== Cited works and further reading ==
- Bell, Amy (2014). Murder Capital: Suspicious Deaths in London, 1933–53. Manchester: Manchester University Press. ISBN 978-0-719-09197-1.
- Chibnall, Steven (2013). Law-and-Order News: An Analysis of Crime Reporting in the British Press. Oxfordshire: Taylor & Francis. ISBN 978-1-136-42249-2.
- Cullen, Pamela V. (2006). A Stranger in Blood: The Case Files on Dr John Bodkin Adams. London: Elliott & Thompson. ISBN 978-1-904-02719-5.
- Dobbs, Gary (2020). A Date with the Hangman: A History of Capital Punishment in Britain. Yorkshire: Pen & Sword Books. ISBN 978-1-526-74744-0.
- Fielding, Steven (2008). Pierrepoint: A Family of Executioners. London: John Blake Publishing Ltd. ISBN 978-1-843-58563-3.
- Forester, Chris (2006). Journal of the Police History Society. Surrey: The Police History Society. ISSN 0269-8617.
- Gaute, J. H. H. (1991). The New Murderers' Who's Who. New York: Dorset Press. ISBN 978-0-747-23270-4.
- Gaute, J. H. H.; Odell, Robin (1986). Murder Whereabouts. Edinburgh: Harrap Publishing Group Limited. ISBN 978-0-245-54258-9.
- Gordon, Michael (2018). Murder Files from Scotland Yard and the Black Museum. North Carolina: Exposit Books. ISBN 978-1-476-67254-0.
- Gribble, Leonard Reginald (1974). Famous Stories of the Murder Squad. Nevada: Barker Publishing. ISBN 978-0-213-16519-2.
- Innes, Brian (2000). Bodies of Evidence. London: Amber Books Ltd. ISBN 978-1-856-05623-6.
- Jacobs, Thomas Curtis Hicks (1956). Aspects of Murder. United Kingdom: St. Paul. ASIN B000PCTPAY.
- Jerath, Bal; Jerath, Rajinder (2020). Homicide: A Bibliography, Second Edition. Oxfordshire: Taylor & Francis. ISBN 978-1-000-14243-3.
- Kirby, Dick (2020). Scotland Yard's Murder Squad. Yorkshire: Pen & Sword Books. ISBN 978-1-526-76536-9.
- Koestler, Arthur (2019). Reflections on Hanging. Georgia: University of Georgia Press. ISBN 978-0-820-36974-7.
- Kuppner, Frank (1994). Something Very Like Murder. London: Polygon Publishing. ISBN 978-0-748-66181-7.
- Lane, Brian (1995). Chronicle of 20th Century Murder. Bournemouth: Select Editions. ISBN 978-1-852-27436-8.
- Lucas, Norman (1974). The Sex Killers. London: W. H. Allen & Co. ISBN 978-0-491-01481-6.
- McCrery, Nigel (2013). Silent Witnesses: A History of Forensic Science. London: Random House Books. ISBN 978-1-847-94683-6.
- Morris, Jim (2015). The Who's Who of British Crime: In the Twentieth Century. Stroud: Amberley Publishing. ISBN 978-1-445-63924-6.
- Powell, Gary (2017). Death Diary: A Year of London Murder, Execution, Terrorism and Treason. Stroud: Amberley Publishing. ISBN 978-1-445-66503-0.
- Smyth, Frank; Williams, Paul (1993). "The Towpath Murders". Real-Life Crimes. No. 23. London, England: Eaglemoss Publications Ltd. ISBN 978-1-856-29960-2.
- Traini, Robert (1960). Murder for Sex, and Cases of Manslaughter Under the New Act. United Kingdom: William Kimber & Co Ltd. ASIN B002A8XQA6.
- Trow, M. J. (2023). The Hagley Wood Murder. Yorkshire: Pen & Sword Books. ISBN 978-1-399-06647-1.
- Ullyett, Kenneth (1963). Crime Out of Hand. London: M. Joseph Books. ASIN B0000CLXO4.
- Van der Kiste, John (2012). Surrey Murders. Stroud: History Press. ISBN 978-0-752-48393-1.
- Wilson, Colin; Pitman, Patricia (1986) [1962]. Encyclopedia of Murder. New York: Putnam Publishing. ISBN 978-0-330-28300-7.
- Winn, Godfrey (1954). The Queen's Country Women. London: Hutchinson & Co. ASIN B000XSWXJA.
- Yount, Lisa (2007). Forensic Science: From Fibers to Fingerprints. New York City: Chelsea House Publishing. ISBN 978-1-604-13061-4.
