= Murder of Joy Morgan =

2018 crime in Hertfordshire, England

Joy Morgan
- Joy Morgan
- Born: 12 February 1998; Hertfordshire, England
- Died: c. 26 December 2018
- Education: University of Hertfordshire
- Known for: Homicide victim

Joy Morgan (12 February 1998 – c. 26 December 2018) was a British university student who was murdered by a fellow member of her church. Morgan was reported as last seen on the 26 December 2018, at her local church in East London at a Feast Celebration, but was not officially reported as missing to the Metropolitan Police Service until the 7 February 2019. Shohfah-El Israel, who attended the same church as Morgan, was found guilty of her murder on the 5 August 2019. Morgan's body was later discovered, despite Israel's refusal to reveal its location.

== Background ==
=== Early life ===
Joy Morgan was born on 12 February 1998 and lived in South London with her family in her early childhood. Morgan's family struggled financially whilst she was growing up. Morgan's mother, Carol, often worked 12-15 hour shifts as a care worker. Morgan's uncle died of cancer in 2006 and later in 2012, her stepfather had also died of the same disease. In 2014, Morgan's father committed suicide. Some time after, Morgan began studying midwifery at the University of Hertfordshire.

=== Membership of Israel United in Christ ===
Shortly after the death of Morgan's father, she started to become interested in the church organisation Israel United in Christ after coming across it on the internet. It was reported that after joining the church it became a big part of Morgan's life and she started to distance herself from her family. Two weeks before her disappearance, Morgan described the church in a video posted on the church's social media as "like the best family that I've ever had".

In January 2016, Morgan joined the UK branch of the organisation, which is based in Ilford, London. Her family reported that their relationship with Morgan became increasingly distant due to the teachings of the church. Morgan started to target and mistreat her younger mixed-race sister, referring to her as a "demon of white-men". The prosecutor claimed the church has "a very particular and clear social hierarchy, with women at the church having no ranks and being referred to as 'sisters'. Women at the church are also required to call all men 'sir'."

Morgan was heavily invested in the church. Lead Prosecutor, Mark Fenhalls, stated that Morgan "was a mainstay of the congregation, worshipping regularly and helping run the children's group". Morgan's mother Carol claimed that her daughter had been turned into a racist by the church, and called the church a cult. The US-based Southern Poverty Law Center, describes the church as a “hate group” and “a black nationalist group”. However, the church denies these claims.

== Disappearance and investigation ==
=== Initial disappearance ===
Morgan was last seen alive on 26 December 2018 at a church celebration in Ilford. On the 28 December, her phone number was removed from a church social media chat group. Morgan was not reported missing by any members of the church, and it was not until 7 February 2019 that concerned flatmates who had not seen her since Christmas reported her disappearance to police. An extensive police investigation began, led by Bedfordshire Police, Cambridgeshire Constabulary and Hertfordshire Constabulary. Morgan's family took part in local and national media appeals, but no evidence was found to suggest that Morgan was alive. Police found no reliable indications that she wanted to leave the church, suggesting that her number had been removed by someone using her phone.

=== Investigation ===
On the 9 February, police arrested Shohfah-El Israel (born Ajibola Shogbamimu), a UK-based Nigerian man who attended the same church as Morgan, on the M25 motorway. Police searched Israel's car and discovered Morgan's house keys. During questioning, Israel told police that he had driven Morgan to her home in Hatfield on 26 December 2018. Israel was later re-arrested on 26 February 2019 and charged the following day for murder. He later admitted he had in fact spent two nights alone with the University of Hertfordshire student in his Cricklewood flat, but claimed his lies were due to concerns about having broken church rules banning women from being alone with men other than their husbands.

== Trial ==
Israel was put on trial for Morgan's murder at Reading Crown Court in July 2019, entering a plea of "not guilty" before the start of the trial. Evidence given at the trial indicated that Morgan had a good relationship with the church and other congregants, attending worship regularly. Evidence revealed that Morgan had previously referred to Israel as a "father figure", and Israel and his wife would regularly give Morgan lifts between her student accommodation and the church. Evidence also showed that Morgan's mobile phone was detected in Israel's car on 28 December 2018, when prosecutors told the jury that Israel was "most likely looking for somewhere to dispose of the body". Israel had spent time alone with Morgan in December, breaching church rules which banned women from being with men other than their husbands. Despite significant evidence in the case against Israel, he refused to reveal the location of her body.

=== Conviction ===
Israel was convicted of killing Morgan by a jury at Reading Crown Court. Judge Soole expressed his frustration at Israel's "cruel and cowardly" refusal to reveal her whereabouts, despite several pleas from her family, which caused "continuing distress and suffering" to them. The judge sentenced Israel to life imprisonment, with a minimum term of 17 years. On sentencing, Soole stated, "Only you know the circumstances of your terrible deed and why you did it. You are evidently an intelligent man and have said nothing beyond the lies and the explanations which the jury has rejected."

== Reactions and aftermath ==
=== Reactions ===
Speaking outside Reading Crown Court, Morgan's mother, Carol Morgan, said, "Give me my baby back, he knows where she is. The way I hear it he was besotted with her... if he loved her give her back up to us so I can bury my daughter." Detective Inspector Justine Jenkins, expressed relief at the decision the jury had made and her sympathy for Morgan's family, and also urged anyone with information on the whereabouts of Morgan's remains to contact the police.

=== Discovery of human remains ===
In October 2019, Hertfordshire Constabulary confirmed that they had discovered Morgan's remains in woodland near Stevenage. A dog walker found Morgan's remains wrapped in bin bags, bound with gaffer tape and covered with a mound of logs in Norton Green. She was identified through DNA testing. Hertfordshire Constabulary Detective Inspector Justine Jenkins stated that the body of Morgan "wasn't missed" during a previous search of the area by police. Morgan's funeral was held at Lambeth Crematorium in November 2019, with a large number of people, including her family, in attendance.

=== 2021 coroner's inquest ===
A coroner's inquest into the death found inconclusive evidence as to the specific way in which Morgan had died. The case pathologist could not rule out suffocation as a cause of death, potentially following milder blunt-force trauma to the head that may have rendered Morgan unconscious. Samples taken from Morgan's liver and muscles revealed the presence of MDMA although it was impossible to determine the amount Morgan had ingested. The coroner concluded that the nature of her death "strongly suggest her death was caused by the actions of another person".

== See also ==
- List of major crimes in the United Kingdom
- List of murder convictions without a body
