= Murder of Gay Gibson =

British murder case where no body was found

Gay Gibson
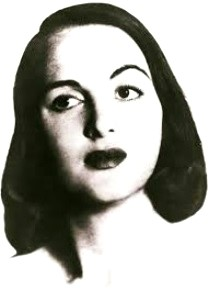
- Gibson c. 1947
- Born: Eileen Isabella Ronnie Gibson; 16 June 1926; Jaipur, British India
- Died: 18 October 1947 (aged 21); Atlantic Ocean (aboard MV Durban Castle)
- Occupation: Actress

Eileen Isabella Ronnie Gibson (16 June 1926 – 18 October 1947), (Note: This means that two days before her death, Gibson was 21 years and five months old. The official court record from 1948 states that at "October last", Gibson was 21 years and four months old.) known professionally as Gay Gibson, was a British actress who went missing during a voyage between Cape Town, South Africa, and Southampton, England, United Kingdom, in October 1947. The criminal case that followed was known as the Porthole Murder, as James Camb, the man who would be convicted of killing Gibson, admitted that he had pushed her body out of the porthole in her cabin aboard the MV Durban Castle into the Atlantic Ocean. Camb claimed that the two had engaged in consensual sex and that she had died of an apparent sudden illness; he had then panicked and thrown her body out of the porthole.

Whilst Camb acknowledged that pushing Gibson's body through the porthole was "a beastly thing to do", he always strenuously denied having killed her, insisting that she had either choked or suffocated whilst the two were in bed together. Camb was convicted of Gibson's murder and sentenced to death by hanging, but a temporary-turned-permanent suspension of the death penalty meant he originally served eleven years in jail before being released on licence. Following further convictions Camb was recalled to jail and served another ten years, being released a year before his death in 1979. He denied murdering Gibson for the rest of his life.

The Gibson case attracted widespread attention at the time, drawing parallels with film noir and Agatha Christie novels. Even British Prime Minister Winston Churchill commented on the outcome of the case, stating his regret that the punishment of Camb had been commuted to a lesser sentence.

== Background ==
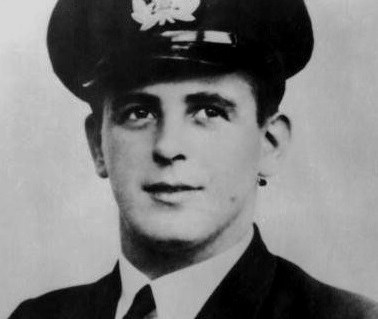
James Camb

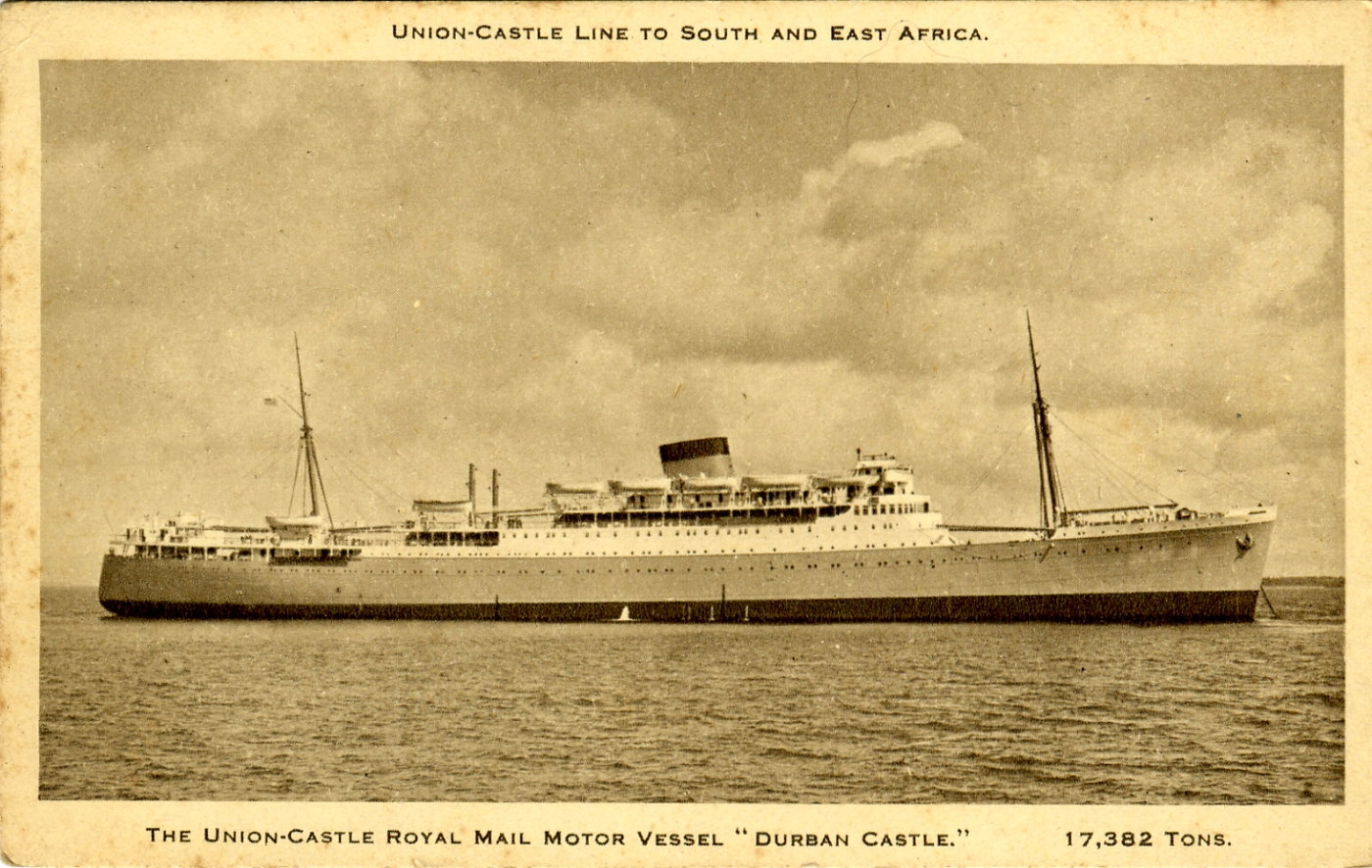
MV Durban Castle

Eileen Isabella Ronnie 'Gay' Gibson was a 21-year-old actress who was travelling back to England on the Union-Castle Line ship MV Durban Castle in October 1947. 'Gay Gibson' was her stage name. She had been on a theatre tour in South Africa with Doreen Mantle and was returning to London to perform in theatre at the West End. Her presence on board came to the attention of James Camb (born 16 December 1916), a 30-year-old (Note: Many sources list Camb as being 31 years old; but this is based upon his age at the time of the trial in March 1948. When Gibson died, he was yet to reach his 31st birthday.) steward on the liner. Gibson had been accommodated in Cabin 126, B Deck, which was in first-class. Camb was seen associating with Gibson, which was against company regulations, and was subsequently reprimanded by a senior officer.

Durban Castle had set sail on 10 October. On the night of 17 October, after spending the evening dancing, Gibson was escorted to her cabin by two friends at 11:30pm. Sometime around 3:00am the following morning, the duty watchman, Frederick Steer, (Note: Some sources state the duty watchman was James Murray, but the official court record states it was Steer who responded to the summons.) was awakened by a summons which had been activated from Gibson's cabin. When he arrived at Cabin 126, Steer noted that two lights were lit outside the cabin, one red and one green; one light indicated that the duty steward had been called, whilst the other meant that the duty stewardess had been requested also. Steer thought this strange as usually only one person would be summoned. Steer's knock at the door was answered by Camb, who only half-opened the door and informed him that everything was alright. Steer left as he assumed that as a deck steward, Camb had arrived before him to help the passenger. (Maxtone-Graham and others dispute this, saying that Steer believed Camb had made good on his boast to sleep with a passenger).

In the morning, the stewardess for Gibson's deck, Eileen Field, came to clean Gibson's cabin. She noticed that the bunk was empty, there were stains on the sheets and the porthole was open. Later, the officer in command of the ship, Captain Patey, interviewed Camb, who initially denied any involvement in Gibson's disappearance. When told that Steer had seen him inside Gibson's cabin, Camb relented and told a story that neither the captain or the ship's doctor could believe: Camb stated that Gibson had suddenly died while the two of them were having sex, and as he stood to lose his job and family, Camb panicked and pushed her body through the porthole.

At the time, Durban Castle was 90 miles (140 km) off the west coast of Africa (specifically what was then Portuguese Guinea, now Guinea-Bissau), heading north. (Note: Some sources state the ship was 150 miles (240 km) off the coast of western Africa.) Patey ordered the ship to turn around and to scour the water for Gibson's body. He also contacted the Union-Castle Line offices in London asking for the ship to be met by police when it arrived in Southampton due to "complications". A return cable was sent to Patey instructing him to "padlock and seal off the room; disturb nothing."

When Durban Castle docked at Cowes Roads, officers from the Southampton City Police were waiting to question Camb, who had been confined to his cabin by the ship's crew. Southampton Police were assisted by the Metropolitan Police on the case and forensic evidence was examined at the Met's laboratory at Hendon. This was not uncommon at the time; Southampton Police was quite small and so often asked for help from Scotland Yard. British police forces were involved as, even though the murder took place off the western coast of Africa, it was a British ship under British authority, so the prosecution was brought by the British authorities. On Monday 27 October 1947, the Southern Daily Echo reported that Camb had been remanded in custody and charged with "murder on the high seas".

== Trial and aftermath ==
Camb's trial in Winchester was an unusual one, since it was labelled by some as the first case in English law whereby a prosecution was sought without a victim's body. This has been pointed out to be untrue, as there was a case thirteen years earlier where a father (Thomas Davidson) was convicted of murdering his son (John), and even further back to the Campden Wonder case in 1660. (Note: The book First and Lasts and Only's; Crime states that Camb was the first British person convicted of a murder without a body.) The case also gained some interest due to it mirroring a plot of a crime novel; Richard Latto described the story as having all the hallmarks of an Agatha Christie piece: "a young actress, a dashing steward, romance and a suspicious death on the high seas."

During the trial, it was revealed that pathologist Denis Hockling had discovered a urine stain on the sheets from Cabin 126. It was stated by the Crown Pathologist that involuntary urination is something that occurs during strangulation. Hockling argued that it could have been a result of natural causes. The contents, walls and porthole section from Cabin 126 were removed by police and used as exhibits in the court case.

When Camb took the stand, the prosecution barrister asked him if he considered himself an honest man. Camb replied, "I think so, sir." It was then proven in court that Camb had changed his story six times in what he defended as self-preservation. When asked about pushing Gibson's body through the porthole, Camb acknowledged that it was "beastly conduct".

After a four-day hearing, the jury deliberated for forty-five minutes and returned with a guilty verdict. Camb was sentenced to death by Justice Hilbery on 22 March 1948. However, the execution was not carried out because Parliament was considering the abolition of the death penalty at the time and the Home Secretary had elected to commute all pending death sentences while the matter was discussed. This prompted former British Prime Minister Winston Churchill to comment that, "The House of Commons has, by its vote, saved the life of the brutal lascivious murderer who thrust the poor girl he had raped and assaulted through a porthole of the ship to the sharks."

Camb lodged an appeal in April 1948 but was denied. He was released from prison in 1959 but was recalled to prison after being convicted of a number of indecent assaults of young girls. He was released again in 1978. Camb died in July 1979 from heart failure. Eileen Gibson's body was never found.

== In popular culture ==
Several books have been written about Gibson's death, and while most have been factual, some have taken the story as a basis for a novel. The Finest Type of English Womanhood by Rachael Heath uses the Porthole Murder as a backstory to her novel, detailing the lives of Gibson and her fictional friend, Laura Trelling. The title of the book is taken from a line spoken by Gibson's mother in court when asked to describe her daughter.

In the August 1948 magazine Startling Detective, there is an article going over the case.

In 1991, the BBC Radio 4 series Murder Most Foul profiled the killing with dramatisations.

A 2011 biography of Sid James, the Carry On film star, forwarded the theory that Gibson was returning to England to find James, as she was his jilted lover. Cliff Goodwin's biography is the only piece written about the comic star that mentions this theory. Other authors have debunked it.

Some people continue to have doubts about Camb's guilt. In 2018, the BBC broadcast a short documentary programme about the killing and asked whether or not Camb was guilty. The thirty-minute programme was first aired on the BBC News Channel in March 2018. In the programme, Doreen Mantle details how she had seen Gibson faint and go blue around the lips. This was also attested to at the trial by the theatre manager Hilary Gilbert. The proposal of Gibson being ill was put to her mother during Camb's trial, but she flatly denied that her daughter was in ill-health. During the Second World War, Gibson enlisted herself in the Auxiliary Territorial Service (ATS) and during July 1946, a junior ATS officer reported being called out to a Private Gibson who was on her bed with her back arched, unable to breathe with her tongue at the back of her throat. Gibson would later state to the ATS officer that she had had one of her "turns".

== See also ==
- List of people who disappeared mysteriously at sea
