= Malcolm Hilbery =

British judge (1883–1965)

The Right Honourable Sir Malcolm Hilbery

Justice of the High Court
- In office 13 February 1935 – 10 January 1962

Personal details
- Education: University College School

Sir George Malcolm Hilbery (14 July 1883 – 18 September 1965) was a British barrister and High Court judge.

The son of a City solicitor, Hilbery was educated at University College School, and was called to the bar by Gray's Inn in 1907. In 1927 he was elected a bencher of his Inn and appointed Recorder of Margate. He took silk in 1928. In 1935, he was appointed to the High Court and assigned to the King's Bench Division, receiving the customary knighthood the same year. In 1959 he was made a privy councillor. He retired in 1962.

One of the most famous cases he presided over was the murder of Gay Gibson. On 30 October 1952, he gave Christopher Craig's older brother, Niven, 12 years' imprisonment for carrying out an armed robbery. Three days later, Christopher Craig shot dead PC Sidney Miles on a Croydon rooftop.

Hilbery wrote Duty and Art in Advocacy, which was first published in 1946. For many years a copy of this little book was presented to every Barrister on their being called to the Bar by The Honourable Society of Gray's Inn.

== Arms ==
Coat of arms of Malcolm Hilbery

Notes
Displayed on a painted panel in the hall at Gray's Inn.
Crest
An escallop reversed Azure charged with a griffin's head erased and langued Argent.
Escutcheon
Argent three escallops Azure on a chief also Azure a balance Proper.
Motto
Nosce Teipsum
