= Peter Rawlinson, Baron Rawlinson of Ewell =

English barrister, politician and author (1919–2006)

The Right Honourable The Lord Rawlinson of Ewell PC QC

Attorney General for Northern Ireland
- In office 30 March 1972 – 4 March 1974
- Prime Minister: Edward Heath
- Preceded by: Basil Kelly (devolved government)
- Succeeded by: Samuel Silkin

Attorney General for England and Wales
- In office 23 June 1970 – 4 March 1974
- Prime Minister: Edward Heath
- Preceded by: Elwyn Jones
- Succeeded by: Samuel Silkin

Shadow Attorney General for England and Wales
- In office 4 March 1974 – 20 March 1974
- Leader: Edward Heath
- Preceded by: Elwyn Jones
- Succeeded by: Michael Havers
- In office April 1968 – 19 June 1970
- Leader: Edward Heath
- Preceded by: John Hobson
- Succeeded by: Elwyn Jones

Shadow Solicitor General
- In office 16 October 1964 – 6 October 1965
- Leader: Alec Douglas-Home; Edward Heath
- Succeeded by: Peter Thomas

Solicitor General for England and Wales
- In office 19 July 1962 – 16 October 1964
- Prime Minister: Harold Macmillan; Alec Douglas-Home
- Preceded by: John Hobson
- Succeeded by: Dingle Foot

Member of Parliament for Epsom and Ewell Epsom (1955–Feb 1974)
- In office 26 May 1955 – 17 April 1978
- Preceded by: Malcolm McCorquodale
- Succeeded by: Archie Hamilton

Member of the House of Lords
- Lord Temporal
- Life peerage 17 April 1978 – 28 June 2006

Personal details
- Born: Peter Anthony Grayson Rawlinson; 26 June 1919 Birkenhead, Cheshire, England
- Died: 28 June 2006 (aged 87) near Avignon, France
- Party: Conservative
- Spouses: Haidee Kavanagh (m. 1940; ann. 1954); Elaine Dominguez (m. 1954)
- Children: 6
- Parent: Arthur Rawlinson (father)
- Education: Royal Military College, Sandhurst

Military service
- Branch/service: British Army
- Years of service: 1939–1946
- Rank: Major
- Unit: Irish Guards
- Battles/wars: World War II

Peter Anthony Grayson Rawlinson, Baron Rawlinson of Ewell, PC, QC (26 June 1919 – 28 June 2006) was an English barrister, Conservative Party politician and author. He served as Member of Parliament for Epsom for 23 years, from 1955 to 1978, and held the offices of Solicitor General (1962–1964) and Attorney General for England and Wales (1970–1974) and for Northern Ireland (1972–1974). Had he been appointed Lord Chancellor, as seemed likely during the mid-1970s, he would have been the first Roman Catholic to hold that position since Thomas More in 1532.

== Early life ==
Peter Anthony Grayson Rawlinson was born in Oxton, within Birkenhead, on 26 June 1919; he grew up in Sussex. He was the son of Lieutenant-Colonel A. R. Rawlinson OBE, a figure in military intelligence and a screenwriter. He was educated by Benedictine monks at Downside, near Bath, Somerset. He read law at Christ's College, Cambridge, where he joined the Cambridge Footlights. He was later elected as an Honorary Fellow of his college in 1981.

However, he only completed one year at the university, moving on to the Royal Military College, Sandhurst, on the outbreak of the Second World War in 1939. He joined the Irish Guards in 1940. In 1943, he was wounded in battle while serving in North Africa and mentioned in dispatches. He was demobilized as a Major in 1946.

== Legal career ==
Rawlinson was called to the bar at Inner Temple in 1946, just before he left the Army. He later became a Bencher in 1962 and was Treasurer in 1984. He joined the chambers of Walter Monckton. During this time, he also served as a libel lawyer for the Sunday Express. The first of his cases that came to public attention was that of Alfred Charles Whiteway, in the Towpath murder case in 1953, in which he was junior counsel, instructed by solicitor Arthur Prothero. He subjected the leading police murder squad detective, Herbert Hannam, to a searching cross-examination over 2 days, which exposed substantial gaps in Hannam's account of a confession by Whiteway. Whiteway was convicted and hanged, but Rawlinson was instructed in other well-known cases.

He was also a junior counsel in the unsuccessful defence of Peter Wildeblood, tried with Edward Montagu and Michael Pitt-Rivers for gross indecency in 1954. A year later in 1955, he was junior counsel for Melford Stevenson in the defence of Ruth Ellis, who was hanged. He also acted in defence of General Anders in a libel case. He took silk in 1959, and joined the chambers of Gerald Gardiner. He was Recorder of Salisbury from 1961 to 1962, and Recorder of Kingston upon Thames from 1975 to 2002. He was Leader of the Western Circuit from 1975 to 1982.

== Political career ==
A member of the Conservative Party, he stood as a Parliamentary candidate for Hackney South in the 1951 general election, losing in a landslide to the Labour incumbent, Herbert Butler. He was elected in the 1955 general election for the safe Conservative seat of Epsom, and held the seat until it was abolished at the February 1974 general election. He was re-elected for the new Epsom and Ewell seat, which he held until his ennoblement in 1978.

He was appointed Solicitor-General by Harold Macmillan in June 1962, following the Night of the Long Knives, receiving the customary knighthood, and served through the prosecution of the spy John Vassall (and subsequent resignation of a junior minister, Tam Galbraith) and the Profumo affair, in which his offer to resign was declined.

He was sworn of the Privy Council in the 1964 New Year Honours, and remained on the front benches in opposition, after the government lost the 1964 general election, but returned to the back benches after unsuccessfully supporting Reginald Maudling as new party leader. From the back benches, he led the opposition to the abolition of the death penalty. He served as Attorney General during the government of Edward Heath, from 1970 to 1974. Unusually, he conducted many prosecutions in person, including that of the Hosein brothers for kidnapping and murdering Muriel McKay (whom they had mistaken for Rupert Murdoch's wife).

He appeared before the House of Lords, arguing that The Times was in contempt of court in publishing details of the cases involving thalidomide, which drew the ire, in particular, of Bernard Levin, who wrote that he appeared to want the law to be administered in private. He also prosecuted IRA members for bombings in London and Aldershot. In 1972, when the Stormont Parliament was suspended, he also became Attorney General for Northern Ireland, and so was called to the bar and became a QC in Northern Ireland that year. He was a target of the Angry Brigade, which attempted to bomb his house several times.

== Retirement ==
He retired from the House of Commons in 1978, and was created a life peer on 17 April 1978 as Baron Rawlinson of Ewell, of Ewell in the County of Surrey. He harboured hopes of being appointed Lord Chancellor or Lord Chief Justice (the law having been changed in 1974 to permit a Roman Catholic to take the former position, widely seen at the time as a measure to permit Rawlinson to take the job) but his politics diverged from those of the new Conservative leader, Margaret Thatcher, and he was never offered either position. In the Lords, he supported restrictions on abortion and divorce. He voted against the introduction of conditional fees in 1990.

After retiring he defended the Daily Mail in a libel action brought by the Unification Church in 1980, and retired from practice at the bar in 1985, but was President of the Senate of Inns of Court and the Bar from 1986 to 1987. He was also an honorary member of the American Bar Association, and an Honorary Fellow of the American College Trial Lawyers. In retirement, he lived in an apartment within New Wardour Castle in Wiltshire.

== Other interests ==
Rawlinson was also an author, having published a book of poetry in 1943, his autobiography in 1989, books on themes inspired by his Catholic faith, and several novels on legal themes; one, Hatred and Contempt, won the Rumpole Award. He also wrote a 1987 documentary series for BBC Radio 3 called The Jesuits.

He was a member of White's and the Marylebone Cricket Club, the vice-president of the Royal Automobile Club, and president of the Friends of London Oratory from 1980 to 1995. He was also a director of Daily Telegraph plc. He enjoyed landscape painting and the theatre.

== Personal life and death ==
In 1940, Rawlinson married Haidee Kavanagh; they had three children, and their marriage was annulled in 1954. Later that year, he married Elaine Dominguez, an American citizen from Newport, Rhode Island; they had three children. His second wife was his first cousin, their mothers being daughters of Sir Henry Grayson.

Rawlinson died on 28 June 2006, at the age of 87, near Avignon, France, where he was on holiday.

== Arms ==
Coat of arms of Peter Rawlinson, Baron Rawlinson of Ewell

Crest
On a mount Vert within a circlet of acorns and harps Or a duck Proper holding in the beak an escallop Argent.
Escutcheon
Or between three towers Sable each charged with a sword point upwards Argent a pall reversed Sable thereon in chief a lymphad Argent and in chevron a lion head erased Or between two roses Argent barbed and seeded Proper.
Supporters
Dexter a Pegasus Sable maned hooved and crowned Gold, sinister a llama Or gorged with a ribbon Blue Celeste and Argent the ends flottant upwards.
Motto
Mon Dieu Et Mon Roi

== Publications ==
Sources:

- War Poems and Poetry 1943
- Public Duty and Personal Faith - the example of Thomas More 1978
- A Price Too High (autobiography) 1989
- The Jesuit Factor 1990
- The Colombia Syndicate (novel) 1991
- Hatred and Contempt (novel) 1992
- His Brother's Keeper (novel) 1993
- Indictment for Murder (novel) 1994
- The Caverel Claim (novel) 1998
- The Richmond Diary (novel) 2001
- A Relic of War (novel) 2004

Parliament of the United Kingdom
Preceded by Malcolm McCorquodale	Member of Parliament for Epsom; 1955 – Feb 1974	Constituency abolished see Epsom and Ewell
New constituency	Member of Parliament for Epsom and Ewell; Feb 1974 – 1978	Succeeded by Archie Hamilton
Legal offices
Preceded by John Hobson	Solicitor General for England and Wales; 1962–1964	Succeeded by Dingle Foot
Preceded by Elwyn Jones	Attorney General for England and Wales; 1970–1974	Succeeded by Samuel Silkin
Preceded by Basil Kelly	Attorney General for Northern Ireland; 1972–1974	Succeeded by Samuel Silkin
